= WSRP =

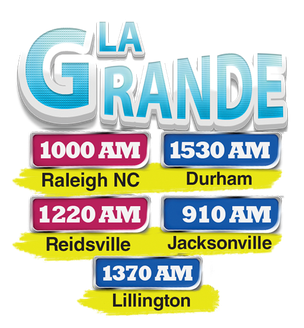
- Jacksonville, North Carolina; United States
- Frequency: 910 kHz
- Branding: La Grande 910

Programming
- Format: Regional Mexican
- Affiliations: Charlotte FC

Ownership
- Owner: Estuardo Valdemar Rodriguez & Leonor Rodriguez
- Sister stations: WLLN, WLLQ, WREV, WRTG

History
- First air date: 1992
- Former call signs: WLAS (1992–1998); WSTK (1998–2004)

Technical information
- Licensing authority: FCC
- Facility ID: 18529
- Class: B
- Power: 5,000 watts
- Transmitter coordinates: 34°47′45″N 77°29′24″W
- Translator: 95.9 W240DX (Jacksonville)

Links
- Public license information: Public file; LMS
- Webcast: Listen live
- Website: lagrandenc.com

WSRP (910 AM) is a radio station broadcasting a Regional Mexican format. Licensed to Jacksonville, North Carolina, United States. The station is currently owned by Estuardo Valdemar Rodriguez & Leonor Rodriguez.

== History ==
WLAS stands for World's Largest Amphibious Station in recognition of the Marine Base at Camp LeJeune located next to Jacksonville, North Carolina.

From the early 1950s to 1992, the Popkin family owned the radio station. In 1970, WLAS become the first radio station in Jacksonville to play continuous country music. For over 20 years, WLAS was a heritage Country radio station. The local large FM stations continued to erode the audience until the station went dark in 1990.

In 1992 Eckhardt Broadcasting Corporation purchased the dark station. The general manager/owner was Fayetteville native Keith Eckhardt. In June 1992, WLAS returned to the airways as "Hot Talk 910". The station included local retired Marine Gunny Sgt Gene Buckner, national talk show host Charles Alder. In 1994, the station became known at The BIG 910 after the local area code was changed to 910. The station was one of the first national affiliates of the Ron & Ron Show, G. Gordon Liddy, and the Don & Mike show. In 1996, Eckhardt Broadcasting Corporation sold WLAS to Conner Media Corporation.
