= Research Triangle =

Geographic region of North Carolina, U.S.

Coordinates: 35.89°N 78.86°W

- Combined Statistical Area
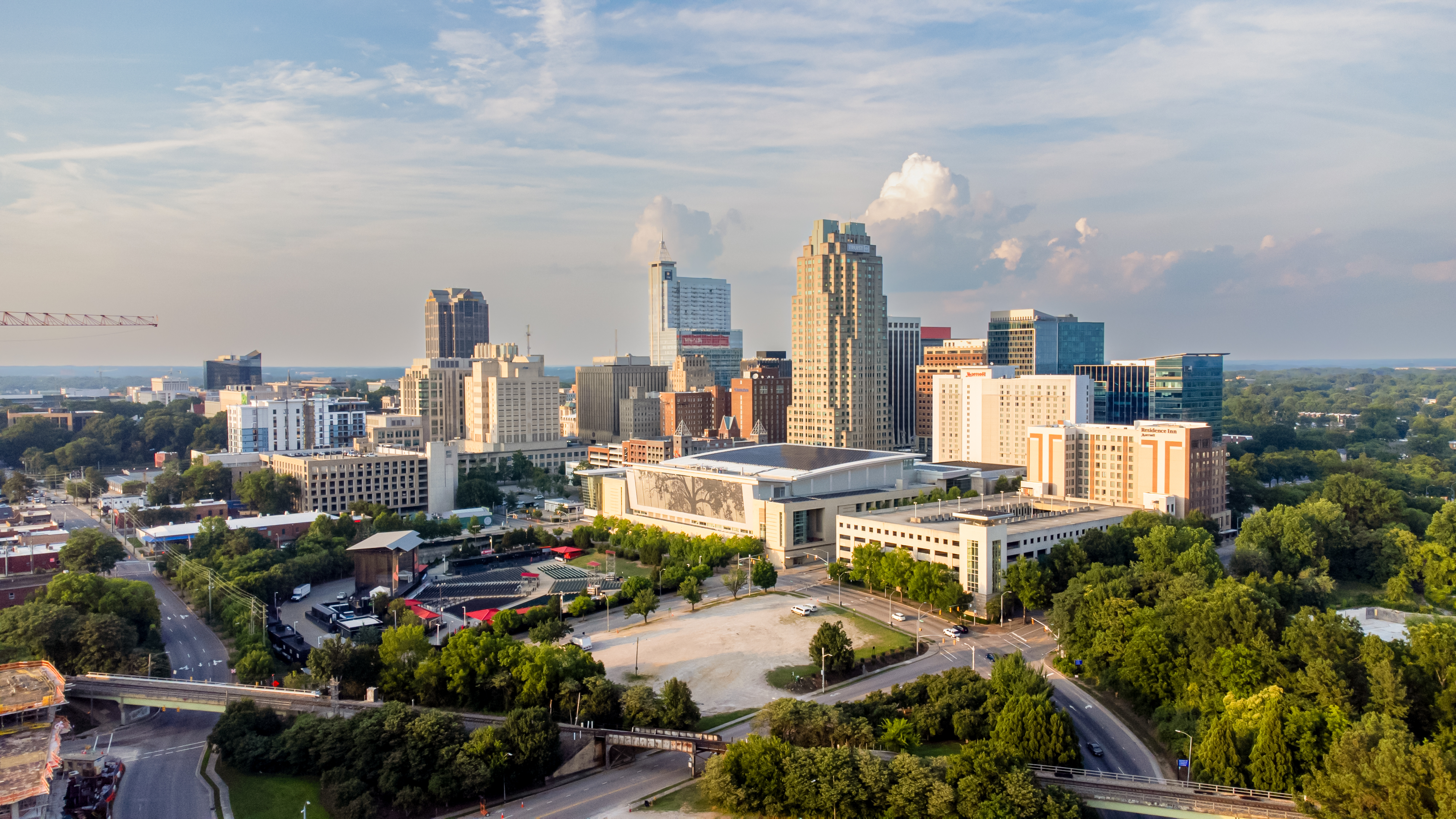
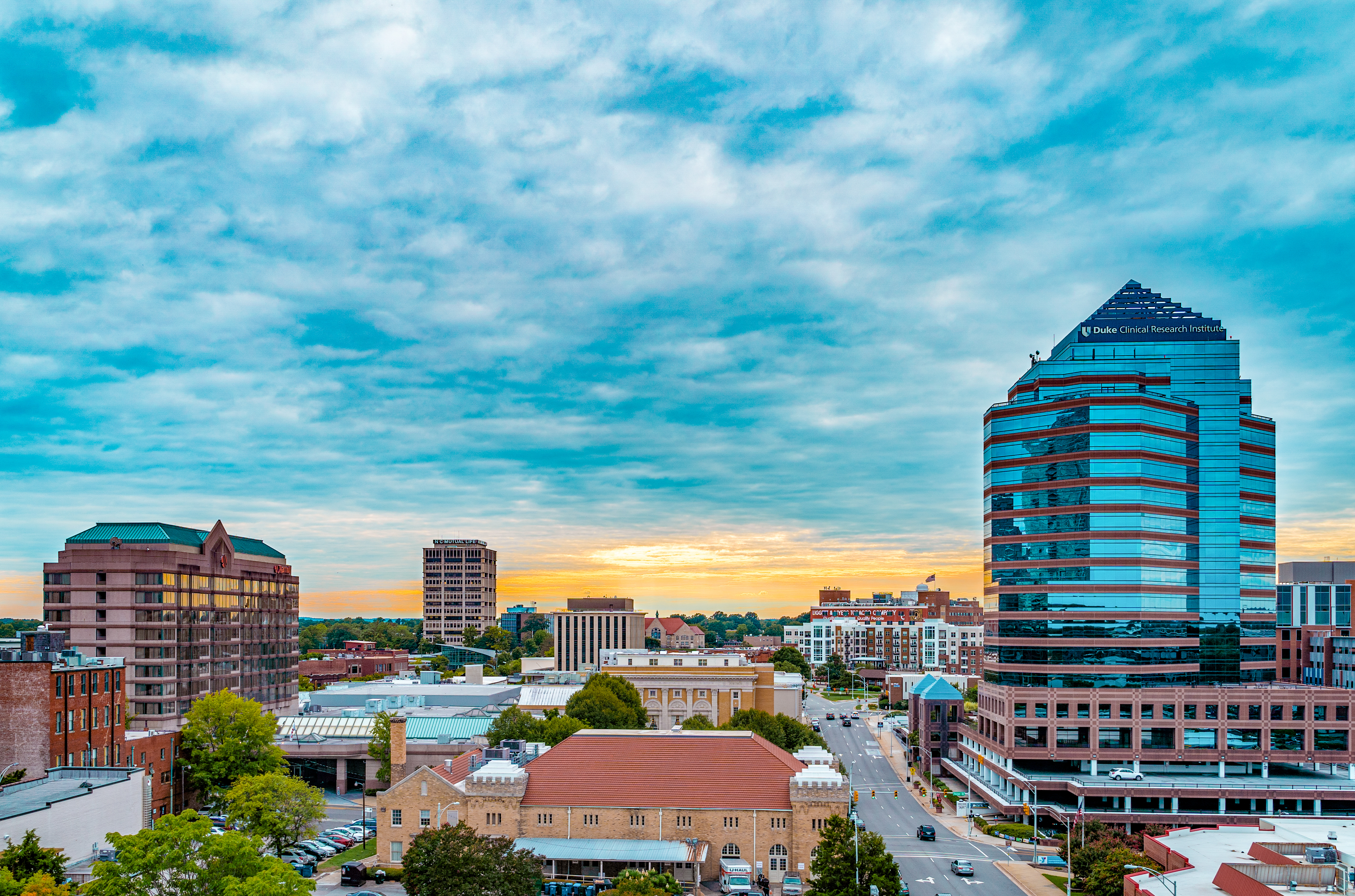
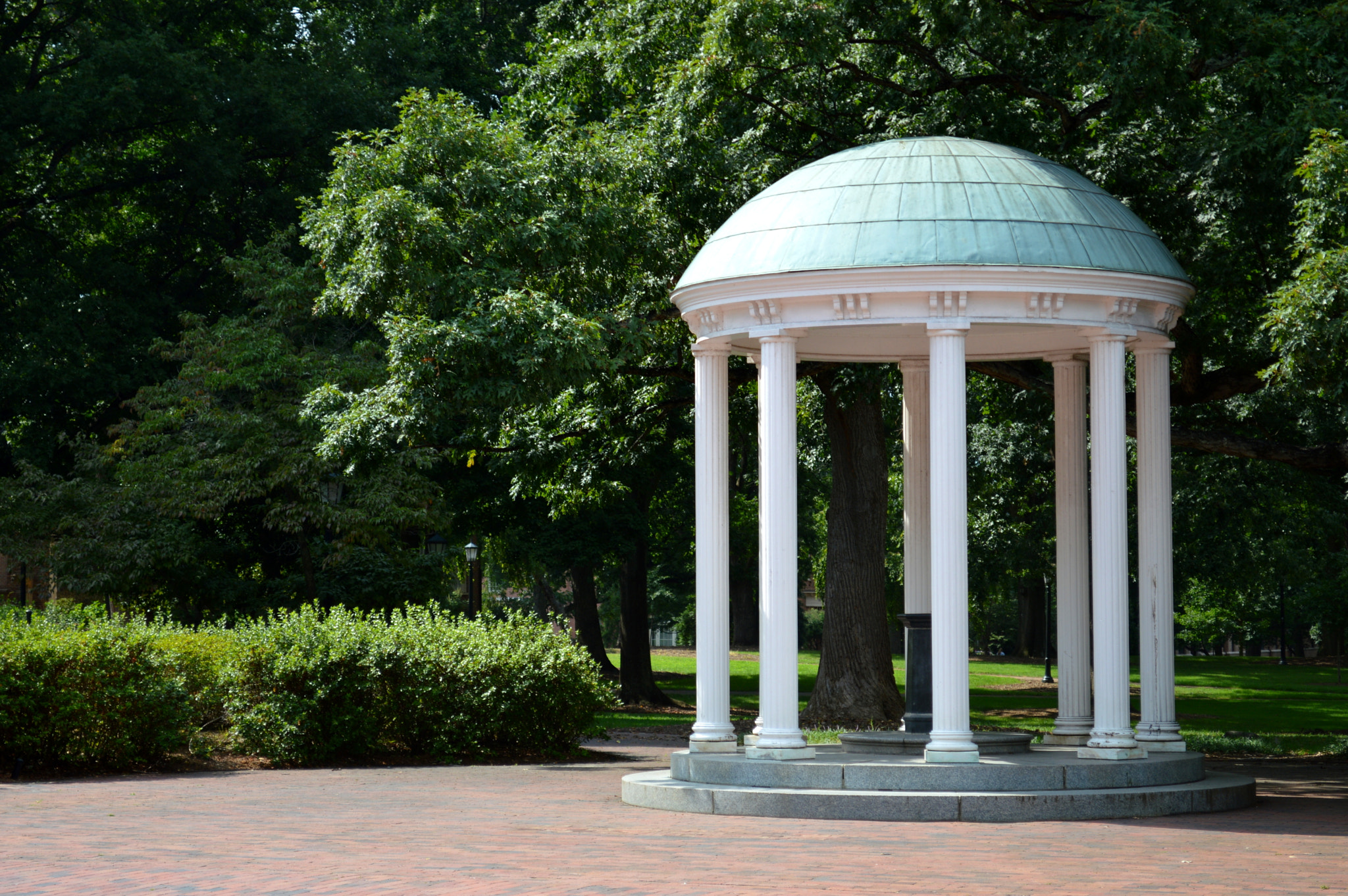
- Representations of the Research Triangle (from top to bottom): skyline of Raleigh, skyline of Durham, and the Old Well in Chapel Hill
Map of Raleigh–Durham–Cary, NC CSA
Raleigh–Cary MSA
Durham–Chapel Hill MSA
Anderson Creek µSA
Sanford µSA
Henderson µSA
City of Raleigh
City of Durham
Town of Chapel Hill
- Country: United States
- State: North Carolina
- Largest city: Raleigh
- Other cities: Durham; Chapel Hill; Cary

Area
  - Total: 4,766 sq mi (12,340 km^{2})

Population (2020)
  - Density: 442/sq mi (171/km^{2})
  - CSA: 2,106,463 (32nd)

GDP
  - Raleigh–Durham–Cary (CSA): $183.624 billion (2022)
  - Raleigh (MSA): $119.675 billion (2022)
  - Durham-Chapel Hill (MSA): $63.950 billion (2022)
- Time zone: UTC−5 (EST)
  - Summer (DST): UTC−4 (EDT)
- Area codes: 919, 984

The Research Triangle, or simply The Triangle, are both common nicknames for a Combined Statistical Area in the Piedmont region of the U.S. state of North Carolina. Anchored by the cities of Raleigh and Durham and the town of Chapel Hill, the region is home to three major research universities: North Carolina State University, Duke University, and the University of North Carolina at Chapel Hill, respectively. The "Triangle" name originated in the 1950s with the creation of Research Triangle Park located between the three anchor cities, which is the largest research park in the United States and home to several high tech companies.

Both Raleigh and Durham have their own separate Metropolitan statistical areas (MSA). However, the eleven-county region, officially named the Raleigh–Durham–Cary, NC Combined Statistical Area by the Office of Management and Budget, comprises the Raleigh–Cary, Durham–Chapel Hill, Henderson, Anderson Creek, and Sanford, NC statistical areas. The 2020 census put the combined statistical area (CSA) population at 2,242,324, making it the second-largest combined statistical area in North Carolina, behind the Charlotte area. The Raleigh–Durham television market includes a broader 24-county area which includes Fayetteville, North Carolina, and has a population of 2,726,000 persons. Most of the Triangle is part of North Carolina's first, second, fourth, ninth, and thirteenth congressional districts.

The region is sometimes confused with the Piedmont Triad, which is a North Carolina region adjacent to and directly west of the Triangle comprising Greensboro, Winston-Salem, and High Point, among other cities. Both the Research Triangle and the Piedmont Triad form part of the Piedmont Crescent, an urbanized region of the state that includes the city of Charlotte.

== Definitions ==
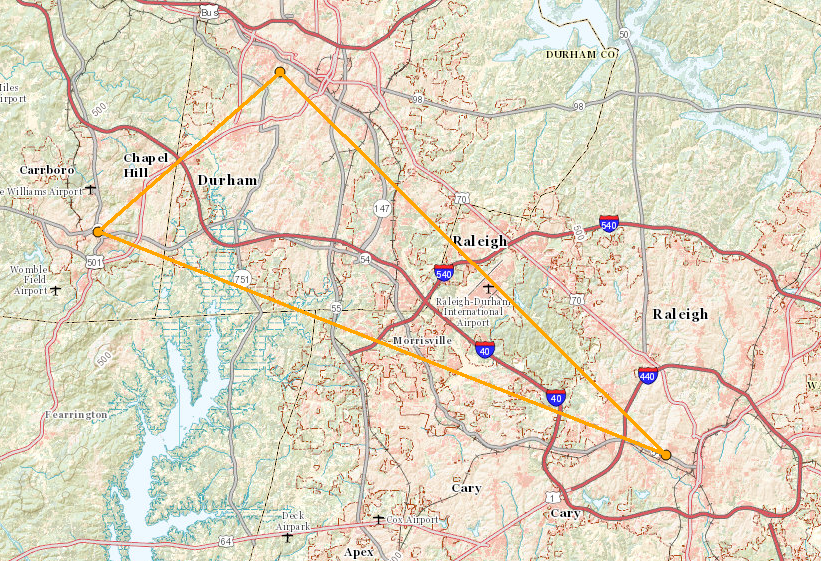
A map of Research Triangle in North Carolina, highlighting the locations of North Carolina State University, Duke University, and University of North Carolina at Chapel Hill

The Research Triangle encompasses between 3 to 16 counties depending on the definition used. The three core counties of Wake, Durham, and Orange are home to research universities.

=== Combined Statistical Area ===
As of July 21, 2023, the US Office of Management and Budget (OMB) delineated the Raleigh–Durham–Cary Combined Statistical Area as consisting of two metropolitan and three micropolitan statistical areas. Those five statistical areas in turn are defined as consisting of a total of ten counties. The statistical areas and their constituent counties are outlined in the following tables:

Statistical Areas

Statistical Area	2025 estimate	2020 Census	Change	Area	Density
Raleigh–Cary, NC Metropolitan Statistical Area	1,595,720	1,413,982	+12.85%	2,147 sq mi (5,560 km^{2})	743/sq mi (287/km^{2})
Durham–Chapel Hill, NC Metropolitan Statistical Area	625,485	588,911	+6.21%	1,812 sq mi (4,690 km^{2})	345/sq mi (133/km^{2})
Anderson Creek, NC Micropolitan Statistical Area	150,137	133,568	+12.40%	601 sq mi (1,560 km^{2})	250/sq mi (96/km^{2})
Sanford, NC Micropolitan Statistical Area	70,258	63,285	+11.02%	259 sq mi (670 km^{2})	271/sq mi (105/km^{2})
Henderson, NC Micropolitan Statistical Area	42,638	42,578	+0.14%	269 sq mi (700 km^{2})	159/sq mi (61/km^{2})
Total	2,484,238	2,242,324	+10.79%	5,088 sq mi (13,180 km^{2})	488/sq mi (189/km^{2})

Counties

County	Seat	Statistical Area	2025 estimate	2020 Census	Change	Area	Density
Wake	Raleigh	Raleigh–Cary	1,257,235	1,129,410	+11.32%	857 sq mi (2,220 km^{2})	1,467/sq mi (566/km^{2})
Durham	Durham	Durham–Chapel Hill	347,240	324,833	+6.90%	298 sq mi (770 km^{2})	1,165/sq mi (450/km^{2})
Johnston	Smithfield	Raleigh–Cary	256,448	215,999	+18.73%	796 sq mi (2,060 km^{2})	322/sq mi (124/km^{2})
Orange	Hillsborough	Durham–Chapel Hill	152,498	148,696	+2.56%	401 sq mi (1,040 km^{2})	380/sq mi (147/km^{2})
Harnett	Lillington	Anderson Creek	150,137	133,568	+12.40%	601 sq mi (1,560 km^{2})	250/sq mi (96/km^{2})
Chatham	Pittsboro	Durham–Chapel Hill	85,111	76,285	+11.57%	709 sq mi (1,840 km^{2})	120/sq mi (46/km^{2})
Franklin	Louisburg	Raleigh–Cary	82,037	68,573	+19.63%	495 sq mi (1,280 km^{2})	166/sq mi (64/km^{2})
Lee	Sanford	Sanford	70,258	63,285	+11.02%	259 sq mi (670 km^{2})	271/sq mi (105/km^{2})
Vance	Henderson	Henderson	42,638	42,578	+0.14%	269 sq mi (700 km^{2})	159/sq mi (61/km^{2})
Person	Roxboro	Durham–Chapel Hill	40,636	39,097	+3.94%	404 sq mi (1,050 km^{2})	101/sq mi (39/km^{2})
Total			2,484,238	2,242,324	+10.79%	5,088 sq mi (13,180 km^{2})	488/sq mi (189/km^{2})

Prior to September 2018, the OMB used the name Raleigh–Durham–Chapel Hill, NC Combined Statistical Area, and several additional counties were included. The Dunn µSA (Harnett County) and Sanford µSA (Lee County) were moved to the Fayetteville–Sanford–Lumberton Combined Statistical Area, while the Oxford µSA (Granville County) was folded into the Durham–Chapel Hill Metropolitan Statistical Area. The Raleigh Metropolitan Statistical Area was also renamed the Raleigh–Cary Metropolitan Statistical Area.

Historical population
Census	Pop.	Note	%±
1950	483,418		—
1960	534,029		10.5%
1970	628,319		17.7%
1980	765,191		21.8%
1990	962,962		25.8%
2000	1,315,016		36.6%
2010	1,740,185		32.3%
2020	2,106,463		21.0%
2020

=== Regional partnerships ===
The members of the Research Triangle Regional Partnership are:

- Chatham
- Durham
- Franklin
- Granville
- Harnett
- Johnston
- Lee
- Nash
- Orange
- Person
- Wake
- Warren
- Wilson

All counties in North Carolina are in one of 16 regional councils which provide programs and services to local governments. The Triangle J Council of Governments includes Chatham, Durham, Johnston, Lee, Moore, Orange, and Wake Counties. The northern Triangle counties of Person, Granville, Franklin, Vance, and Warren are part of the Kerr-Tar Regional Council of Governments.

== Cities ==
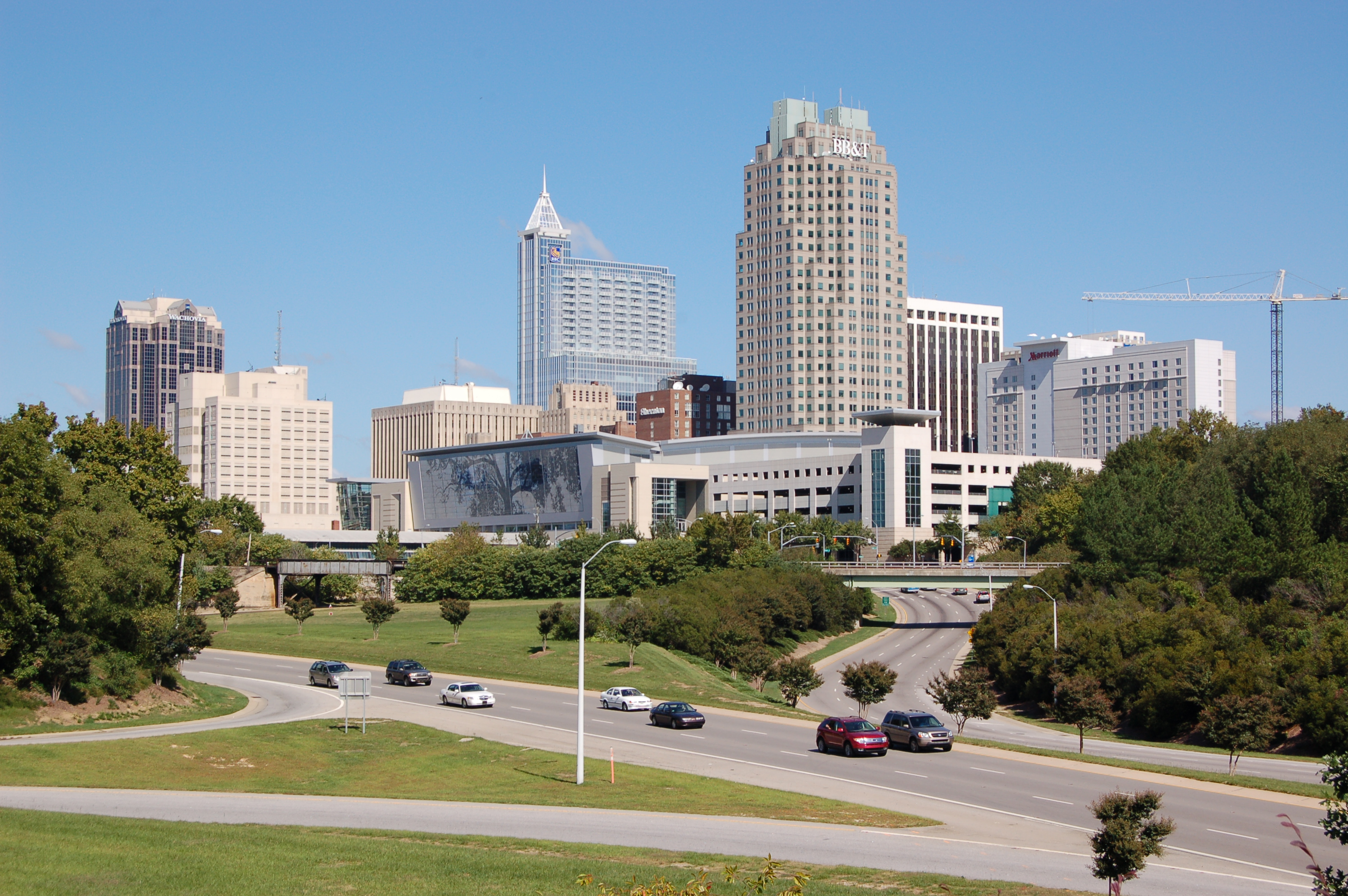
Raleigh is the capital of North Carolina and the largest city in the Research Triangle area.

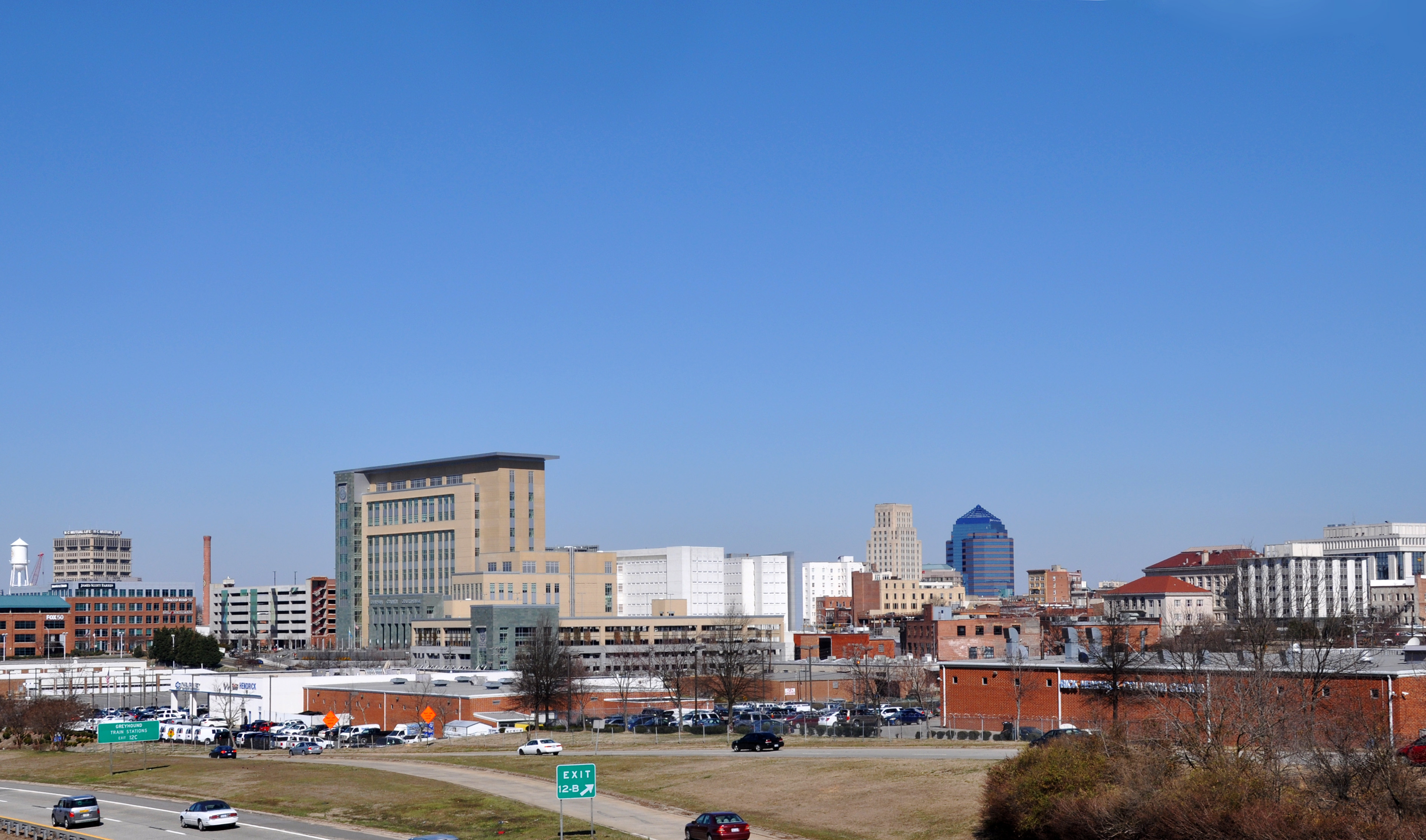
Downtown Durham, the second-largest city in the area

The Triangle region, as defined for statistical purposes as the Raleigh–Durham–Cary CSA, comprises nine counties, although the U.S. Census Bureau divided the region into two metropolitan statistical areas and one micropolitan area in 2003. The Raleigh-Cary metropolitan area comprises Wake, Franklin, and Johnston Counties; the Durham-Chapel Hill metropolitan area comprises Durham, Orange, Chatham, Granville, and Person Counties; and the Henderson micropolitan area comprises Vance County.

Some area television stations define the region as Raleigh–Durham–Fayetteville. Fayetteville is more than 50 miles (80 km) from Raleigh, but is part of the Triangle television market.

Rank	City / town	County	2020 Census	2010 Census	Change
1	Raleigh	Wake County / Durham County	467,665	403,892	+15.79%
2	Durham	Durham County / Wake County	283,506	228,330	+24.17%
3	Cary	Wake County / Chatham County	174,721	135,234	+29.20%
4	Chapel Hill	Orange County / Durham County / Chatham County	61,960	57,233	+8.26%
5	Apex	Wake County	58,780	37,476	+56.85%
6	Wake Forest	Wake County / Franklin County	47,601	30,117	+58.05%
7	Holly Springs	Wake County	41,239	24,661	+67.22%
8	Fuquay-Varina	Wake County	34,152	17,937	+90.40%
9	Garner	Wake County	31,159	25,745	+21.03%
10	Morrisville	Wake County / Durham County	29,630	18,576	+59.51%
11	Clayton	Johnston County / Wake County	26,307	16,116	+63.24%
12	Carrboro	Orange County	21,295	19,582	+8.75%
13	Knightdale	Wake County	19,632	11,401	+72.20%
14	Mebane	Alamance County / Orange County	17,797	11,393	+56.21%
15	Henderson	Vance County	15,060	15,368	−2.00%

== Education ==
Public secondary education in the Triangle is similar to that of the majority of the state of North Carolina, in which there are county-wide school systems (the exception is Chapel Hill-Carrboro City Schools within Orange County but apart from Orange County Schools). Based in Cary, the Wake County Public School System, which includes the cities of Raleigh and Cary, is the largest school system in the state of North Carolina and the 15th-largest in the United States, with average daily enrollment of 159,949 as of the second month of the 2016–17 school year. Other larger systems in the region include Durham Public Schools (about 33,000 students) and rapidly growing Johnston County Schools (about 31,000 students).

=== Institutions of higher education ===
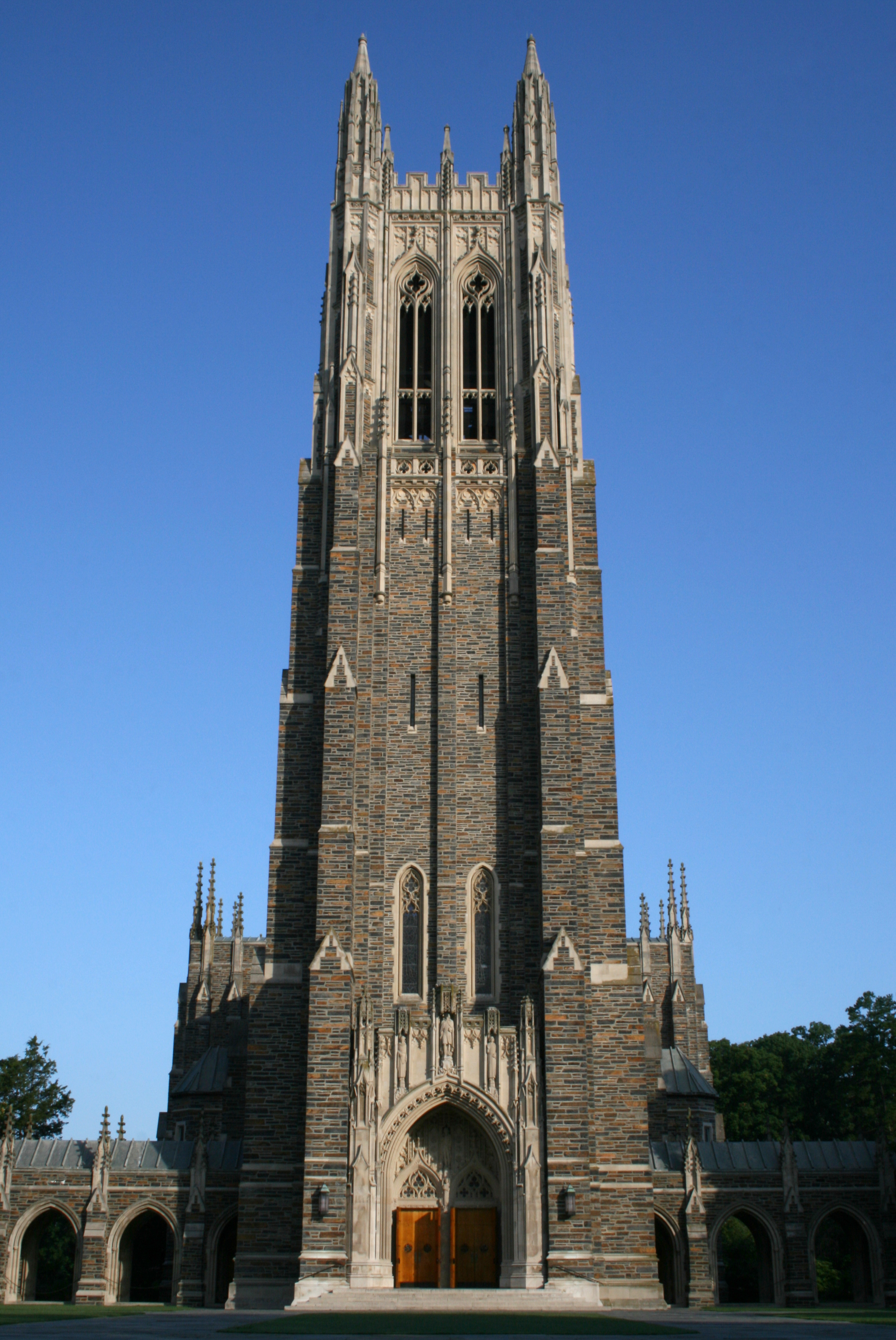
Duke Chapel at Duke University

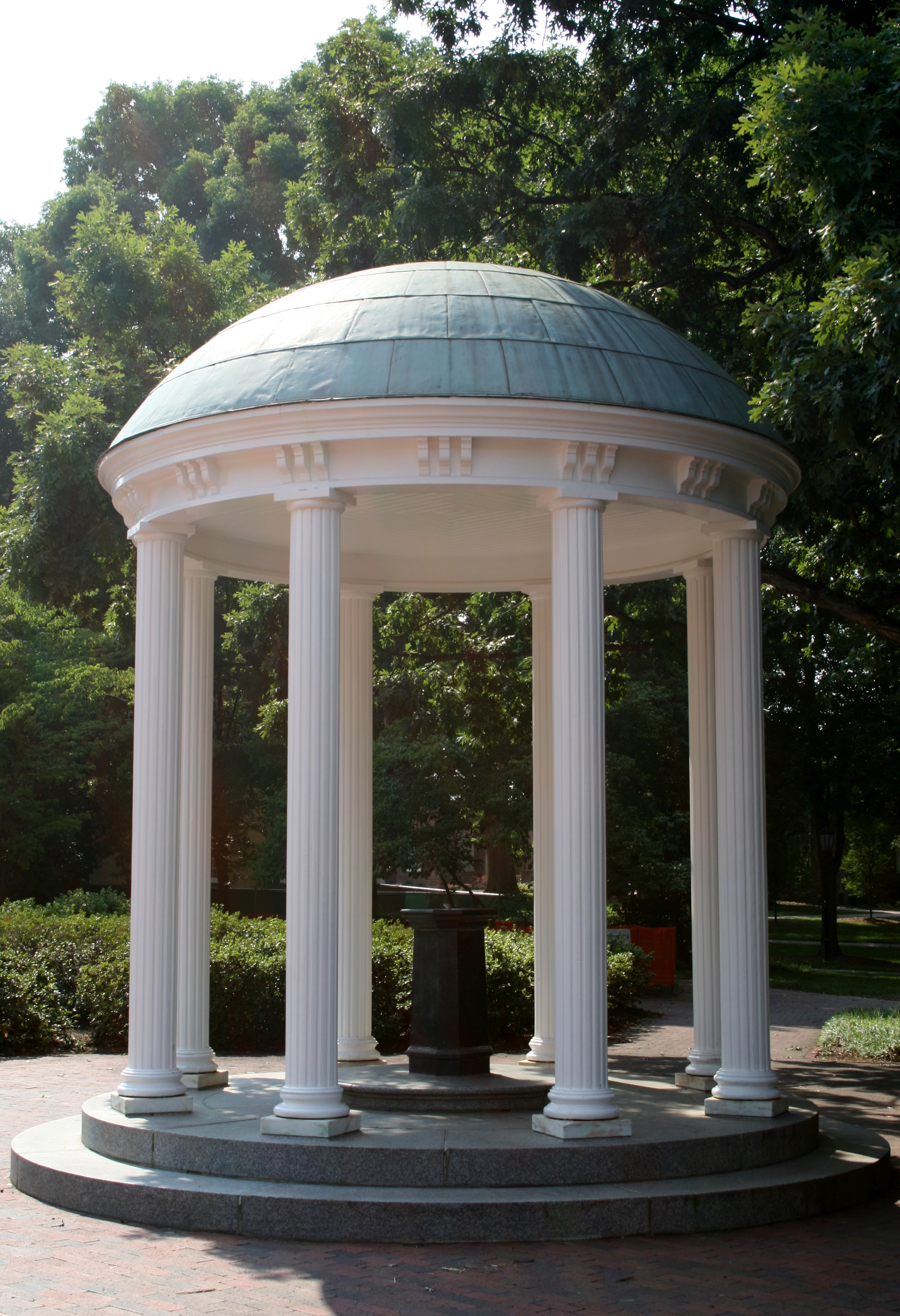
Old Well at the University of North Carolina at Chapel Hill

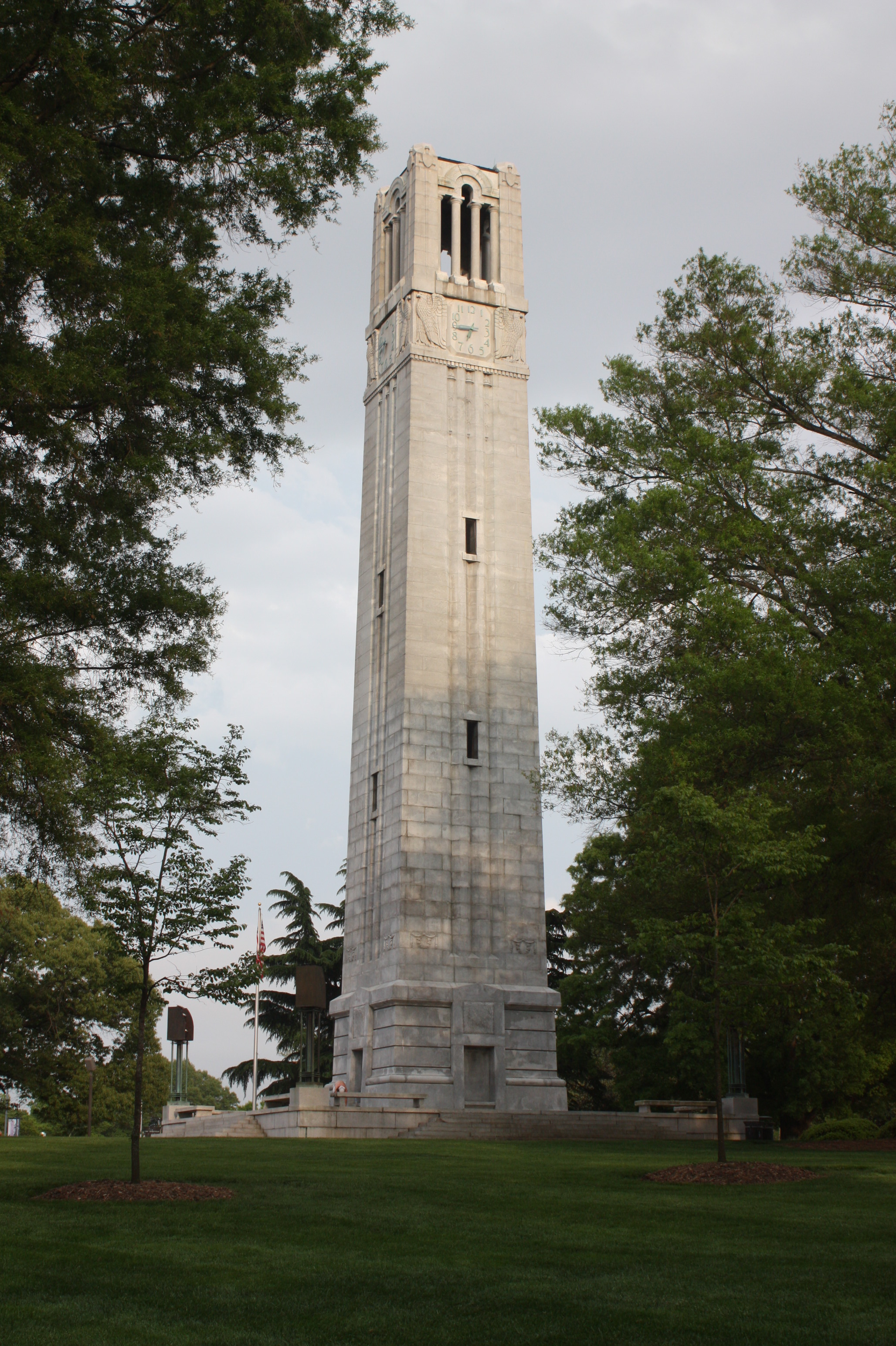
North Carolina State University Memorial Belltower

- Campbell University
- Central Carolina Community College
- Duke University
- Durham Technical Community College
- ECPI University, Raleigh campus
- Louisburg College
- Meredith College
- Montreat College's School of Professional and Adult Studies
- North Carolina Central University
- North Carolina State University
- Piedmont Community College
- Shaw University
- Skema Business School, Raleigh campus
- Southeastern Baptist Theological Seminary and The College at Southeastern
- St. Augustine's College
- Strayer University, Raleigh campus
- University of North Carolina at Chapel Hill
- Vance-Granville Community College
- Wake Technical Community College
- William Peace University

== Sports ==
=== College sports ===
With the significant number of universities and colleges in the area and the relative absence of major league professional sports, NCAA sports are very popular, particularly those sports in which the Atlantic Coast Conference participates, most notably basketball.

The Duke Blue Devils (representing Duke University in Durham), NC State Wolfpack (representing North Carolina State University in Raleigh), and North Carolina Tar Heels (representing the University of North Carolina at Chapel Hill) are all members of the ACC. Rivalries among these schools are very strong, fueled by proximity to each other, with annual competitions in every sport. Adding to the rivalries is the large number of graduates the high schools in the region send to each of the local universities. It is very common for students at one university to know many students attending the other local universities, which increases the opportunities for "bragging" among the schools. The four ACC schools in the state, Duke, North Carolina, North Carolina State, and Wake Forest University (the last of which was originally located in the town of Wake Forest before moving to Winston-Salem in 1956), are referred to as Tobacco Road by sportscasters, particularly in basketball. All four teams consistently produce high-caliber teams. Each of the Triangle-based universities listed has won at least two NCAA Basketball national championships.

Three historically black colleges, including recent Division I arrival North Carolina Central University and Division II members Saint Augustine's University and Shaw University also boost the popularity of college sports in the region.

Other colleges in the Triangle that field intercollegiate teams include Campbell University, Meredith College, and William Peace University.

The Triangle will host the World University Summer Games in 2029.

=== Professional sports ===
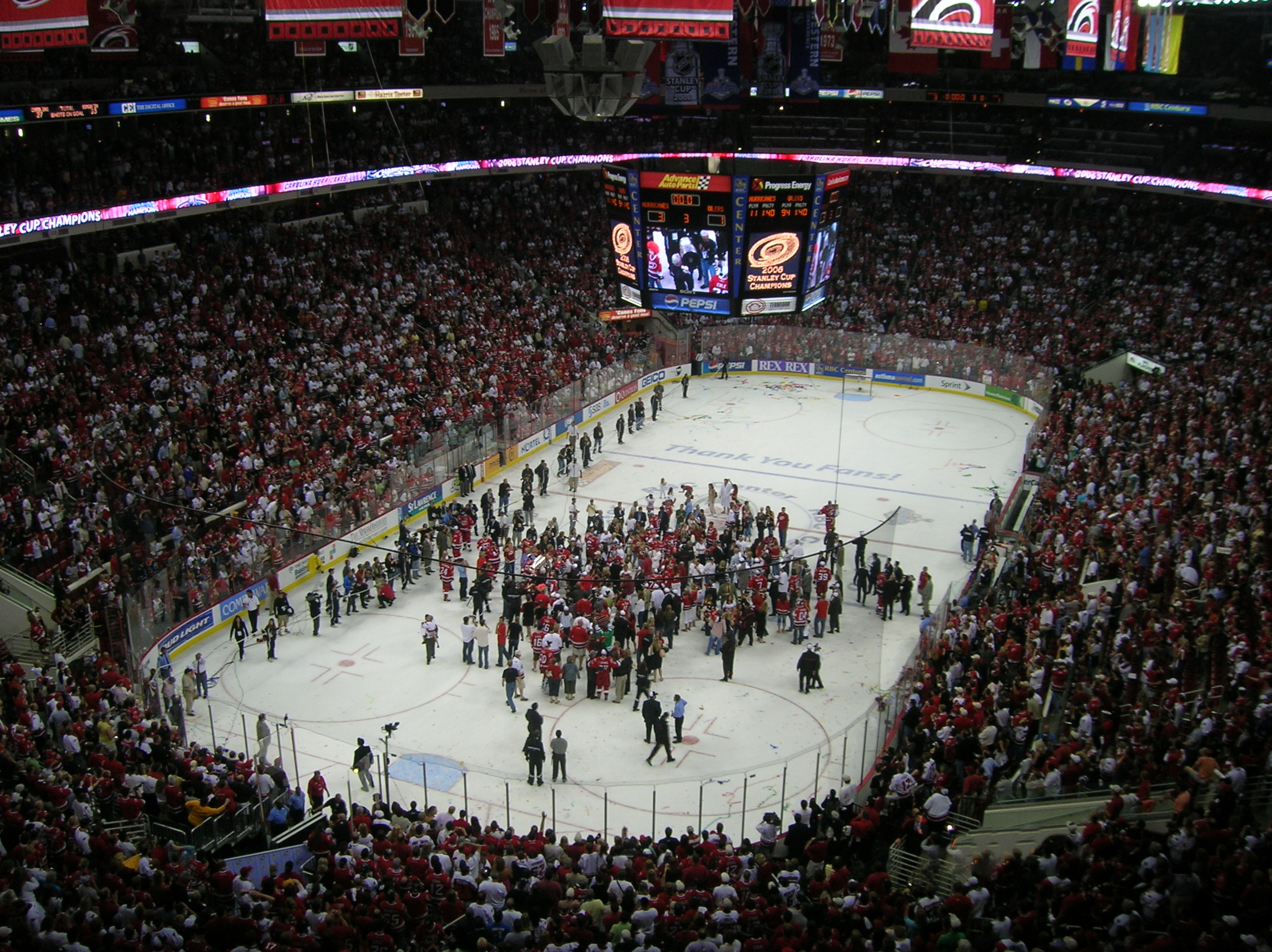
2006 Stanley Cup Finals ceremony at the RBC Center (now Lenovo Center)

The region has only one professional team of the four major sports, the Carolina Hurricanes of the National Hockey League, based in Raleigh. Since moving to the Research Triangle region from Hartford, Connecticut, they have enjoyed great success, including winning two Stanley Cup championships, most recently in June 2026.

Cary is home to the North Carolina Courage, who compete in the National Women's Soccer League. They relocated to the Triangle from western New York in 2017 and experienced immediate success, winning the NWSL Shield in their first three years. They play in WakeMed Soccer Park, which has also hosted The Soccer Tournament since 2023. The complex was previously home to North Carolina FC, who competed in the USL Championship; they are currently dormant pending an application to join the USL Premier in 2028.

With limited top-level professional sports options, minor league sports are quite popular in the region. The region is home to two Minor League Baseball teams: the Durham Bulls and the Wilson Warbirds. The Bulls are the Triple-A affiliate of the Tampa Bay Rays, while the Warbirds are the Single-A affiliate of the Milwaukee Brewers. They previously played in Zebulon as the Carolina Mudcats for many years before relocating to Wilson in 2026.

Durham is also home to the Carolina Blaze of the Athletes Unlimited Softball League.

Team	League	Sport	Venue (capacity)
Carolina Hurricanes	NHL	Hockey	Lenovo Center (18,680)
Durham Bulls	IL (AAA)	Baseball	DBAP (10,000)
North Carolina Courage	NWSL (D1)	Soccer	WakeMed Soccer Park (10,000)
Carolina Blaze	AUSL	Softball	Smith Family Stadium (900)
Carolina Flyers	AUDL	Ultimate	WakeMed Soccer Park (10,000) / Cardinal Gibbons High School

The area also had a team in the fledgling World League of American Football – however, the Raleigh–Durham Skyhawks, coached by Roman Gabriel, did not exactly cover themselves in glory; they lost all 10 games of their inaugural (and only) season in 1991. The team folded after that, being replaced in the league by the Ohio Glory, which fared little better at 1–9, ultimately suffering the same fate – along with the other six teams based in North America – when the league took a two-year hiatus, returning as a six-team all-European league in 1995. The Orange County Speedway in Rougemont hosts stock car racing events including the Pro All Stars Series, the CARS Super Late Model Tour and the CARS Late Model Stock Tour.

== Economy ==
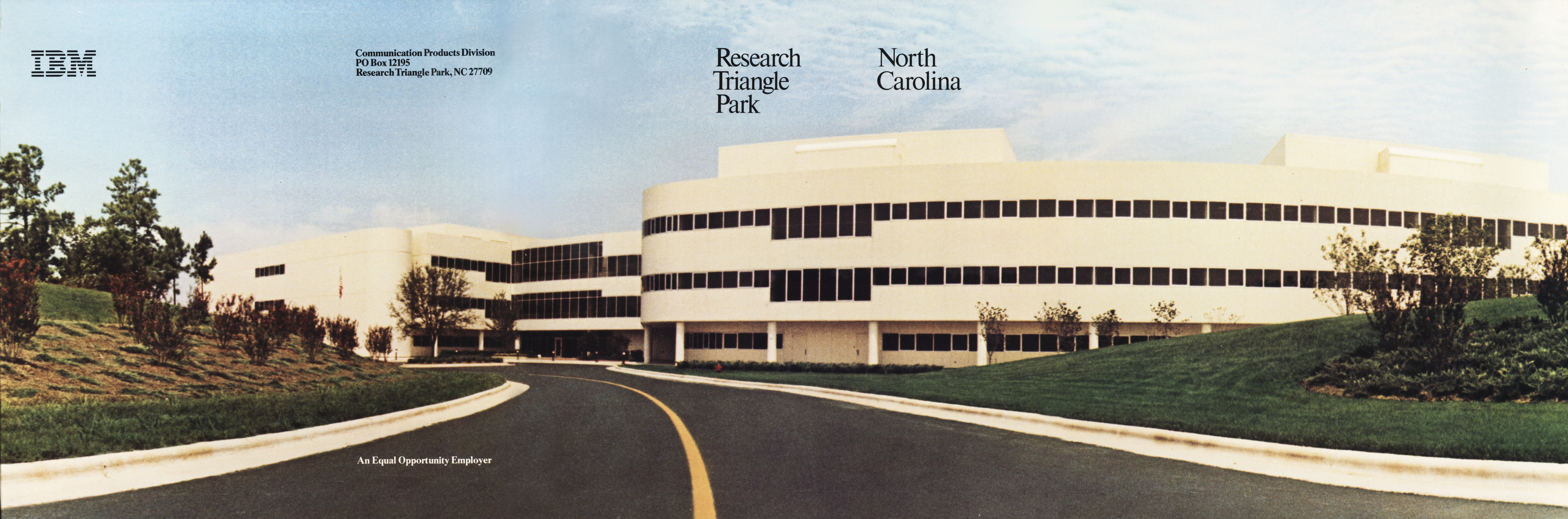
IBM Research Triangle Park facility, pictured around 1982

The region's growing high-technology community includes such companies as IBM, Lenovo, SAS Institute, Cisco Systems, NetApp, Red Hat, Dell Technologies, and Credit Suisse First Boston. In addition to high-tech, the region is consistently ranked in the top three in the U.S. with concentration in life science companies. Some of these companies include GlaxoSmithKline, Biogen Idec, BASF, Merck & Co., Novo, Novozymes, and Pfizer. Research Triangle Park and North Carolina State University's Centennial Campus in Raleigh support innovation through R&D and technology transfer among the region's companies and research universities (including Duke University and the University of North Carolina at Chapel Hill).

The area fared relatively well during the late-2000s recession, ranked as the strongest region in North Carolina by the Brookings Institution and among the top 40 in the country. The change in unemployment during 2008 to 2009 was 4.6% and home prices was 2%. The Greensboro metropolitan area was listed among the second-weakest and the Charlotte area among the middle in the country.

=== Major employers ===
- ABB
- Ajinomoto
- American Airlines
- American Association of Textile Chemists and Colorists
- Army Research Laboratory
- BASF
- Bank of America
- Bayer
- Blue Cross Blue Shield of North Carolina
- Biogen
- bioMérieux
- Burt's Bees
- Caterpillar Inc.
- Cisco
- UBS
- Cengage
- Dell Technologies
- Delta Electronics
- Deutsche Bank
- Duke Energy
- Duke University
- Durham Public Schools
- DuPont
- Eaton
- Fidelity Investments
- Fujifilm
- Environmental Protection Agency
- General Electric
- GKN
- GlaxoSmithKline
- Google
- Grifols
- IBM
- Intel
- IQVIA
- John Deere
- LabCorp
- Lenovo
- MetLife
- National Institute of Environmental Health Sciences, part of the National Institutes of Health
- National Institute of Statistical Sciences
- NetApp
- North Carolina state government (including University of NC system)
- Novo
- Nvidia
- Oracle Corporation
- Pfizer (Pfizer Poultry Health)
- PNC (PNC Financial Services Group, Inc.)
- Qualcomm
- Railinc Corporation
- Red Hat
- Research Triangle Institute
- SAS Institute
- Sony Ericsson
- Syngenta
- Teleflex Medical
- Toshiba Global Commerce Solutions
- Toyota
- Truist
- United States Forest Service
- Verizon
- Wake County Public School System
- WakeMed Hospital
- Wolfspeed

=== Major hospitals, medical centers and medical schools ===
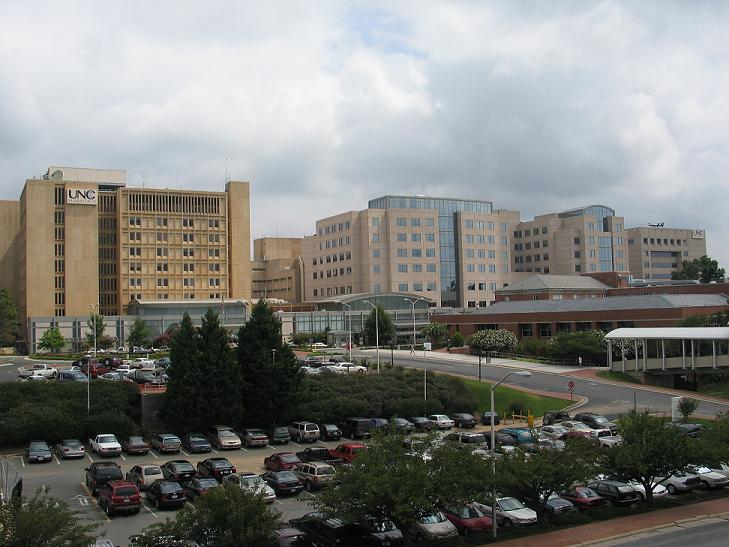
North Carolina Memorial and Children's hospitals in Chapel Hill

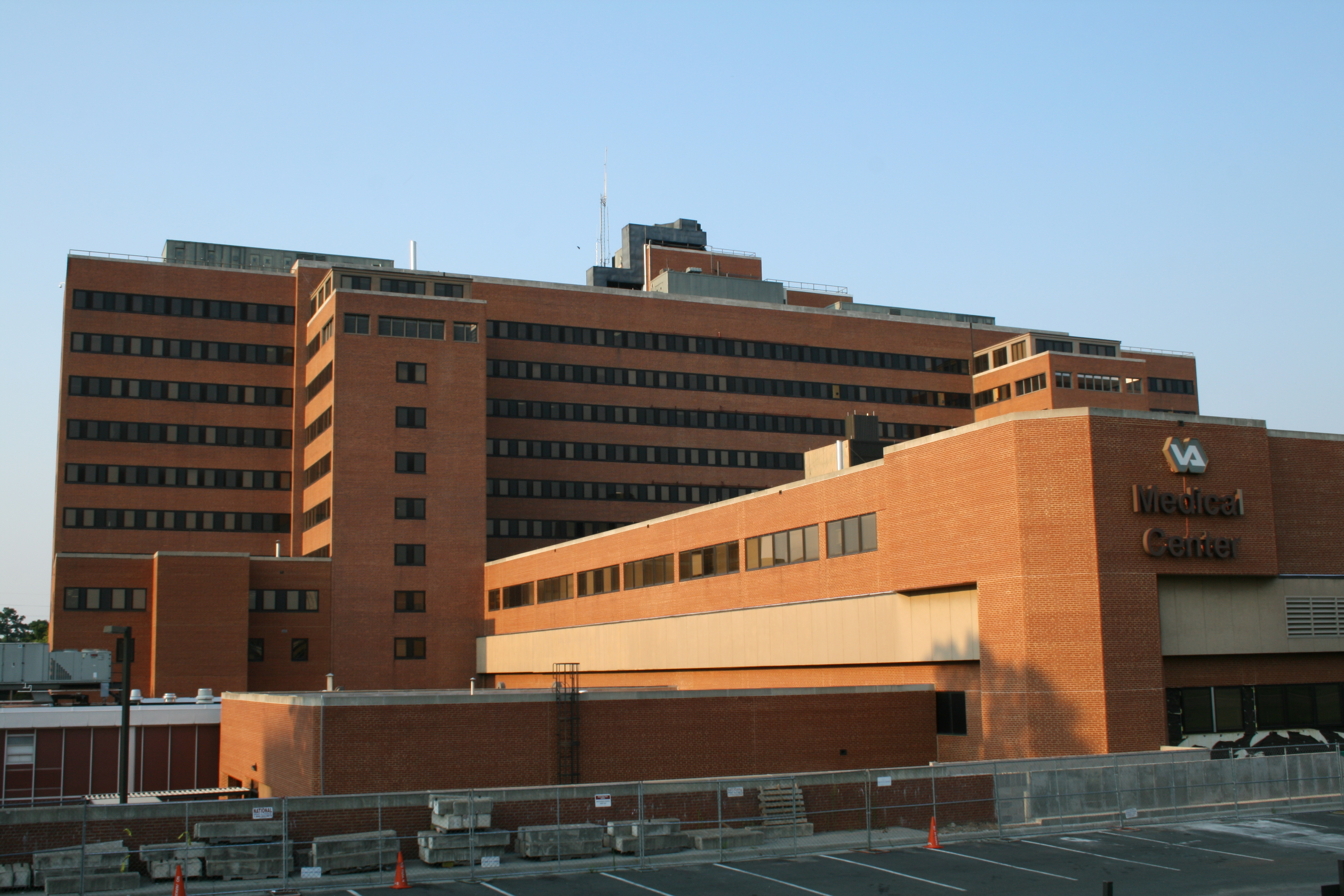
Durham VA Medical Center in Durham

The Research Triangle region is served by these hospitals and medical centers:

- Hospitals of the Duke University Health System
  - Duke Ambulatory Surgery Center (Durham)
  - Duke Children's Hospital and Health Center (Durham)
  - Duke Raleigh Hospital (formerly Raleigh Community Hospital)
  - Duke University Medical Center (Durham)
  - Duke Regional Hospital (formerly Durham Regional Hospital)
  - Person Memorial Hospital (Roxboro)
- Hospitals of the UNC Health Care system
  - Chatham Hospital (Siler City)
  - North Carolina Cancer Hospital (Chapel Hill)
  - North Carolina Children's Hospital (Chapel Hill)
  - North Carolina Memorial Hospital (Chapel Hill)
  - North Carolina Neurosciences Hospital (Chapel Hill)
  - North Carolina Women's Hospital (Chapel Hill)
  - Rex Hospital (Raleigh)
  - UNC Health Johnston (Smithfield)
- Hospitals of the WakeMed system
  - WakeMed Raleigh Campus (formerly Wake Memorial Hospital and Wake Medical Center)
  - WakeMed North Hospital
  - WakeMed Cary Hospital (formerly Western Wake Medical Center)
- Other hospitals and medical centers
  - Central Regional Hospital (Butner)
  - Durham VA Medical Center (Durham)
  - Franklin Regional Medical Center (Louisburg)
- Cape Fear Valley Health System (formerly Harnett Health) (Fayetteville)
  - Betsy Johnson Regional Hospital
  - Angier Medical Services
  - Good Hope Hospital
  - Betsy Johnson Cancer Research Clinic
  - Central Harnett Hospital
- Medical Schools
  - Duke University School of Medicine
  - University of North Carolina at Chapel Hill School of Medicine
  - Campbell University School of Osteopathic Medicine

== Transportation ==
=== Freeways and primary designated routes ===
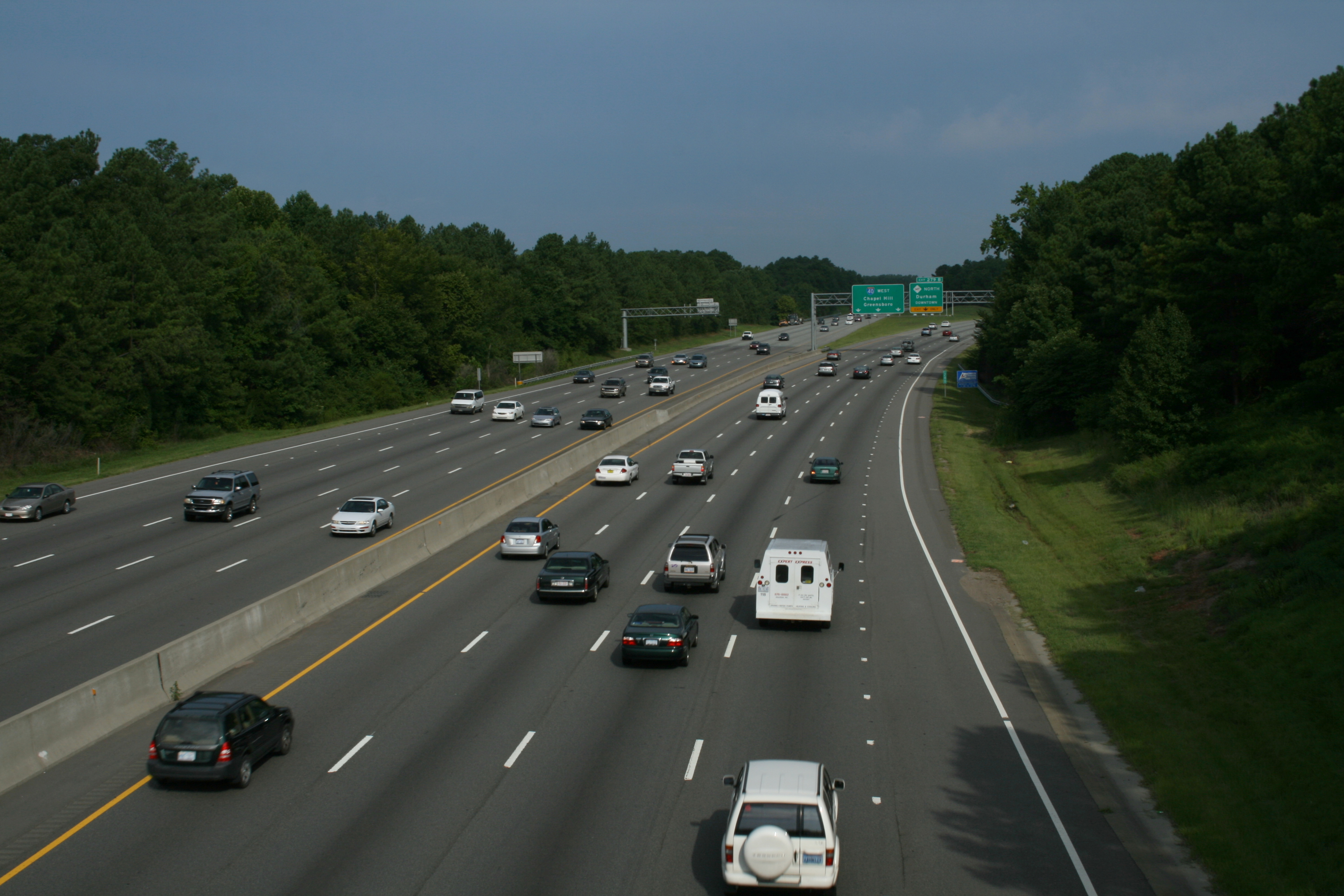
I-40 passing through the Research Triangle Park

The Triangle proper is served by four major interstate highways: I-40, I-42, I-85, and I-87 along with their spurs: I-885, I-440, and I-540, and seven U.S. Routes: 1, 15, 64, 70, 264, 401, and 501. US Highways 15 and 501 are multiplexed through much of the region as US 15-501. I-95 passes 30 miles east of Raleigh through Johnston County, with I-87 connecting I-95 at Rocky Mount, NC to Raleigh via the US 64–264 Bypass.

The two interstates diverge from one another in Orange County, with I-85 heading northeast through northern Durham County toward Virginia, while I-40 travels southeast through southern Durham, through the center of the region, and serves as the primary freeway through Raleigh. The related loop freeways I-440 and I-540 are primarily located in Wake County around Raleigh. I-440 begins at the interchange of US 1 and I-40 southwest of downtown Raleigh and arcs as a multiplex with US 1 northward around downtown with the formal designation as the Cliff Benson/Raleigh Beltline (cosigned with US 1 on three-fourths of its northern route) and ends at its junction with I-40 in southeast Raleigh. I-540, sometimes known as the Raleigh Outer Loop, extends from the US 64–264 Bypass to I-40 just inside Durham County, where it continues across the interstate as a state route (NC 540), prior to it becoming a toll road from the NC 54 interchange to the current terminus at I-40 and I-42 near Garner. I-95 serves the extreme eastern edge of the region, crossing north–south through suburban Johnston County.

U.S. Routes 1, 15, and 64 primarily serve the region as limited-access freeways or multilane highways with access roads. US 1 enters the region from the southwest as the Claude E. Pope Memorial Highway and travels through suburban Apex where it merges with US 64 and continues northeast through Cary. The two highways are codesignated for about 2 miles (3.2 km) until US 1 joins I-440 and US 64 with I-40 along the Raleigh–Cary border. Capital Boulevard, which is designated US 1 for half of its route and US 401 the other is not a limited-access freeway, although it is a major thoroughfare through northeast Raleigh and into the northern downtown area.

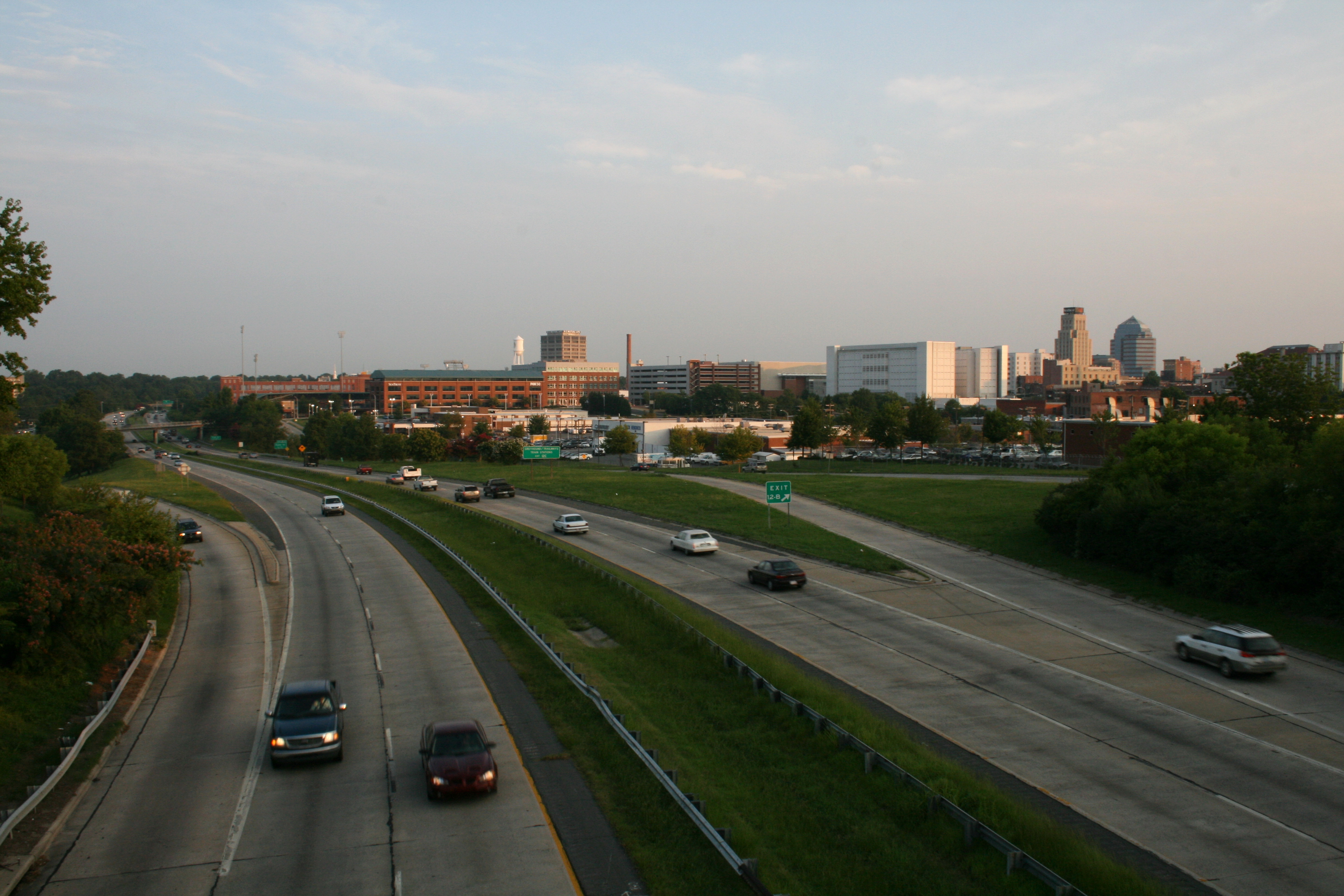
Durham Freeway

North Carolina Highway 147 is a limited-access freeway that connects I-85 with Toll Route NC 540 in northwestern Wake County. The older, toll-free portion of the four-lane route—known as the Durham Freeway or the I.L. "Buck" Dean Expressway—traverses downtown Durham and extends through Research Triangle Park to I-40. The Durham Freeway is often used as a detour or alternate route for I-40 through southwestern Durham the Chapel Hill area in cases of traffic accident, congestion or road construction delays. The tolled portion of NC 147, called the Triangle Expressway—North Carolina's first modern toll road when it opened to traffic in late 2011—continues past I-40 to Toll NC 540. Both Toll NC 147 and Toll NC 540 are modern facilities which collect tolls using transponders and license plate photo-capture technology.

=== Public transit ===
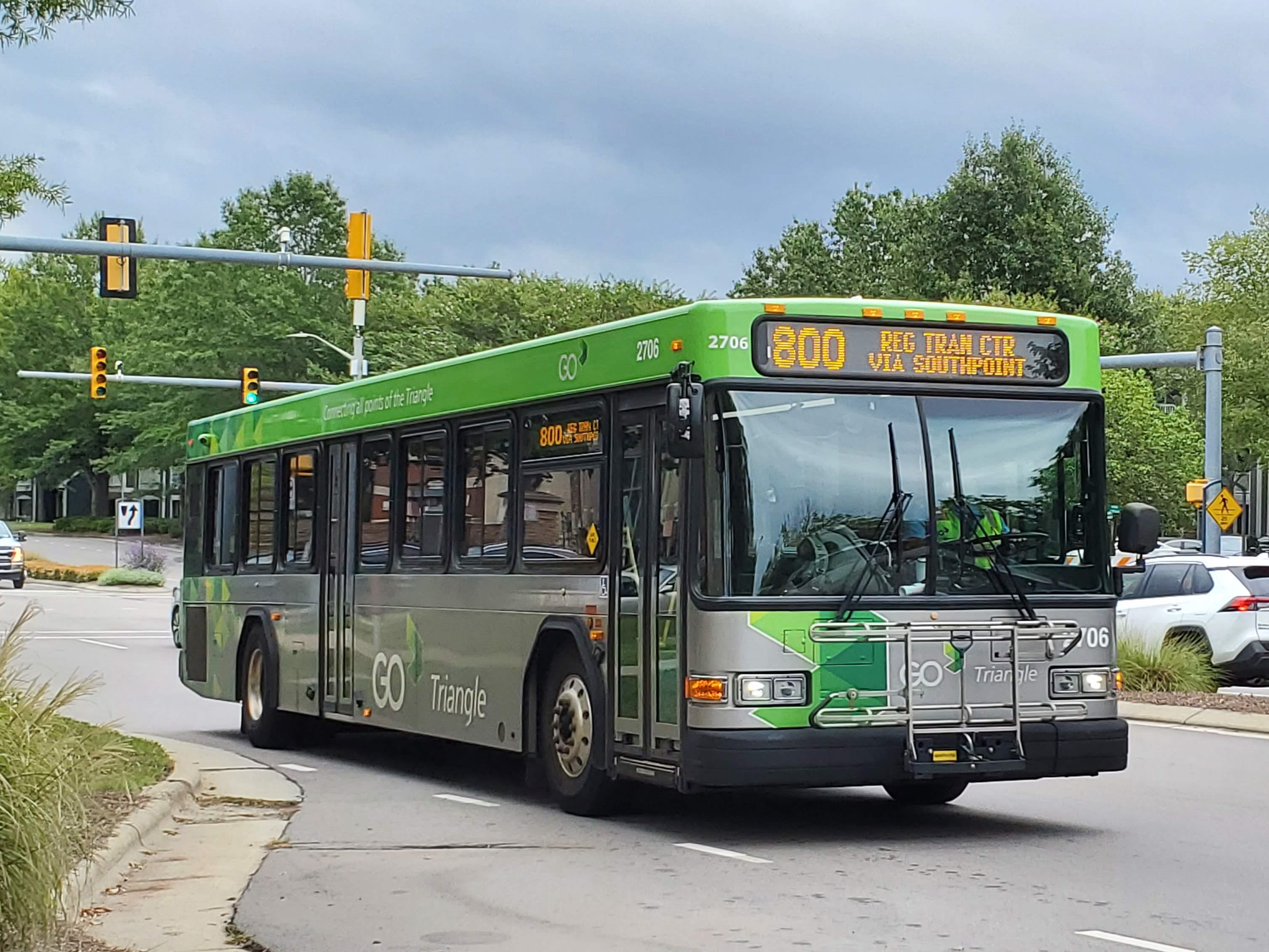
GoTriangle bus

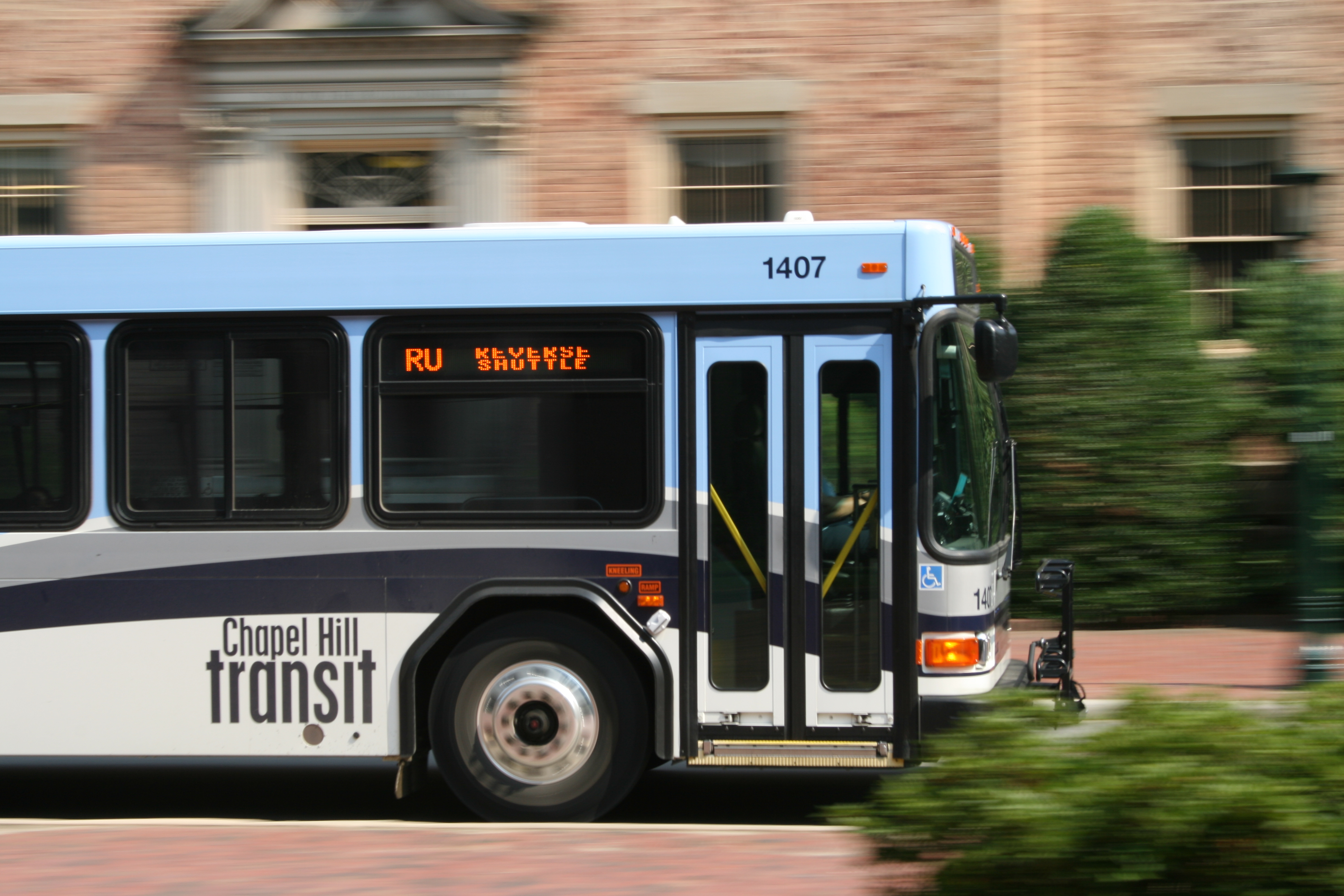
Chapel Hill Transit bus

A partnering system of multiple public transportation agencies currently serves the Triangle region under the joint GoTriangle branding. Raleigh is served by GoRaleigh (formerly Capital Area Transit) municipal transit system, while Durham has GoDurham (formerly the Durham Area Transit Authority). Chapel Hill is served by Chapel Hill Transit, and Cary is served by GoCary (formerly C-Tran) public transit systems. However, GoTriangle, formerly called Triangle Transit, works in cooperation with all area transit systems by offering transfers between its own routes and those of the other systems. Triangle Transit also coordinates an extensive vanpool and rideshare program that serves the region's larger employers and commute destinations.

=== Air ===
==== Raleigh–Durham International Airport (RDU) ====
(IATA: RDU, ICAO: KRDU, FAA LID: RDU)

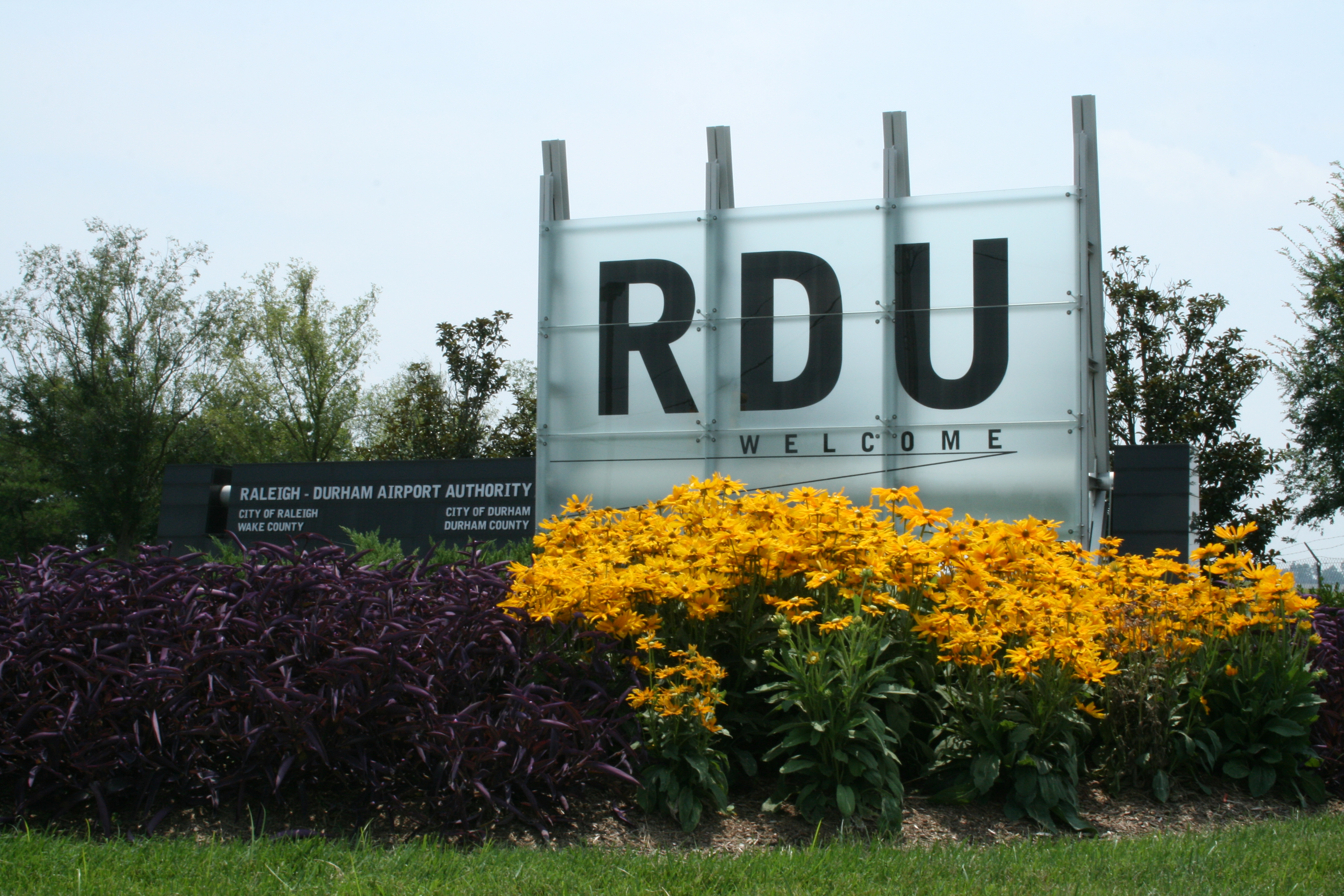
Raleigh–Durham International Airport welcome sign

Raleigh–Durham International Airport (RDU) has nonstop passenger service to 89 destinations, including nonstop international service to Canada, Europe, and Mexico. It is located near the geographic center of The Triangle, 4 1/2 miles (7.2 km) northeast of the town of Morrisville in Wake County. The airport covers 5,000 acres (2,023 ha) and has three runways.

In 1939 the General Assembly of North Carolina chartered the Raleigh–Durham Aeronautical Authority, which was changed in 1945 to the Raleigh–Durham Airport Authority. The first new terminal opened in 1955. Terminal A (now Terminal 1) opened in 1981. American Airlines began service to RDU in 1985.

RDU opened the 10,000-foot (3,000 m) runway, 5L-23R, in 1986. American Airlines opened its north–south hub operation at RDU in the new Terminal C in June 1987, greatly increasing the size of RDU's operations with a new terminal including a new apron and runway. American brought RDU its first international flights to Bermuda, Cancún, Paris and London.

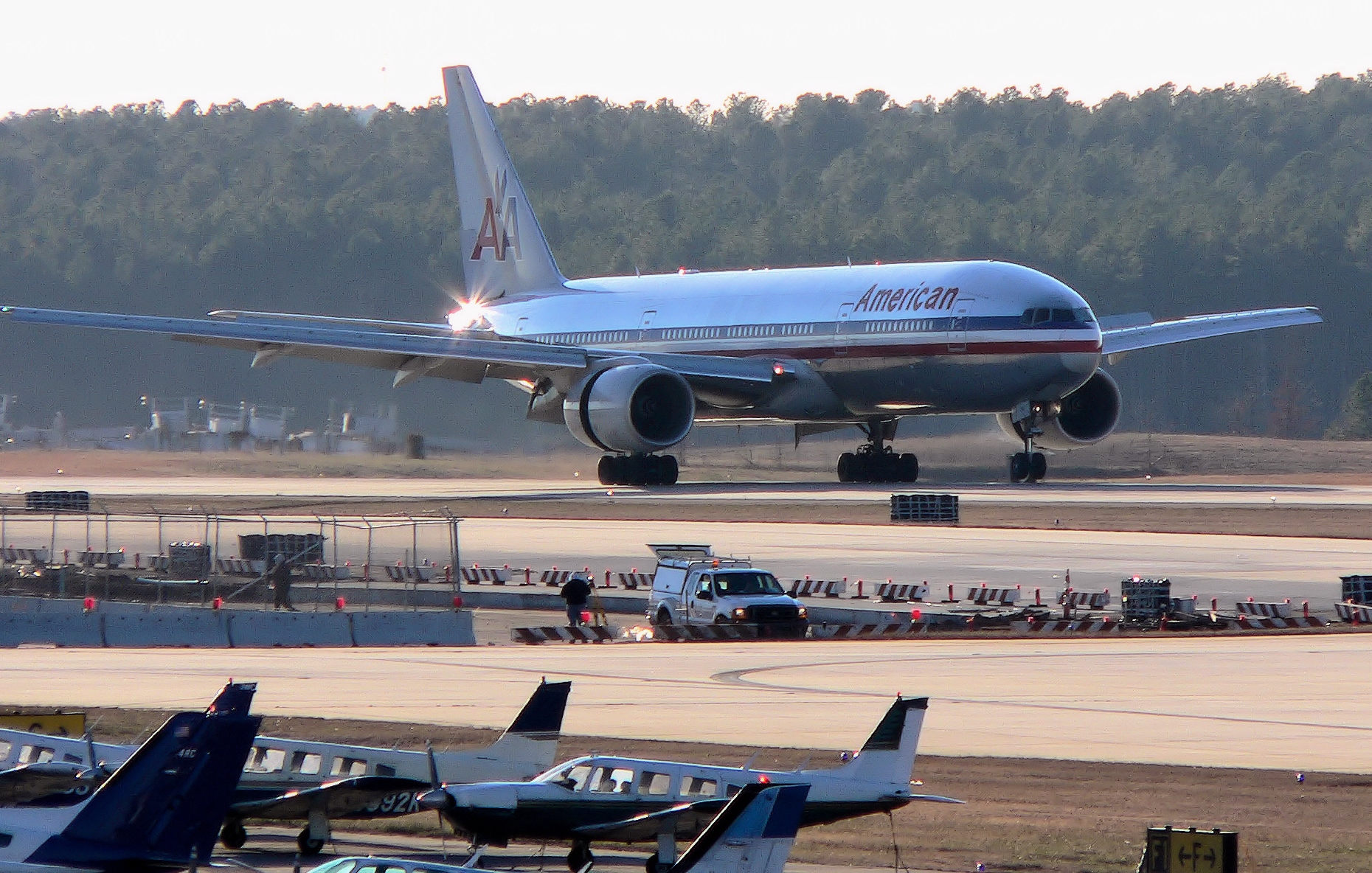
American Airlines Boeing 777 touches down at RDU

In 1996, American Airlines ceased its hub operations at RDU due to Pan Am and Eastern Airlines. Pan Am and Eastern were Miami's main tenants until 1991, when both carriers went bankrupt. Their hubs at MIA were taken over by United Airlines and American Airlines. This created a difficulty in competing with US Airways' hub in Charlotte and Delta Air Lines' hub in Atlanta, Georgia for passengers traveling between smaller cities in the North and South. Midway Airlines entered the market, starting service in 1995 with the then somewhat novel concept of 50-seat Canadair Regional Jets providing service from its RDU hub primarily along the East Coast. Midway, originally incorporated in Chicago, had some success after moving its operations to the midpoint of the eastern United States at RDU and its headquarters to Morrisville, NC. The carrier ultimately could not overcome three weighty challenges: the arrival of Southwest Airlines, the refusal of American Airlines to renew the frequent flyer affiliation it had with Midway (thus dispatching numerous higher fare-paying businesspeople to airlines with better reward destinations), and the significant blow of September 11, 2001. Midway Airlines filed Chapter 11 bankruptcy on August 13, 2001, and ceased operations entirely on October 30, 2003.

In February 2000, RDU was ranked as the nation's second fastest-growing major airport in the United States, by Airports Council International, based on 1999 statistics. Passenger growth hit 24% over the previous year, ranking RDU second only to Washington Dulles International Airport. RDU opened Terminal A south concourse for use by Northwest and Continental Airlines in 2001. The addition added 46,000 square feet (4,300 m^{2}) and five aircraft gates to the terminal. Terminal A became designated as Terminal 1 on October 26, 2008. In 2003, RDU also dedicated a new general aviation terminal. RDU continues to keep pace with its growth by redeveloping Terminal C into a new state-of-the-art terminal, now known as Terminal 2, which opened in October 2008.

As of June 2022, the airport will have international flights to Cancun, London, Montreal, Paris, Reykjavik and Toronto. Cancun and London service is provided by American, Frontier and JetBlue, while the Canada flights are provided by Air Canada, Paris by Delta, and Reykjavik by Icelandair. Icelandair is the first international carrier outside of Air Canada to service the airport. Delta Air Lines currently considers the airport to be a "focus city", or an airport that is not a hub, but is of importance to the carrier. The COVID-19 pandemic significantly shrunk the operation, but by September 2022, Delta will be serving 21 destinations on aircraft ranging from the CRJ700 to the 767.

==== Public general-aviation airports ====
In addition to RDU, several smaller publicly owned general-aviation airports also operate in the metropolitan region:

- Triangle North Executive Airport (IATA: LFN, ICAO: KLHZ, FAA LID: LHZ), Louisburg
- Raleigh Exec (ICAO: KTTA, FAA LID: TTA), Sanford
- Johnston County Airport (IATA: JNX, ICAO: KJNX, FAA LID: JNX), Smithfield
- Horace Williams Airport (IATA: IGX, ICAO: KIGX, FAA LID: IGX), Chapel Hill (Closed)
- Harnett Regional Jetport (IATA: HRJ, ICAO: KHRJ, FAA LID: HRJ), Erwin
- Person County Airport (ICAO: KTDF, FAA LID: TDF), Roxboro
- Siler City Municipal Airport (ICAO: K5W8, FAA LID: 5W8), Siler City

==== Private airfields ====
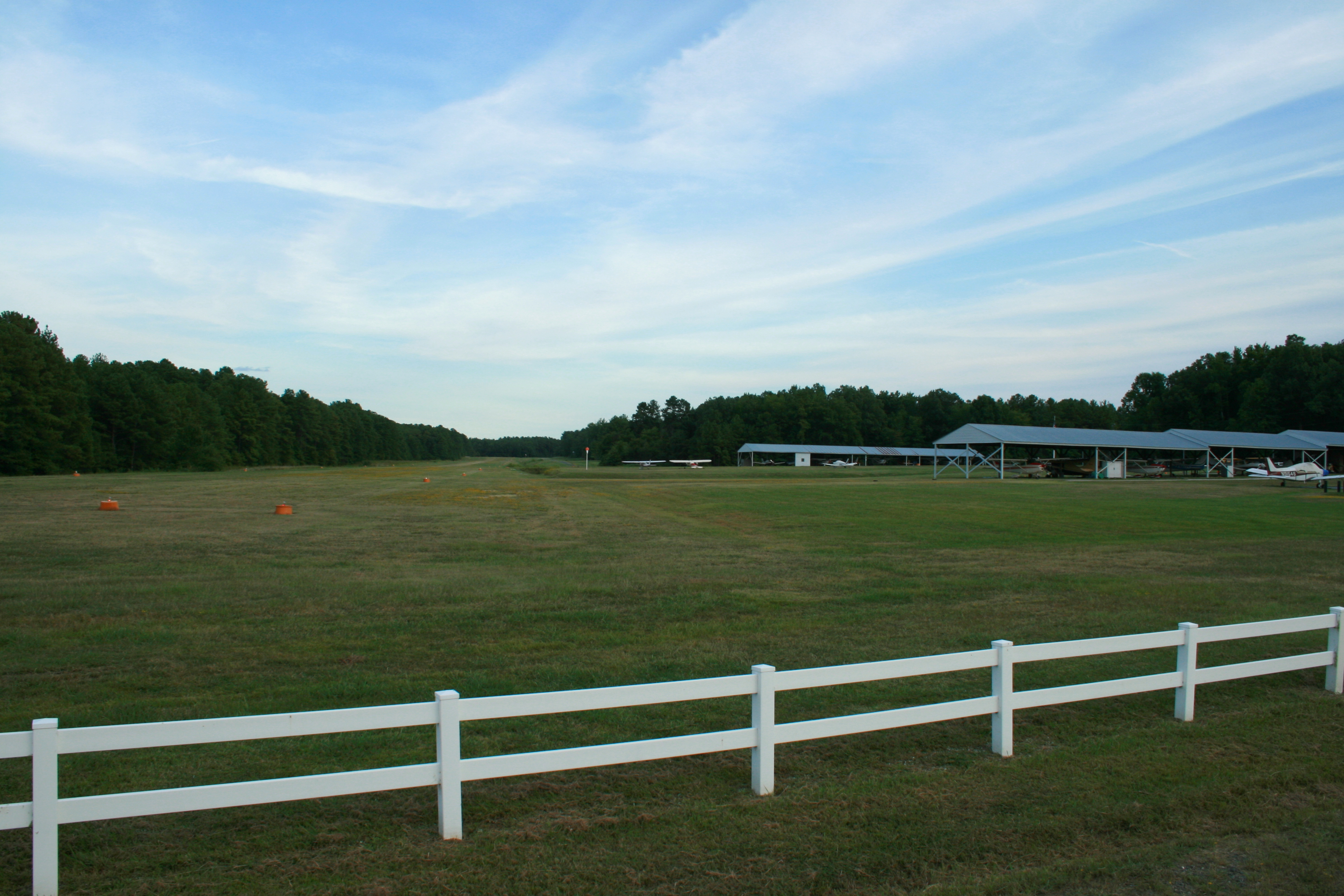
Lake Ridge Airport (8NC8) in Durham

Several licensed private general-aviation and agricultural airfields are located in the region's suburban areas and nearby rural communities:

- Bagwell Airport (FAA LID: NC99), Garner
- Ball Airport (FAA LID: 79NC), Louisburg
- Barclaysville Field Airport (FAA LID: NC44), Angier
- Brooks Field Airport (FAA LID: 8NC6), Siler City
- CAG Farms Airport (FAA LID: 87NC), Angier
- Charles Field Airport (FAA LID: NC22), Dunn
- Cox Airport (FAA LID: NC81), Apex
- Crooked Creek Airport (FAA LID: 7NC5), Bunn
- Dead Dog Airport (FAA LID: 8NC4), Pittsboro
- Deck Airpark Airport (FAA LID: NC11), Apex
- Dutchy Airport (FAA LID: 5NC5), Chapel Hill
- Eagle's Landing Airport (FAA LID: 9NC8), Pittsboro
- Field of Dreams Airport (FAA LID: 51NC), Zebulon
- Fuquay/Angier Field Airport (FAA LID: 78NC), Fuquay-Varina
- Hinton Field Airport (FAA LID: NC72), Princeton
- Kenly Airport (FAA LID: 7NC3), Kenly
- Lake Ridge Aero Park Airport (FAA LID: 8NC8), Durham
- Miles Airport (FAA LID: NC34), Chapel Hill
- North Raleigh Airport (FAA LID: 00NC), Louisburg
- Peacock Stolport Airport (FAA LID: 4NC7), Garner
- Raleigh East Airport (FAA LID: 9NC0), Knightdale
- Riley Field Airport (FAA LID: 1NC5), Bunn
- Ron's Field Ultralight Airport (FAA LID: 1NC1), Pittsboro
- Triple W Airport (ICAO: K5W5, FAA LID: 5W5), Raleigh
- Womble Field Airport (FAA LID: 3NC9), Chapel Hill

==== Heliports ====
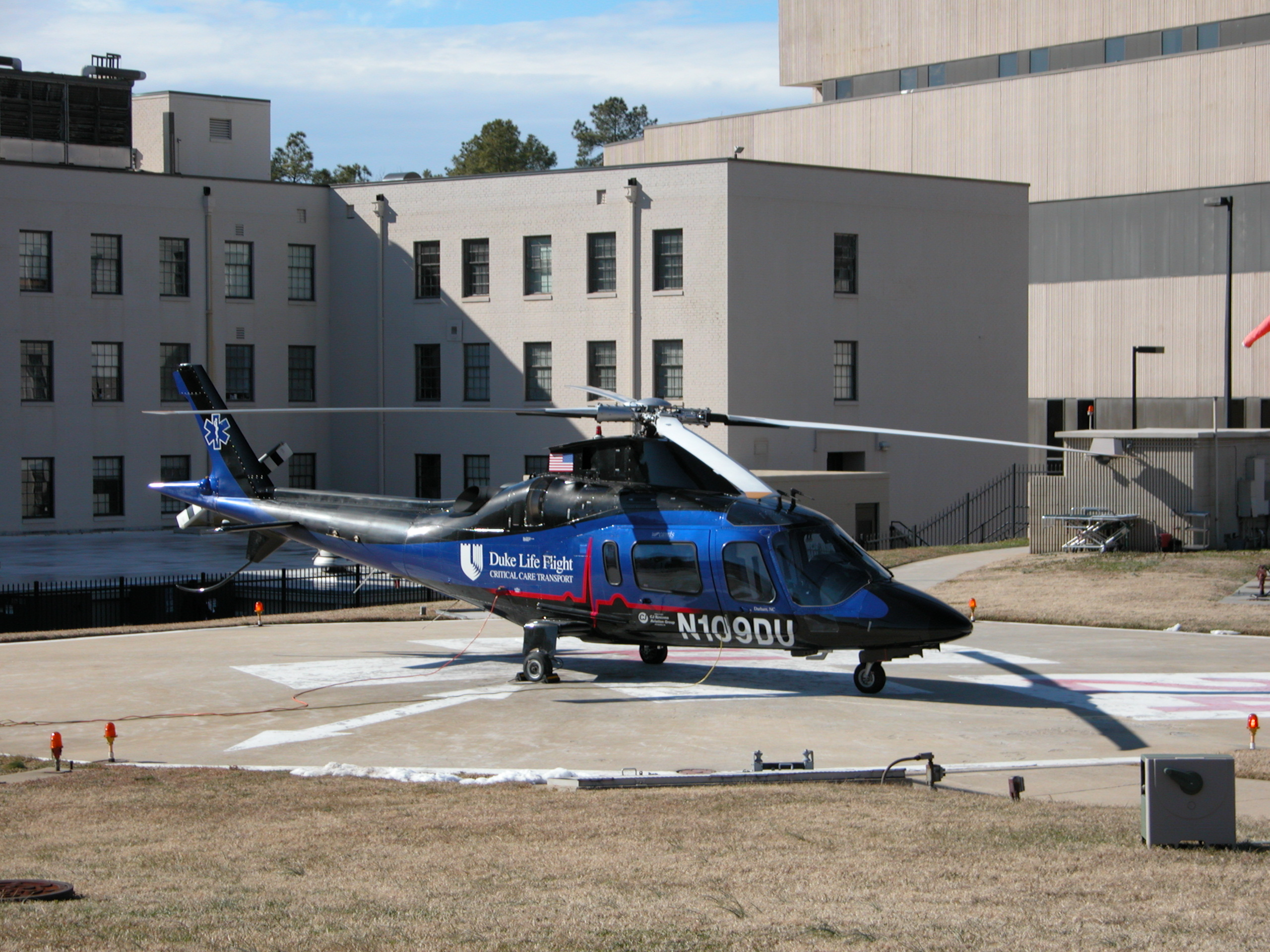
NC92 helipad at Duke University Medical Center

These licensed heliports serve the Research Triangle region:

- Betsy Johnson Memorial Hospital Heliport (FAA LID: NC96), Dunn—publicly owned; medical service
- Duke University North Heliport (ICAO: NC92, FAA LID: NC92), Durham—privately owned; public medical service
- Garner Road Heliport (FAA LID: 3NC2), Raleigh—publicly owned; state government service
- Holly Green Heliport (FAA LID: 83NC), Durham—private
- Sky-5 Heliport (FAA LID: 2NC3), Raleigh—private, owned by Sky-5 Inc. (WRAL-TV)
- Sprint MidAtlantic Telecom Heliport (FAA LID: 11NC), Youngsville—private; corporate service
- Wake Medical Center Heliport (FAA LID: 0NC4), Raleigh—publicly owned; medical service
- Western Wake Medical Center Heliport (FAA LID: 04NC), Cary—publicly owned; medical service
- Cape Fear Valley Central Harnett Hospital (FAA LID: 42NR), Lillington—publicly owned; medical service; opened in Fall 2013

A number of helipads (i.e. marked landing sites not classified under the FAA LID system) also serve a variety of additional medical facilities (such as UNC Hospitals in Chapel Hill), as well as private, corporate and governmental interests, throughout the region.

=== Rail ===
Amtrak serves the region with the Silver Meteor, Silver Star, Palmetto, Carolinian, and Piedmont routes.

Station\Route	Silver Meteor	Silver Star	Palmetto	Carolinian	Piedmont
Selma (SSM)			X	X	
Fayetteville (FAY)	X		X		
Southern Pines (SOP)		X			
Raleigh (RGH)		X		X	X
Cary (CYN)		X		X	X
Durham (DNC)				X	X

== Shopping ==
=== Super-regional enclosed malls ===
- Triangle Town Center and Commons (Raleigh; 1,431,091 ft²) (opened 2002)
- The Streets at Southpoint (Durham; 1,336,000 ft²) (opened 2002)
- Crabtree Mall (Raleigh; 1,326,000 ft²) (opened 1972)
- Cary Towne Center (Cary; 914,252 ft²) (opened 1979, closed 2021)
- Northgate Mall (Durham; 857,099 ft²) (opened 1960, enclosed 1972, closed 2020)

=== Major shopping centers ===
- Crossroads Plaza (Cary; 1,300,000 ft²)
- Village District (Raleigh; 656,000 ft²)
- Carolina Premium Outlets (Smithfield; 440,000 ft²)
- University Place (Chapel Hill; 366,000 ft²)
- Carr Mill Mall (Carrboro; 86,000 ft²)
- Tanger Outlet Center (Mebane; 317,000 ft²)
- North Hills Mall & Plaza (Raleigh)
- The Streets at Southpoint (Durham; 1,330,000 ft²)

== Entertainment ==
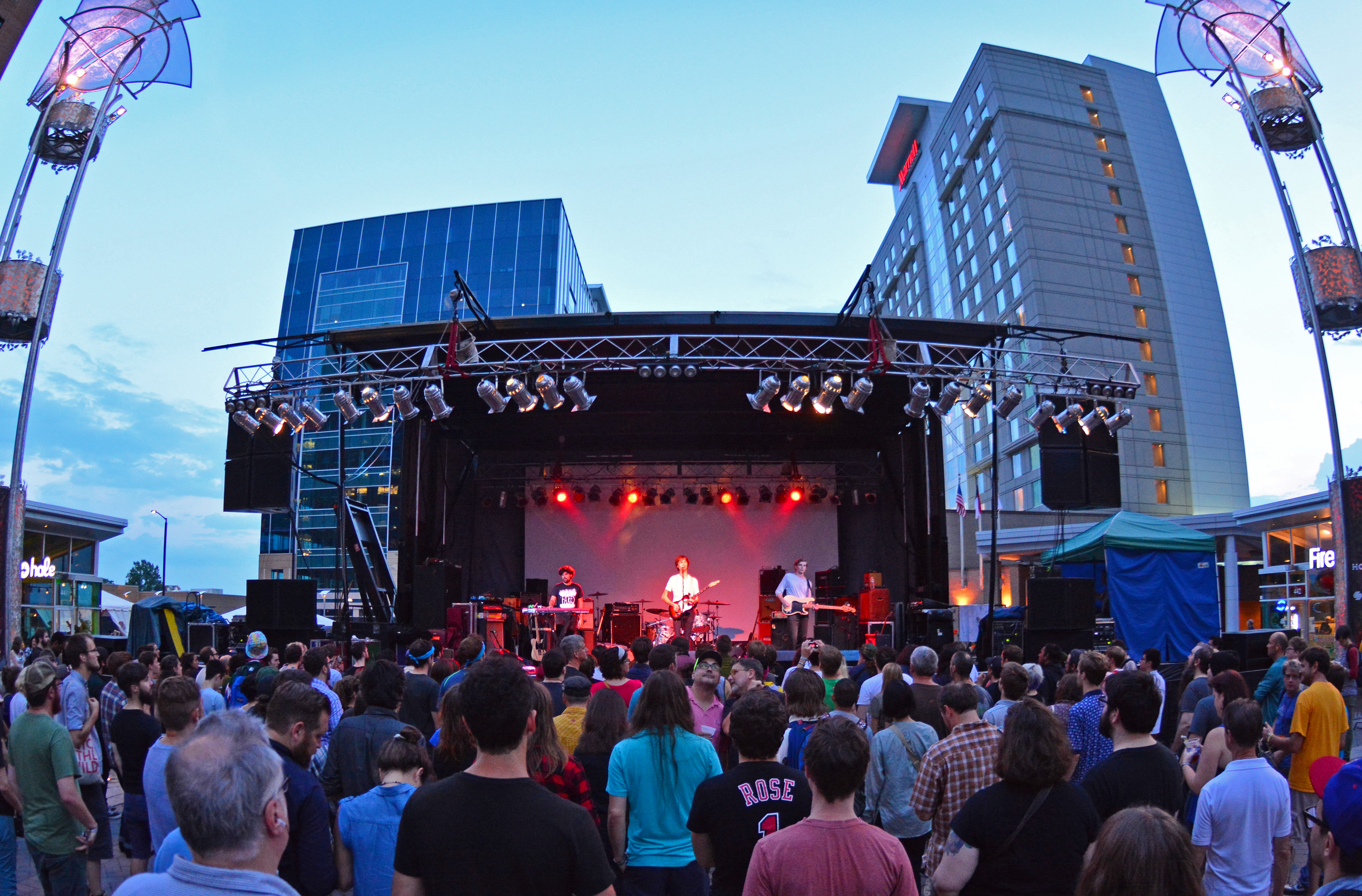
The annual Hopscotch Music Festival takes place over three days in September in downtown Raleigh.

Film festivals and events:

- Full Frame Documentary Film Festival – Durham
- North Carolina Gay & Lesbian Film Festival – Durham

Notable performing arts and music venues:

- Cat's Cradle – Carrboro
- Coastal Credit Union Music Park – Raleigh
- Red Hat Amphitheater – downtown Raleigh
- Koka Booth Amphitheatre at Regency Park – Cary
- Martin Marietta Center for the Performing Arts – downtown Raleigh
- Lenovo Center – Raleigh
- The Ritz - Raleigh
- Lincoln Theatre - Raleigh
- Durham Performing Arts Center – Durham
- Carolina Theatre – Durham
- The Fruit – Durham
- Joseph M. Bryan, Jr. Theater – Raleigh
- The Pinhook – Durham
- Hayti Heritage Cultural Center – Durham

Theatre and dance events:

- American Dance Festival – Durham
- Wake Forest Dance Festival – Wake Forest
- Raleigh Little Theatre – Raleigh

Music festivals:

- Dreamville Festival – Raleigh
- Hopscotch Music Festival – Raleigh
- Moogfest – Durham
- ProgDay – Chapel Hill
- Shakori Hills Grassroots Festival – Pittsboro
- Eno River Festival – Durham

Movie theatres:

- Alamo Drafthouse Cinema – Raleigh
- AMC Theatres at The Streets at Southpoint – Durham
- Carolina Theatre – Durham
- Silverspot Cinema – Chapel Hill
- The Rialto – Raleigh

== Museums ==
Greater Raleigh metropolitan area, North Carolina museums
Museum name	Image	City	Type	Notes
21c Museum Hotel		Durham	Art	
Ackland Art Museum		Chapel Hill	Art	
Artspace		Raleigh	Art	
Ayr Mount		Hillsborough	History	
Bennett Place State Historic Site		Durham	History	
Carolina Basketball Museum		Chapel Hill	Sports	
Carolina Tiger Rescue		Pittsboro	Science	
Contemporary Art Museum of Raleigh		Raleigh	Art	
Duke Homestead		Durham	History	
Gregg Museum of Art & Design		Raleigh	Art	
Joel Lane Museum House		Raleigh	History	
Kidzu Children's Museum		Chapel Hill	Children	
Legends of Harley Drag Racing Museum		Raleigh	Sports	
Marbles Kids Museum		Raleigh	Children	formerly Exploris
Meredith College Galleries		Raleigh	Art	
Mordecai Mansion		Raleigh	History	
Morehead Planetarium and Science Center		Chapel Hill	Science	home to astronaut training for years
Museum of Life and Science		Durham	Science	includes small outdoor zoo
North Carolina Museum of Art		Raleigh	Art	expanded in 2010
North Carolina Museum of History		Raleigh	History	also home to North Carolina Sports Hall of Fame
North Carolina Museum of Natural Science		Raleigh	Science	annual BugFest and Astronomy Days
Raleigh City Museum		Raleigh	History	
North Carolina State Capitol		Raleigh	History	
North Carolina State University Insect Museum		Raleigh	Science	
Nasher Museum of Art		Durham	Art	
NCCU Art Museum		Durham	Art	
Page-Walker Arts & History Center		Cary	History	

== Gardens and parks ==
- JC Raulston Arboretum – Raleigh
- Bond Park – Cary
- John Chavis Memorial Park – Raleigh
- Dorothea Dix Park – Raleigh
- Sarah P. Duke Gardens – Durham
- Durham Central Park – Durham
- Durant Nature Preserve – Raleigh
- Falls Lake State Recreation Area – Raleigh
- Hemlock Bluffs Nature Preserve – Cary
- Moore Square Park – Raleigh
- North Carolina Botanical Garden, Chapel Hill
- Occoneechee Mountain State Natural Area, Hillsborough
- Pullen Park – Raleigh
- Raleigh Rose Garden – Raleigh
- William B. Umstead State Park – Raleigh, Cary, Durham

== Lakes ==
- Lake Crabtree – Cary
- Eno Rock Quarry – Durham
- Falls Lake – Raleigh
- Fantasy Lake – Wake Forest
- Hyco Lake – Roxboro
- Jordan Lake – Durham
- Lake Michie – Bahama
- Shelley Lake – Raleigh

== Media ==
The area is part of the Raleigh–Durham–Fayetteville television designated media area and is the 25th-largest in the country with 1,135,920 households (2014) included in that area and the second largest television market in North Carolina. It is part of the Raleigh–Durham Nielsen Audio radio market (code 115) and is the 42nd-largest in the country with a population of 1,365,900.

The Raleigh–Durham–Fayetteville market is defined by Nielsen as including Chatham, Cumberland, Dunn, Durham, Granville, Halifax, Harnett, Hoke, Johnston, Lee, Moore, Northampton, Orange, Robeson, Vance, Wake, Warren, Wayne, and Wilson Counties, along with parts of Franklin County.

=== Print ===
Numerous newspapers and periodicals serve the Triangle market.

==== Paid and subscription ====
- The News & Observer, the major daily Raleigh newspaper and the region's largest, with a significant regional and statewide readership (especially to the east of the Triangle)
- The Herald-Sun, the major daily Durham newspaper
- Garner News, the weekly community newspaper for suburban Garner in southern Wake County
- The Apex Herald, the weekly community newspaper for suburban Apex in western Wake County
- Holly Springs Sun, the weekly community newspaper for suburban Holly Springs in southwestern Wake County
- Butner-Creedmoor News The Weekly community newspaper for southern Granville County and surrounding areas
- Cleveland Post, the weekly community newspaper for suburban Cleveland and nearby northwestern Johnston and southern Wake Counties
- Fuquay-Varina Independent, the weekly community newspaper for suburban Fuquay-Varina in southwestern Wake County
- The Wake Weekly, a weekly community newspaper serving suburban Wake Forest, northern Wake County and southern Franklin County
- The Chatham Journal, the weekly community newspaper for suburban Pittsboro and surrounding Chatham County
- The Clayton News-Star, a weekly community newspaper for suburban Clayton and western Johnston County
- The Daily Record, the daily community newspaper for suburban Dunn and surrounding Harnett County
- The Courier-Times, the semiweekly community newspaper for suburban Roxboro and Person County
- Triangle Business Journal, a weekly regional economic journal
- Cary Magazine, a bi-monthly magazine for Cary and western Wake County
- Chapel Hill Magazine, a bi-monthly magazine that serves 12,500 households and 1,600 businesses of Chapel Hill, Carrboro, Hillsborough and northern Chatham County
- Triangle Free Press, a non-profit volunteer based print and digital newspaper that focuses on stories about the working class' struggle for a just society

==== Free ====
- The Independent Weekly, a free weekly regional independent journal published in Durham
- The Carolina Journal, a monthly free regional newspaper published in Raleigh
- The Raleigh Downtowner, a free monthly magazine for downtown Raleigh and environs
- The Raleigh Hatchet, a free monthly magazine
- The Daily Tar Heel, the free weekday (during the regular academic year) student newspaper at UNC-Chapel Hill
- Technician, the free weekday (during the regular academic year) student newspaper at NC State University in Raleigh
- The Chronicle, a free daily newspaper for (but independent of) Duke University and its surrounding community in Durham
- The Blotter, a free monthly regional literary journal
- Fifteen-501, a free magazine for the Durham–Chapel Hill area (named for nearby U.S. Route 15-501)
- Acento Latino, a free Spanish-language weekly regional newspaper published in Raleigh
- Midtown Magazine, a free bi-monthly lifestyle magazine published in Raleigh

==== Online only ====
- The Cary Citizen, a free daily news source for the greater Cary and western Wake County area
- The Raleigh Telegram, a free daily news source for the greater Raleigh area
- The Wake Forest Gazette, a free weekly news site for items of local Wake Forest interest
- The Johnston County Report, a free daily news source for Johnston County and the surrounding areas

=== Television ===
==== Broadcast ====
The Triangle is part of the Raleigh–Durham–Fayetteville Designated Market Area for broadcast television. As of 2015–16, the area was the 25th-largest in the country. This area includes these television stations:

- WUNC-TV (4, Chapel Hill), PBS member station and flagship station of the PBS North Carolina television network, owned by the University of North Carolina system
- WRAL-TV (5, Raleigh), NBC affiliate owned by Capitol Broadcasting Company
- WTVD (11, Durham), ABC O&O owned by ABC Owned Television Stations
- WNCN (17, Goldsboro), CBS affiliate owned by Nexstar Media Group
- WLFL (22, Raleigh), CW affiliate owned by Sinclair Broadcast Group
- WTNC-LD (26, Durham), UniMás O&O owned by TelevisaUnivision
- WRDC (28, Durham), MyNetworkTV affiliate owned by Sinclair Broadcast Group
- WRAY-TV (30, Wilson), TCT O&O owned by Tri-State Christian Television
- WUVC-DT (40, Fayetteville), Univision O&O owned by TelevisaUnivision
- WRPX-TV (47, Rocky Mount) and WFPX-TV (62, Fayetteville), both Ion Television O&Os owned by Scripps Networks
- WRAZ-TV (50, Raleigh), Fox affiliate owned by Capitol Broadcasting Company

==== Cable ====
Raleigh is home to the Research Triangle Region bureau of the regional cable TV news channel Spectrum News 1 North Carolina.

=== Radio ===
The Triangle is home to North Carolina Public Radio, a public radio station/NPR provider that brings in listeners around the country. Raleigh and a large part of the Triangle area is Arbitron radio market #43. Stations include:

FM stations:

- 88.1 FM WKNC (NCSU) College Radio from N.C. State University
- 88.5 FM WRTP (RTN) Christian ("His Radio WRTP")
- 88.7 FM WXDU (DU) College Radio from Duke University
- 88.9 FM WRKV (EMF) Contemporary Christian ("K-LOVE") from Educational Media Foundation
- 89.3 FM WXYC (UNC) College Radio from UNC-Chapel Hill
- 89.7 FM WCPE Classical & Opera Music
- 90.5 FM WVRD (Liberty University) Christian
- 90.7 FM WNCU (NCCU) NPR/Jazz from N.C. Central University
- 91.1 FM W216BN (RTN) Christian ("His Radio WRTP") (Translator of WRTP)
- 91.5 FM WUNC (UNC) NPR affiliate from UNC-Chapel Hill
- 92.5 FM WYFL (BBN) Christian Programs from Bible Broadcasting Network
- 93.3 FM WERO (NM License, LLC) CHR ("Bob 933")
- 93.5 FM WRLY-LP Community Radio ("Oak 93.5")
- 93.9 FM WNCB (iHM) Country ("B93.9")
- 94.3 FM W232CH(EMF) christian contemporary (K-LOVE)
- 94.7 FM WQDR-FM (CMG) Country ("94.7 QDR") 9
- 95.3 FM W237BZ (iHM) Classic Hip-Hop ("95.3 The Beat") (Translator of WDCG-HD2)
- 96.1 FM WBBB (CMG) Adult hits ("96.1 BBB")
- 96.5 FM W243DK (CBC) Sports ("The Buzz") (Translator of WCMC-HD2)
- 96.7 FM WKRX Country ("Kickin' Country")
- 96.9 FM WPLW-FM (CMG) CHR ("Pulse FM")
- 97.5 FM WQOK (R1) Hip Hop ("K-97.5")
- 97.9 FM W250BP ("97.9 The Hill") (Translator of WCHL)
- 98.1 FM WQSM (Cumulus) CHR ("Q-98")
- 98.9 FM W255AM (RTN) Christian ("His Radio WRTP") (Translator of WRTP)
- 99.3 FM W257CS (CBC) Sports ("The Buzz") (Translator of WCMC-HD2)
- 99.9 FM WCMC (CBC) Sports ("99.9 The Fan ESPN Radio") (Flagship for Carolina Hurricanes)
- 100.7 FM WRDU (iHM) Classic Hits ("100.7 WRDU")
- 101.1 FM WYMY (CMG) Spanish ("La Ley 101.1 FM")
- 101.5 FM WRAL (CBC) Adult Contemporary ("Mix 101.5")
- 101.9 FM WKRP-LP Community Radio ("101 Nine WKRP")
- 102.3 FM WKJO Classic Hits ("Kix 102")
- 102.5 FM WKXU (CMG) Classic Hits ("Kix 102")
- 102.9 FM WKIX (CMG) Classic Hits ("Kix 102")
- 103.3 FM WAKG (PB) Country ("103.3 WAKG")
- 103.5 FM WCOM-LP Community Radio, Variety
- 103.9 FM WNNL (R1) Urban Gospel ("The Light 103.9")
- 104.3 FM WFXK (R1) Urban Adult Contemporary ("Foxy 104")
- 104.7 FM W284CP (CMG) Top-40 ("Pulse FM") (Translator of WPLW-FM)
- 105.1 FM WDCG (iHM) CHR ("G-105")
- 106.1 FM WTKK (iHM) Talk
- 106.7 FM WKVK (EMF) Contemporary Christian
- 107.1 FM WFXC (R1) Urban Adult Contemporary ("Foxy 107")
- 107.7 FM W299AP (RTN) Christian ("His Radio WRTP") (Translator of WRTP)
- 107.9 FM W300CE (RTN) Christian ("His Radio WRTP") (Translator of WRTP)

AM stations:

- 540 AM WETC Catholic radio
- 570 AM WQDR Classic rock ("Rock 92.9")
- 620 AM WDNC Sports ("620 The Ticket") (Flagship for Duke Football and Basketball)
- 680 AM WPTF News, Talk & Sports ("NewsRadio 680 WPTF")
- 750 AM WAUG Urban Programming from St. Augustine's College
- 850 AM WKIX Oldies ("Oldies 104.7")
- 1000 AM WRTG Spanish
- 1030 AM WDRU Christian ("The Truth 1030")
- 1130 AM WPYB Country
- 1240 AM WPJL Christian
- 1310 AM WTIK Spanish
- 1360 AM WCHL ("97.9 The Hill")
- 1410 AM WRJD Spanish Christian
- 1430 AM WRXO Country ("Simulcast of WKRX-FM")
- 1490 AM WDUR South Asian
- 1530 AM WLLQ Spanish
- 1590 AM WHPY Christian

== Map of the Triangle ==
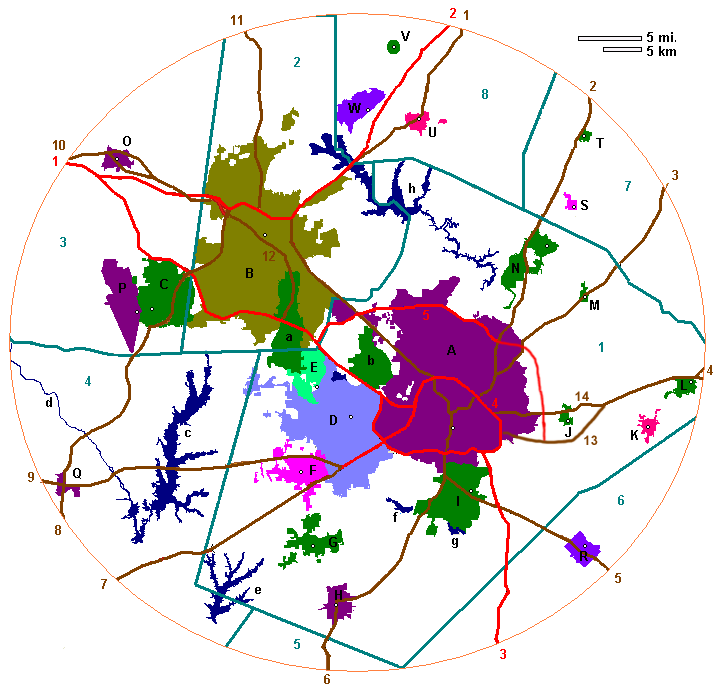
A map of the Triangle

Primary cities and towns

A – Raleigh
B – Durham
C – Chapel Hill
D – Cary
E – Morrisville
F – Apex
G – Holly Springs
H – Fuquay-Varina
I – Garner
J – Knightdale
K – Wendell
L – Zebulon
M – Rolesville
N – Wake Forest
O – Hillsborough
P – Carrboro
Q – Pittsboro
R – Clayton
S – Youngsville
T – Franklinton
U – Creedmoor
V – Stem
W – Butner

Counties

1 – Wake County
2 – Durham County
3 – Orange County
4 – Chatham County
5 – Harnett County
6 – Johnston County
7 – Franklin County
8 – Granville County

Parks and bodies of water

a – Research Triangle Park
b – Umstead State Park
c – Jordan Lake
d – Haw River
e – Harris Lake
f – Lake Wheeler
g – Lake Benson
h – Falls Lake

Interstate highways

1 – I-40/I-85
2 – I-85
3 – I-40
4 – I-440
5 – I-540
13 – I-87

Other major highways

1 – US 15
2 – US 1
3 – US 401
4 – US 64
5 – US 70
6 – US 401
7 – US 1
8 – US 15-501
9 – US 64
10 – US 70
11 – US 501
12 – NC 147
13 – US 64–264
14 – US 64 Business

== See also ==
- Piedmont Atlantic
- Piedmont Crescent
- Piedmont Triad
