= WRTP =

- Franklinton, North Carolina; United States
- Broadcast area: The Triangle
- Frequency: 88.5 MHz
- Branding: His Radio

Programming
- Format: Christian adult contemporary

Ownership
- Owner: Radio Training Network; (Radio Training Network, Inc.)
- Sister stations: WCCE, WLFA

History
- First air date: 1994
- Former call signs: WZRU (1992–2005)
- Call sign meaning: Radio Training Piedmont

Technical information
- Licensing authority: FCC
- Facility ID: 5018
- Class: C2
- ERP: 24,000 watts
- HAAT: 145.9 meters (479 ft)
- Transmitter coordinates: 36.2957°N 78.1055°W
- Translator: See § Translators
- Repeaters: 90.1 WCCE (Buies Creek); 100.7 WRDU-HD2 (Wake Forest)

Links
- Public license information: Public file; LMS
- Webcast: Listen live
- Website: www.hisradiowrtp.com

WRTP (88.5 FM) is a radio station broadcasting a Christian adult contemporary format. Licensed to Franklinton, North Carolina, United States, it serves the Raleigh–Durham area. The station is owned by Radio Training Network, with studios on Falls of Neuse Road in north Raleigh. Its transmitter is located near Warrenton.

== History ==
After Carolina Christian Communications sold WRTP (1530 AM) and simulcast stations WRTG and WGSB to Radio Training Network, that company bought WHGG-FM (90.1) in Roanoke Rapids, which was licensed to a school, and changed its name to WRTP-FM. The first translator, W216BN at 91.1 in Raleigh, signed on in 1999, giving the stations a nighttime signal in that area. W216BN moved from north Raleigh to the WSHA tower to prevent interference to WUNC-FM. Another translator was W257BH at 99.3 FM in Lizard Lick, serving eastern Wake County. In 2005, WRTP-FM moved to the 88.5 frequency, former home of WZRU. After WRTP (AM) was sold to Que Pasa Radio, WRTP-FM continued to broadcast, having increased to 24 hours a day, on a network of translators stretching from Chapel Hill to Greenville.

In 2014, WRTP moved its license to the Raleigh exurb of Franklinton.

== Translators ==
In addition to the main station, WRTP is relayed by full-power satellite WCCE in Fayetteville, plus an additional nine low-powered translators across east-central North Carolina. In 2019, iHeartMedia-owned and Wake Forest-licensed station WRDU began simulcasting WRTP on its second HD channel. Four of WRTP's translators were transferred to the WRDU license and officially repeat the WRDU-HD2 signal.

Broadcast translators for WRTP
Call sign	Frequency	City of license	FID	ERP (W)	HAAT	Class	Transmitter coordinates	FCC info
W256AH	99.1 FM	Durham, North Carolina	87712	250	104.3 m (342 ft)	D	36°6′29.5″N 78°56′23″W	LMS
W222AO	92.3 FM	South Goldsboro, North Carolina	157041	250	98.2 m (322 ft)	D	35°24′34″N 77°59′14″W	LMS
W216BN	91.1 FM	Raleigh, North Carolina	92570	10	121.9 m (400 ft)	D	35°45′5.5″N 78°36′0″W	LMS
W255AM	98.9 FM	Raleigh, North Carolina	87685	99	83.5 m (274 ft)	D	35°50′45.5″N 78°38′35″W	LMS
W274AK	102.7 FM	Wilson, North Carolina	87701	38	76.6 m (251 ft)	D	35°46′2.6″N 77°52′50.9″W	LMS

Broadcast translators for WRDU-HD2
Call sign	Frequency	City of license	FID	ERP (W)	HAAT	Class	Transmitter coordinates	FCC info
W299AP	107.7 FM	Apex, North Carolina	87711	250	0 m (0 ft)	D	35°42′51″N 78°49′3″W	LMS
W300CE	107.9 FM	Chapel Hill, North Carolina	87683	250	0 m (0 ft)	D	36°2′8.5″N 79°4′47″W	LMS
W254BV	98.7 FM	Clayton, North Carolina	87682	250	194.1 m (637 ft)	D	35°40′35.6″N 78°32′7″W	LMS
W243DA	96.5 FM	Greenville, North Carolina	87700	250	0 m (0 ft)	D	35°36′26″N 77°28′4″W	LMS
