= WTIK =

- Durham, North Carolina; United States
- Broadcast area: Durham; Chapel Hill; Raleigh
- Frequency: 1310 kHz
- Branding: La Ke Buena 1310

Programming
- Format: Regional Mexican

Ownership
- Owner: Claudino Bonerges, Ashley Padilla Ayala, Brian Padilla, and Alexis Padilla; (A&B Media LLC)

History
- First air date: July 4, 1946
- Former call signs: WDUK (1946–1950)
- Call sign meaning: "Where Tobacco Is King"

Technical information
- Licensing authority: FCC
- Facility ID: 53105
- Class: B
- Power: 5,000 watts day; 1,000 watts night
- Transmitter coordinates: 36°1′30.52″N 78°54′7.03″W

Links
- Public license information: Public file; LMS
- Website: www.kebuenanc.com

WTIK (1310 AM) is a radio station broadcasting a Regional Mexican format. Licensed to Durham, North Carolina, United States, the station serves the Triangle area. The station is owned by Claudino Bonerges, Ashley Padilla Ayala, Brian Padilla, and Alexis Padilla, through licensee A&B Media LLC.

== History ==
On June 10, 1946, under Harmon Duncan, Durham's second radio station, WDUK, began broadcasting at 1310 AM with 1,000 watts, and studios on Corcoran Street downtown, and its transmitter site on Leon Street in the Glendale Heights neighborhood. On July 4, 1946, James Floyd Fletcher, son of Capitol Broadcasting Company founder A.J. Fletcher, started the city's third radio station, WTIK, at 730 AM with studios downtown and an antenna on Ellis Road. In 1950, the stations merged and took the letters WTIK and the 1310 frequency.

In 1956, Fletcher and Duncan sold WTIK to the Welch family's W & W Broadcasting of Salisbury, North Carolina, as they had moved on to found Durham's first television station, WTVD, channel 11.

An ABC Radio affiliate, WTIK used several different formats including MOR, rock and roll, and later country, as one of the first stations in the state to embrace the format full-time.

In 1964, WTIK added a third tower and increased power to 5,000 watts. Also during that time, a vandal cut a guy wire, causing the tower to fall.

In 1969, Buddy Poole, who had worked for Harry Welch Sr. at WSAT in Salisbury, moved to WTIK, another of Welch's stations. Poole's autograph party with Loretta Lynn and Faron Young attracted 3000 people. Poole became general manager in 1972 at age 26 and remained at WTIK for four more years.

In the mid-to-late 1980s, WTIK was managed by Harry Welch, Jr.,-son of the W&W Broadcasting owner, Charles Welch, and veteran broadcaster Austin Rigsbee was Sales manager. Other employees included the long time morning show host Charlie "Country Boy" Cook who was on the air for more than 45 years when he retired, Program Director John Williford, who later left the station to work for WPCM (101.1 FM) in Burlington, North Carolina, under the name Jack Daniels. Robert “Bucky” Miller was a station DJ for years, who met numerous country stars during his tenure. WTIK was a full-time country music station with the positioning statement, "North Carolina's First in Country, WTIK".

In the fall of 1987, several short scenes for the movie Bull Durham were filmed in the WTIK broadcast studio. Producers reportedly had chosen the WTIK studio for the antiquated 1950s-era mixing board at that time still in use featuring knobs instead of more modern slider controls. The scenes feature actor Garland Bunting as a radio announcer broadcasting the Durham Bulls' away games.

In 1993, with increasing country music competition on the FM dial, WTIK switched to the satellite-delivered Sports Entertainment Network and became the Triangle's first sports station. W & W was in the process of selling the station when it signed off in late 1993, only to return a year later under the ownership of Baker Media with contemporary Christian music during the day and positive country music at night.

In 1997, "La Que Buena" (The Great One) added a second Spanish-language alternative to Durham radio. In 2004, "Mi Gente" (My People) became the first of two new names for WTIK; "La Rumba" followed in the summer of the same year. The station was owned by Blacksburg, Virginia-based Baker Communications until 2004, when the station was sold to Davidson Media Group.

In 2005, plans were announced for Spanish broadcaster Que Pasa to lease WTIK's air time for a contemporary Latin format to complement the regional Mexican moving from former sister station WDRU, 1030 AM, to WLLQ, WRTG and WGSB. In the summer of 2005, the contemporary format debuted as "Que Pasa Mixx". On April 1, 2006, WTIK's black gospel programming moved to new sister station, WRJD, 1410 AM, allowing WTIK to air 24-hour Spanish language programming.

On July 13, 2015, both WTIK and WRJD were sold to TBLC Media as part of a twelve-station deal with Davidson Media, which included stations in Charlotte, Greensboro, Richmond, Spartanburg, and Kansas City. The sale, at a purchase price of $3.5 million, was consummated on November 5, 2015.

From late 2011 until December 2014, WTIK was also heard in southeastern North Carolina via WZKB, 94.3 FM, in Wallace.

Effective May 6, 2021, TBLC Media sold WTIK and WRJD to Stuart Epperson's Truth Broadcasting Corporation for $200,000. Effective November 5, 2021, Truth Broadcasting sold WTIK to A&B Media LLC for $10,000.
