= WLLQ =

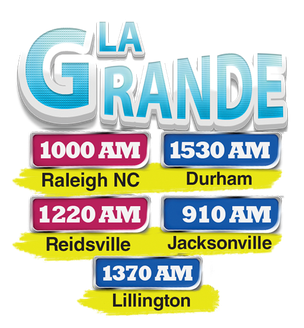
- Chapel Hill, North Carolina; United States
- Frequency: 1530 kHz
- Branding: La Grande

Programming
- Format: Regional Mexican

Ownership
- Owner: Estuardo Valdemar Rodriguez and Leonor Rodriguez
- Sister stations: WRTG, WREV, WSRP, WLLN

History
- First air date: 1973 (as WRBX)
- Former call signs: WRBX (1973–1986); WRTP (1986–2005)

Technical information
- Licensing authority: FCC
- Facility ID: 9068
- Class: D
- Power: 10,000 watts daytime only
- Transmitter coordinates: 35°58′7.52″N 79°0′9.04″W

Links
- Public license information: Public file; LMS
- Webcast: Listen live
- Website: lagrandenc.com

WLLQ is a daytime-only AM radio station licensed to Chapel Hill, North Carolina, on 1530 kHz. The station is part of the regional Mexican music network called La Grande.

== History ==
WLLQ debuted in 1973 as WRBX, a jazz-formatted station under the ownership of Stuart Epperson, later the head of national Christian broadcaster Salem Communications. WRBX's studios were located on Chapel Hill's West Rosemary Street, and the daytime-only station had 5,000 watts of power.

As the jazz format lost listeners to competitors on the FM dial, WRBX moved towards an inspirational Christian format. By 1978, WRBX had changed to a southern gospel format, increased its power to 10,000 watts and moved to studios on Durham-Chapel Hill Boulevard (US 15/501) near present-day New Hope Commons Shopping Center.

In 1979, Epperson sold WRBX to Hugh Johnston, who changed the station to a country format. The country format continued until 1985, when WRBX was sold to L. L. "Buddy" Leathers' Carolina Christian Communications, and the inspirational Christian format was reinstated. The station's studios were moved into Leathers' repair shop, and the call letters changed to WRTP.

The inspirational format soon became contemporary Christian. Carolina Christian Communications expanded WRTP to a simulcast with Garner-based WRTG, 1000 AM, in 1994 and to Mebane-based WGSB, 1060 AM in 1995. Between these three stations the full Triangle region was covered, but only during daylight hours, as all three were licensed only for daytime operation.

In October 2004, WRTP, WRTG and WGSB were all purchased by Estuardo Valdemar Rodriguez and Leonor Rodriguez, owners of WLLN in Lillington, for $1.1 million. On February 3, 2005, WRTP and its two sister AM stations ceased broadcasting the "His Radio WRTP" Christian format on AM, (Note: The original Christian format now airs over WRTP-FM, WCCE-FM, and a number of FM translators 24 hours a day throughout central and eastern North Carolina.) and after a day off-air, the three stations resumed broadcasting, now with a regional Mexican format formerly heard on WFTK. AM 1530 also changed its call letters from WRTP to WLLQ.

The La Grande network later added stations, while WGSB's license was cancelled by the Federal Communications Commission on March 12, 2019, due to the station having been silent since January 13, 2017.
