= WGSB =

WGSB may refer to:

- Welsh Government sponsored body
- Wilmington Grammar School for Boys
- Wirral Grammar School for Boys
- Watford Grammar School for Boys, more commonly abbreviated to WBGS
- WGSB (AM), a defunct radio station (1060 AM) formerly licensed to serve Mebane, North Carolina, United States
