= WRTG =

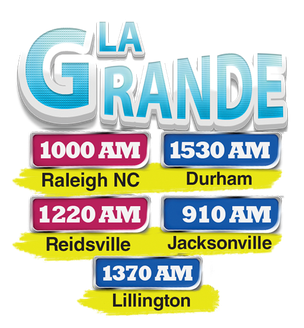
- Garner, North Carolina; United States
- Broadcast area: Research Triangle
- Frequency: 1000 kHz
- Branding: La Grande

Programming
- Format: Spanish variety

Ownership
- Owner: Estuardo Valdemar Rodriguez And Leonor Rodriguez
- Sister stations: WLLN, WLLQ, WREV, WSRP

History
- First air date: 1969
- Former call signs: WKBQ (1969–1987); WHEV (1987–1994)
- Call sign meaning: Research Triangle, Garner (disambiguation of WRTP, former calls of WLLQ)

Technical information
- Licensing authority: FCC
- Facility ID: 9072
- Class: D
- Power: 1,000 watts day
- Transmitter coordinates: 35°43′50.55″N 78°36′11.01″W

Links
- Public license information: Public file; LMS
- Webcast: Listen live
- Website: www.lagrandenc.com

WRTG (1000 AM) is a daytime-only radio station licensed to Garner, North Carolina, which also serves the Raleigh region. It airs a Spanish language format as part of the La Grande network.

== History ==
WRTG began in 1969 as country station WKBQ. In 1987, the station became classic country WHEV under the ownership of Henry E. Vail. After going silent in the early 1990s, Vail gave the license to Durham-based Carolina Christian Communications, which signed 1000 AM back on the air in 1994 as WRTG with a simulcast of contemporary Christian station WRTP, 1530 AM. A third AM signal, WGSB (1060 AM in Mebane, North Carolina) joined the simulcast in 1995. The stations were then known as "His Radio WRTP" and owned by Radio Training Network along with WRTP-FM in Roanoke Rapids and several FM translators across the Triangle and Eastern North Carolina.

In October 2004, WRTG, WRTP, and WGSB were all purchased by Estuardo Valdemar Rodriguez and Leonor Rodriguez, owners of WLLN in Lillington, North Carolina, for $1.1 million. On February 3, 2005, WRTG and its two sister AM stations ceased broadcasting the "His Radio WRTP" Christian format, and after a day off the air, the three stations resumed broadcasting a Spanish-language regional Mexican format formerly heard on WFTK. In November 2011, WRTG changed its format to "Radio La Grande".
