= WCCE =

Satellite of WRTP, Franklinton
- Buies Creek, North Carolina; United States
- Broadcast area: Fayetteville, North Carolina
- Frequency: 90.1 (MHz)
- Branding: His Radio WRTP

Programming
- Format: Christian radio

Ownership
- Owner: Radio Training Network

History
- First air date: October 7, 1974
- Call sign meaning: "We're Campbell for Christian Education" (former owner)

Technical information
- Licensing authority: FCC
- Facility ID: 8499
- Class: C3
- ERP: 15,000 watts
- HAAT: 92.1 meters (302 ft)
- Transmitter coordinates: 35°12′39.6″N 78°50′0.1″W

Links
- Public license information: Public file; LMS
- Website: www.hisradiowrtp.com

WCCE (90.1 FM; "His Radio") is a radio station broadcasting a contemporary Christian format. Licensed to Buies Creek, North Carolina, United States, the station serves the Fayetteville area. The station is owned by Radio Training Network and is a full-time satellite of WRTP in Franklinton.

== Geographic coverage ==
WCCE's 15,000 watt signal covers all of Harnett and Cumberland counties as well as parts of Wake, Lee, Johnston and Sampson counties.

== Former programming ==
The station had previously been the student radio station of Campbell University in Buies Creek. It formerly aired a format featuring easy listening music during parts of the broadcast day along with religious programming; during this period, WCCE was branded as "Light and Easy 90.1". This format was featured during the 1990s and early 2000s before being dropped in 2006 in favor of a Christian music format mixed with other religious programming. It also aired various athletic events of the Campbell Fighting Camels. Weekend programming included some bluegrass and big band music shows.

== Sale ==
Following the 2006–2007 school year, Campbell sold WCCE to Radio Training Network, which turned it into a full-power satellite of WRTP. The call letters remain unchanged, even though the new station operates from studios located in North Raleigh. RTN took over the station's operations under a local marketing agreement until the sale closed in 2007.

Soon after taking over the station, RTN won FCC approval to increase WCCE's power to 15,000 watts from a new tower in northeastern Cumberland County.
