= WGSB (AM) =

Radio station in Mebane, North Carolina, United States (1974–2017)

- Mebane, North Carolina; United States
- Frequency: 1060 kHz

Ownership
- Owner: Estuardo Valdemar Rodriguez and Leonor Rodriguez

History
- First air date: 1974
- Last air date: January 13, 2017
- Former call signs: WQWX (1973-1979); WHNI (1979-1985); WMYT (1985-1986); WGLH (1986-1990)
- Call sign meaning: Great Speckled Bird (gospel song)

Technical information
- Facility ID: 25036
- Class: D
- Power: 1,000 watts day; 500 watts critical hours
- Transmitter coordinates: 36°3′28.5″N 79°16′35.1″W

WGSB was an AM radio station licensed to Mebane, North Carolina and broadcasting on 1060 kHz. It began operation in 1974 as the first station licensed to Mebane, went off the air in 2017, and was deleted in 2019.

== History ==
WGSB debuted in March 1974, with the call letters WQWX, as the first station licensed to Mebane. For its entire existence the station was authorized for daytime-only operation on 1060 kHz with 1,000 watts and 500 watts during critical hours.

It was initially operated by Mebane-Hillsborough Broadcasting, Inc. At its start station management announced that WQWX would feature "popular songs of the day and popular album cuts", and would "serve the people of Alamance, Orange and Caswell counties with their own station". A subsequent change to rock music was reported to have been "a disaster", and in 1977 the station had switched to gospel music, as part of the Christian Impact Radio Network.

In 1979 the station was sold to Benchmark Communications, Ltd, headed by Roger D. Jennings, who changed the station's call letters to WHNI. In 1985 the station was acquired by the Twin Star Broadcasting Company, which changed the call sign to WMYT and implemented a rock music format. However, the station faced severe financial difficulties, and Twin Star was dissolved in bankruptcy, which caused the station to go off the air for ten months. WMYT resumed broadcasting in July 1986 with a Christian-gospel format, after being reacquired by Benchmark Communications, and the call sign was changed to WGLH. Three months later WGLH was acquired by Jim McManus, however within a few months the station once again fell silent, this time for an extended period.

Rev. James Lee Christopher, pastor of the People's Pilgrim Holiness Church, formed the Great Speckled Bird Broadcasting Co., Inc. (named after a traditional gospel tune) in order to revive the facility. The call letters were changed to WGSB, and the station returned to the air on July 8, 1990 with a non-commercial gospel format, operating from a wing in the church's education building.

In 1995 the station adopted a contemporary Christian format, joining WRTP, AM 1530 in Chapel Hill, and WRTG, AM 1000 in Garner. Between these three stations the full Triangle region was covered, but only during daylight hours, as all three were licensed only for daytime operation.

In 1996 the station was acquired for a third time by Roger Jennings and Benchmark Communications, for $4,000 in cash and a 10-year 10% promissory note for $125,000.

In October 2004, WRTP, WRTG and WGSB were all purchased by Estuardo Valdemar Rodriguez and Leonor Rodriguez, owners of WLLN in Lillington, for $1.1 million. On February 3, 2005, WGSB and its two sister AM stations ceased broadcasting the "His Radio WRTP" Christian format, and after a day off-air, the three stations resumed broadcasting, now with a regional Mexican format branded as "Que Pasa", formerly heard on WFTK.

The Spanish programing was later rebranded as the La Grande network, which later added other local stations. However, WGSB's license was cancelled by the Federal Communications Commission on March 12, 2019, due to the station having been silent since January 13, 2017.
