= WREV =

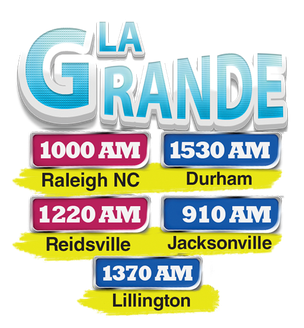
- Reidsville, North Carolina; United States
- Frequency: 1220 kHz

Programming
- Format: Spanish language

Ownership
- Owner: Estuardo Valdemar Rodriguez and Leonor Rodriguez

History
- First air date: 1948

Technical information
- Licensing authority: FCC
- Facility ID: 41442
- Class: D
- Power: 1,000 watts day
- Transmitter coordinates: 36°23′19″N 79°38′51″W
- Translator: (93.5 MHz) W228DS (Reidsville)

Links
- Public license information: Public file; LMS
- Website: www.lagrandenc.com

WREV (1220 AM), the format of which is known as La Grande, is a radio station in Reidsville, North Carolina, broadcasting music and news in Spanish. It is part of a five-station network.

== Station history ==
Prior to purchase by Que Pasa Media, WREV broadcast a country music format and aired several community-oriented talk shows. The call letters refer to the local newspaper, The Reidsville Review. WWMO, now WJMH, was co-owned with the station.
