= WLLN =

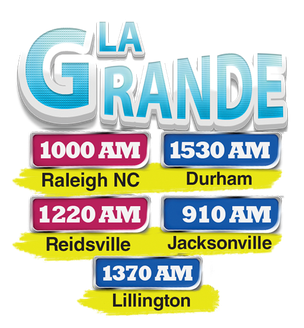
- Lillington, North Carolina; United States
- Broadcast area: Fayetteville, North Carolina
- Frequency: 1370 kHz
- Branding: La Grande

Programming
- Format: Spanish

Ownership
- Owner: Estuardo Valdemar Rodriguez

History
- First air date: February 12, 1979

Technical information
- Licensing authority: FCC
- Class: D
- Power: 5,000 watts day 49 watts night
- Transmitter coordinates: 35°23′16″N 78°48′22″W
- Translator: (92.7 MHz) W224DO (Lillington)

Links
- Public license information: Public file; LMS
- Website: www.lagrandenc.com

WLLN (1370 AM) is a radio station broadcasting a Spanish language format. Licensed to Lillington, North Carolina, United States, it serves the Fayetteville area. The station is currently owned by Estuardo Valdemar Rodriguez.

== History ==
Bob Etheridge owned WLLN when it signed on Monday, February 12, 1979 at 11:00 AM with "Music Box Dancer" by Frank Mills as the only radio station in Lillington. The station operated a two-tower directional antenna array with 2500 watts of daytime power and 500 watts pre-sunrise authority. The station manager of WLLN was Cary Stedman, who was assisted by his father-in-law, Lincoln Faulk, who had been the first station manager of WCKB in Dunn in 1946. The station played adult contemporary music until August 4, 1980, when the station changed format to country music. The new station manager was Charles Fowler, who had been a top salesman of commercial advertising at WPYB in Benson. Fowler brought with him the Good Morning Charlie Show. This was a buy-and-sell show, somewhat like a swap shop program. In the middle of this country music format, WLLN added in the summer of 1984 a Beach Music Program on the third Friday of each month. It was hosted by Selby Davis, who had done this program at WQTI in Dunn. It was entitled "At the Beach". In 1984, the station increased power to 5000 watts with a three-tower directional antenna array. On March 18, 1985, the station changed format to (top 40 music) with a heavy emphasis on music of the 50s, 60s, and 70s. On the weekends, gospel music could be heard on Sundays from sign-on to noon. Fowler left WLLN in October 1987 to purchase WCKB in Dunn, which he owns as of this writing in May 2010. There have been many air personalities at WLLN, some of which were: Dr. Anthony Harrington, Cary Stedman, Mike Dennis, Steve Norris, Abby Norris, Clay McCauley, Frankie Bellflower, Danny Phair, Gail Brown, Lottie Squires, Bill Sellers (who was also known as "Wagon Wheel Willie" on AFN Radio Korea), Kim Carpenter, Sherri James, Bill Blalock, Bob Klug, Lisa Herne, Gibson Smith, Hank Cox, Kevin Johnson, Richard Longnecker, Lana Gardner, Dot Hood, Marc Parker, Larry Rickard and Mike Coats. Butch Halpin brought Beach Music back to WLLN in August 1989 with The Carolina Sounds Beach Show. That show was on WLLN for 18 months until it moved to another radio station. Al Anders handled Sunday morning gospel, as he had done at WCKB. In 1988, WLLN did a collaborative broadcast with WBLA in Elizabethtown and WBZB in Selma. This continued until WLLN was sold in 1991.

Etheridge admitted he never made a lot of money with the station, but he felt it provided a service to the citizens of central Harnett County and to the county seat of Lillington. In 1991, he sold WLLN to Christian Purities Fellowship, Inc., which was owned by O.T. Spence, who also was the President of Heritage Bible College in Dunn, NC. Spence later sold the station to Rodriguez, who came to the United States in 1961 and also owned a radio station in his native Peru.

In October 1999, WLLN became Radio La Grande, which was one of three Spanish-language radio stations in North Carolina in July 2000. In addition to Harnett County, the 5000-watt station covered Lee, Johnston and Sampson Counties and part of Cumberland. Music included salsa, bachata, cumbia and Tejano music. Programming also included news, information and sports. Program director Teo Rodriguez had also hosted shows on WFSS and WFAI.
