= KWND =

Radio station in Springfield, Missouri

Coordinates: 37.175°N 93.043°W

- Springfield, Missouri; United States
- Broadcast area: Springfield, Missouri Metropolitan Area
- Frequency: 88.3 MHz (HD Radio)
- Branding: The Wind

Programming
- Format: Christian adult contemporary; Contemporary Christian
- Subchannels: HD2: Joy FM Worship (Christian worship); HD3: LF Radio (Christian hip hop)

Ownership
- Owner: Radio Training Network, Inc.
- Sister stations: KWFC; WAFJ; WJIS; WLFJ-FM; WVFJ-FM

History
- First air date: July 12, 1993 (32 years ago)

Technical information
- Licensing authority: FCC
- Facility ID: 51636
- Class: C1
- ERP: 35,000 watts horizontal; 34,900 watts vertical
- HAAT: 193 meters (633 ft)

Links
- Public license information: Public file; LMS
- Webcast: Listen Live
- Website: thewind.radio

KWND (88.3 FM, "The Wind") is a radio station broadcasting in Springfield, Missouri, United States, with a contemporary Christian music format. KWND is owned/operated by the not-for-profit Radio Training Network, which also operates stations in Missouri, North Carolina, South Carolina, Georgia, Alabama, and Florida.

== History ==
KWND began broadcasting on July 12, 1993 from its studios at 2550 S. Campbell Avenue in Springfield, Missouri. Originally owned by Parkcrest Assembly of God, the station was purchased in 1995 by the Radio Training Network.

KWND began broadcasting in HD radio on January 28, 2020, on 88.3-1 FM. LF Radio was added to 88.3-2 FM on February 3, 2020.

== Translators ==
KWND programming is also broadcast on the following repeater/translator/booster stations:

- KCKJ, 89.5-FM in Sarcoxie, MO, since 2018
- K265DR, 100.9-FM in Bolivar, MO, since 2004
- K271CC, 102.1-FM in Mountain Grove, MO, since 2016

== Industry ==
KWND is a monitored reporting station to the Christian AC charts of Billboard magazine.
