= KCKJ =

Radio station in Sarcoxie, Missouri

- Sarcoxie, Missouri; United States
- Broadcast area: Joplin, Missouri
- Frequency: 89.5 MHz
- Branding: The Wind

Programming
- Format: Christian Contemporary Music
- Affiliations: KWND

Ownership
- Owner: Radio Training Network, Inc.
- Sister stations: KWND; KWFC; WAFJ; WJIS; WLFJ-FM; WVFJ-FM

History
- Former call signs: KITG (2008–2012)

Technical information
- Licensing authority: FCC
- Facility ID: 175649
- Class: C2
- ERP: 50,000 watts
- HAAT: 107 meters (351 ft)
- Transmitter coordinates: 37°11′40″N 93°55′40″W

Links
- Public license information: Public file; LMS
- Webcast: Listen Now
- Website: TheWind.radio

KCKJ (89.5 FM The Wind) is a Christian radio station licensed to Sarcoxie, Missouri, United States, serving the Joplin, Missouri area. The station is an affiliate of KWND broadcasting a Christian Contemporary Music format, and is currently owned by Radio Training Network, Inc.

== History ==
The station began broadcasting in August 2009, and initially held the call letters KITG. KITG was owned by Calvary Chapel Joplin until May 8, 2012, and aired a format consisting of Christian talk and teaching and Christian music. The station adopted the call letters KCKJ on May 18, 2012. Effective August 23, 2018, the station was sold by Lake Area Educational Broadcasting Foundation to Radio Training Network, Inc., as a purchase price of $135,000

== See also ==
- List of radio stations in Missouri
