= WSCF =

WSCF may refer to:

- WSCF-FM, a radio station (91.9 FM) licensed to Vero Beach, Florida, United States
- WSCF-LD, a low-power television station (channel 31, virtual 30) licensed to Melbourne, Florida, United States
- WNUE-FM, a radio station (98.1 FM) licensed to Deltona, Florida, United States, which held the call sign WSCF from 1986 to 1989
- WWRZ, a radio station (98.3 FM) licensed to Fort Meade, Florida, United States, which held the call sign WSCF in 1990
- World Student Christian Federation, a federation of Student Christian Movements
- World Strongman Cup Federation, a strength athletics body
