= WLFA =

Coordinates: 35.601°N 82.652°W

Asheville, North Carolina; United States
- Frequency: 91.3 MHz (HD Radio)
- Branding: HIS radio 91.3

Programming
- Format: Contemporary Christian Music
- Subchannels: HD2: His Radio Z (Christian CHR); HD3: His Radio Praise (Contemporary worship music)

Ownership
- Owner: Radio Training Network, Inc.
- Sister stations: WRTP, WLFJ-FM and WLFS

History
- First air date: December 16, 1975 (first license granted)
- Call sign meaning: With Love For Ashville

Technical information
- Licensing authority: FCC
- Facility ID: 2922
- Class: A
- ERP: 440 watts
- HAAT: 262 meters (860 ft)
- Translators: (92.1 MHz) W221ET (Asheville); 99.5 W258CA (West Asheville)

Links
- Public license information: Public file; LMS
- Webcast: Listen Live
- Website: www.hisradio.com/home/asheville/

WLFA (91.3 FM) is a radio station broadcasting a contemporary Christian music format to Asheville, North Carolina and the surrounding area. The station is currently owned by Radio Training Network, Inc. and is part of its "His Radio" network. The station mostly simulcasts programming from flagship WLFJ-FM in Greenville, South Carolina; which operates translators in nearby Hendersonville, Weaverville and Black Mountain.

Programming includes music by such artists as MercyMe, Michael W. Smith, Point of Grace, Steven Curtis Chapman, Jeremy Camp, Avalon, Toby Mac, and Mark Schultz, as well as family ministries such as those of Dr. James Dobson and Charles Stanley.

== History ==
Jim Robinson started WBMU ("Where Black Means Unity") on April 7, 1975 as Asheville's first nonprofit radio station, primarily serving an African-American audience. Programming included jazz, reggae, funk and talk. As of November 1987 it had been off the air for six months, with plans to sell to minister Kenneth Brantley, who planned talk programming.

In January 1988 the station returned to the air as Contemporary Christian WKDB but was not successful. A switch to black gospel music in June, with artists such as James Cleveland and Mighty Clouds of Joy appeared likely to improve the station's popularity, though the signal needed improving and stereo broadcasting was planned. A call-in talk show was added in August, airing six nights a week.

On September 1, 1992, WLFJ-FM, which obtained the broadcast rights to WKDB, began programming the station with the new letters WLFA.
