= WOLI =

WOLI may refer to:

- WOLI (AM), a radio station (910 AM) licensed to Spartanburg, South Carolina, United States
- WSHP-FM, a radio station (103.9 FM) licensed to Easley, South Carolina, which held the call sign WOLI or WOLI-FM from 1996 to 2015
