= WAHP =

WAHP may refer to:

- WAHP (FM), a radio station (88.5 FM) licensed to serve Due West, South Carolina, United States
- WHRT-FM, a radio station (91.9 FM) licensed to serve Cokebury, South Carolina, which held the call sign WAHP from 2014 to 2019
- An abbreviation for work at home parent.
