= WMUU =

WMUU may refer to:

- WMUU-LP, a radio station (102.9 FM) licensed to serve Madison, Wisconsin
- WPJF, a radio station (1260 AM) licensed to serve Greenville, South Carolina, United States, which held the call sign WMUU until 2008
- WKVG (FM), a radio station (94.5 FM) licensed to serve Greenville, South Carolina, which held the call sign WMUU-FM until 2013
