= WALC =

Christian radio station in Charleston, South Carolina

WALC and WZLC

WALC: Charleston, South Carolina; WZLC: Summerville, South Carolina
- Broadcast area: South Carolina Lowcountry
- Frequencies: WALC: 100.5 MHz (HD Radio); WZLC: 88.9 MHz
- Branding: HIS Radio 88.9 / 100.5

Programming
- Format: Christian Contemporary music

Ownership
- Owner: Radio Training Network
- Sister stations: WLFJ-FM, WRAF (FM), WRFJ, WRTP

History
- First air date: WALC: April 4, 1990; WZLC: June 2011
- Former call signs: WALC: WSUY (1990–1997); WZLC: WKBR (2011–2014)
- Call sign meaning: WALC: Former "Alice" branding

Technical information
- Licensing authority: FCC
- Facility ID: WALC: 72377; WZLC: 173901
- Class: WALC: C3; WZLC: C1
- ERP: WALC: 13,500 watts; WZLC: 70,000 watts (horizontal); 54,200 watts (vertical)
- HAAT: WALC: 136.6 meters (448 ft); WZLC: 96 meters (315 ft)
- Transmitter coordinates: WALC: 32°49′1″N 79°50′9″W; WZLC: 33°11′33.6″N 80°33′50.4″W
- Translator(s): WALC: 91.1 W216BJ (Wando)

Links
- Public license information: WALC: Public file; LMS; WZLC: Public file; LMS
- Webcast: Listen live
- Website: hisradio.com/home/charleston/

WALC (100.5 FM) and WZLC (88.9 FM) are non-commercial, listener-supported radio stations serving the Charleston metropolitan area and South Carolina Lowcountry. WALC is licensed to Charleston and WZLC is licensed to Summerville. They are owned by the Radio Training Network (RTN) and carry a Christian radio format known as HIS Radio 88.9 and 100.5.

WALC's transmitter is located in Mount Pleasant, while WZLC's is located in St. George. WALC is also relayed over low-power FM translator W261BJ (91.1 FM), licensed to Wando.

== History ==
=== WALC ===
WALC took to the air on April 4, 1990, as WSUY, with a soft adult contemporary format as "Sunny 100.5". This lasted until late 1997 when the station was purchased by Jacor Communications and was added to its Charleston cluster. Those stations were later absorbed by San Antonio-based Clear Channel Communications, a forerunner to today's iHeartMedia, Inc. Clear Channel shifted the station toward Modern AC as "Alice @ 100.5" using the call sign WLLC.

By Spring 1998, Alice was becoming a popular station in Charleston with its "Lilith Fair-type programming", though program director Todd Haller admitted a lot of people still did not know about the station. Less than a year later, the call letters switched to WALC to match its Alice moniker.

By 2001, the station had shifted toward more of a traditional Hot Adult Contemporary sound. In 2004, the station flipped to an Adult Album Alternative format as "100.5 The Drive", later transitioning to Alternative rock after the flip of WAVF to adult hits.

In 2006, WALC was placed in Clear Channel Communications' Aloha Station Trust, LLC, a group of stations to be spun off due to FCC regulations. On November 26, 2008, Clear Channel announced that the station had been sold to the Radio Training Network. RTN is a non-profit organization based in Port Richey, Florida, which operates Christian stations, mostly in the American South. The company also owns WLFJ-FM in Greenville, South Carolina, and WAFJ-FM in Augusta, Georgia.

WALC switched to a Contemporary Christian music format on January 26, 2009. The Alternative rock format previously heard on 100.5 is now heard on WRFQ's HD Radio subchannel. Previously, "His Radio" was only able to be heard in the Charleston area on two translators, at 91.1 and 91.9 FM. These are now translators relaying WHRZ from Spartanburg, South Carolina.

=== WZLC ===
This station began broadcasting in June 2011 as WKBR. WKBR, along with WKRI Cokesbury, South Carolina, and WFBK Fort Mill, South Carolina, were sold by Spirit Broadcasting Group Inc. for $460,832.

All three stations were acquired by the Radio Training Network. WKBR changed its call letters to WZLC on September 11, 2014. WZLC became a full-time simulcast of WALC.

== Programming ==
Most of the day, WALC and WZLC play Christian Contemporary music. A few hours a day, they air Christian talk and teaching programs such as Focus on the Family, Turning Point with Dr. David Jeremiah and In Touch with Charles Stanley.

WALC and WZLC are part of a network of HIS Radio stations in South Carolina, North Carolina and Georgia. RTN also owns Christian stations known as "Joy FM," "His Radio Talk," "His Radio Praise" and "His Radio Z."
