= KJFT =

KJFT may refer to:

- KJFT (FM), a radio station (90.3 FM) licensed to Arlee, Montana, United States
- KJTM-LP, a low-power radio station (93.7 FM) licensed to Lincoln, Nebraska, United States, which held the call sign KJFT-LP from 2005 to 2022
