= WRAF (FM) =

Christian radio station in Toccoa Falls, Georgia

- Toccoa Falls, Georgia; United States
- Broadcast area: Athens, Georgia; Northeast Georgia
- Frequency: 90.9 MHz
- Branding: HIS radio 90.9

Programming
- Format: Christian radio
- Affiliations: Salem Communications, HIS Radio

Ownership
- Owner: Radio Training Network, Inc.

Technical information
- Licensing authority: FCC
- Facility ID: 67213
- Class: C1
- ERP: 100,000 watts
- HAAT: 172.0 meters (564.3 ft)
- Transmitter coordinates: 34°35′57.00″N 83°21′55.00″W

Links
- Public license information: Public file; LMS
- Webcast: Listen Live
- Website: www.hisradio.com/home/athens/

WRAF (90.9 FM) is a Christian radio station owned and operated by Radio Training Network, Inc. It is licensed to Toccoa Falls, Georgia and serves the Athens metropolitan area along with much of Northeast Georgia. It features a Christian adult contemporary music format. Three family ministries are also included in the weekday schedule: James Dobson, David Jeremiah and Charles Stanley .It features news from Salem Communications.

== History ==
Its sister and companion station was WTXR.

The station, along with WEPC (now WAHP), WPFJ, WTXR, and translators W221AZ and W265AZ, was purchased from Toccoa Falls College effective July 25, 2016 for $2.1 million.

== Translators and simulcasts ==
The station relays its signal through various other radio stations and translators to broaden its coverage range:

Call sign	Frequency	City of license	FID	FCC info
W221AZ	(92.1 FM) FM	Toccoa, GA		
