= WYOR =

WYOR may refer to:

- WYOR (FM), a radio station (88.5 FM) licensed to serve Republic, Ohio, United States
- WGFJ, a radio station (94.1 FM) licensed to serve Cross Hill, South Carolina, United States, which held the call sign WYOR from 2007 to 2010
