= WLFS =

Radio station in Port Wentworth, Georgia

Coordinates: 32.158°N 80.992°W

- Port Wentworth, Georgia; United States
- Broadcast area: Savannah, Georgia; Hilton Head, South Carolina
- Frequency: 91.9 MHz (HD Radio)
- Branding: His Radio 91.9 and 88.9

Programming
- Format: religious radio, Christian adult contemporary music
- Subchannels: HD2: His Radio Z (Christian CHR, semi-satellite of WHRZ-LP); HD3: His Radio Praise (All worship music)

Ownership
- Owner: Radio Training Network
- Sister stations: WALC, WLFJ-FM, WRTP

Technical information
- Licensing authority: FCC
- Facility ID: 85801
- Class: C3
- ERP: 23,500 watts horiz 23,000 watts vert
- HAAT: 103.1 meters (338 ft)
- Repeater: 88.9 WLFH (Claxton)

Links
- Public license information: Public file; LMS
- Webcast: Listen Live
- Website: www.hisradio.com/home/savannah/

WLFS (91.9 FM) is a Christian radio station broadcasting a Christian adult contemporary music format. Licensed to Port Wentworth, Georgia, United States, it serves the Savannah and Hilton Head areas. The station is currently owned by Radio Training Network.

== Subchannels ==
The station broadcasts the following HD Radio subchannels:

Channel	Callsign	Name	Programming
91.9FM	WLFS-HD	His Radio	Christian adult contemporary music
91.9-2FM	WLFS-HD2	His Radio Z	Christian CHR, semi-satellite of WHRZ-LP
91.9-3FM	WLFS-HD3	His Radio Praise	All worship music
