= WBIJ =

WBIJ may refer to:

- WBIJ (FM), a radio station (88.7 FM) licensed to serve Saluda, South Carolina, United States
- WMOW, a television station (channel 12, virtual 4) licensed to serve Crandon, Wisconsin, United States, which held the call sign WBIJ from 1998 to 2010
