= WSHP-FM =

Radio station in Easley, North Carolina

- Easley, South Carolina; United States
- Broadcast area: Upstate South Carolina
- Frequency: 103.9 MHz
- Branding: His Radio Praise

Programming
- Format: Contemporary worship music

Ownership
- Owner: Radio Training Network
- Sister stations: WHRT-FM, WRTP, WALC, WLFS, WLFJ-FM

History
- First air date: 1964 (as WELP-FM)
- Former call signs: WELP-FM (1964–1985); WTLT-FM (1985-1987); WLWZ (1987–1992); WLWZ-FM (1992–1996); WOLI (1996–2005); WOLI-FM (2005–2015); WTOB (2015–2016); WTOB-FM (2016–2020)
- Call sign meaning: "His Radio Praise" (station branding) or "worship", the style of music played

Technical information
- Licensing authority: FCC
- Facility ID: 73239
- Class: C3
- ERP: 25,000 watts
- HAAT: 100 meters (330 ft)
- Transmitter coordinates: 34°50′21″N 82°31′37″W
- Repeaters: 88.5 WAHP (Due West); (89.3 WLFJ-FM HD3) Greenville ({{{3}}})

Links
- Public license information: Public file; LMS
- Webcast: Listen Live
- Website: hisradiopraise.com

WSHP-FM (103.9 MHz, "His Radio Praise") is an FM radio station licensed to Easley, South Carolina and serving the Greenville radio market. Owned by Radio Training Network, it broadcasts a contemporary worship music radio format.

== History ==
The station signed on in 1964 as WELP-FM, which mostly simulcast its sister station, WELP (1360 AM). By the early 1980s, WELP-FM's tower was moved to a new location and the station's power was increased from 2.3 kW to 3 kW in order to get a better signal into nearby Greenville. The station at the time was known as WTLT "Lite 104", airing a soft adult contemporary format.

Both WTLT and WELP-FM were sold to new ownership by 1987. In December of that year, WTLT changed to urban contemporary as WLWZ, adopting the "Z-104" nickname. After two months of cold segues and promos, a new airstaff debuted in February 1988, consisting of Greg Darden (from KRNB in Memphis, Tennessee) for mornings, Maxx Myrick (from WCIN in Cincinnati, Ohio) for middays as well as programming duties, Dave Hendricks (a holdover from the station's previous format) for afternoons, Tori Turner (also from WCIN) for nights as well as the station's music director, and "Brother" Bill Prater (from WJKC in Christiansted, U.S. Virgin Islands) for overnights. Ratings increased almost overnight from a 1.1 to a 9.4, despite having a limited signal that covered half of the Greenville-Spartanburg radio market.

In 1989, the Voyager broadcasting group purchased the radio station, and utilized Don Kelly & JC Floyd as consultants. Wayne Walker (from WFXC in Raleigh-Durham, North Carolina and WHYZ in Greenville, South Carolina, was brought in as program director and operations manager, and the station was renamed "Music Power Z-104". The successful lineup for a number of years included "Smooth Talker" Wayne Walker & Vince Davis on the Z-104 Wake-Up Patrol, also Rocky Valentine, Al Sullystone, Janice Henderson and Action Jackson.

In January 1993, WLWZ added a simulcast partner as 103.3 FM from nearby Greer signed on, becoming WLYZ, which helped the station to be heard in the Spartanburg part of the market. By that time, both stations were billed as "Double Z", but continued with the urban format. This made the station receivable along Interstate 85 almost from the North Carolina to Georgia line on both 103s.

Emerald City Broadcasting purchased WWMM (107.3 FM) in 1994 and added an urban format which became a direct competitor. WWMM was relaunched as WJMZ "107.3 Jamz". Emerald City purchased Double Z in 1994, and began programming Double Z with an urban AC/oldies format in order to better co-exist with 107.3. Eventually the Double Z 103 simulcast became alternative rock "103-X" with 103.3 picking up the WXWZ call sign and 103.9 picking up the WXWX call sign in early 1995. All the Double Z urban staff was fired with the exception of Action Jackson and Wayne Walker who did a short stint as midday personality on WJMZ until March 1995. Action Jackson continued to do weekends and fill-ins on WJMZ until March 1996. WXWX and WXWZ were the first alternative rock stations in the market, but the same signal problems that the stations had remained, even with the addition of 103.3.

On January 1, 1996, 103-X added Howard Stern's radio show for mornings, but was faced with a backlash from both radio listeners and advertisers that lasted for weeks. During that time, Emerald City decided to sell to Sinclair Broadcast Group, and 103-X changed formats to oldies in February 1996 after the flip of WFBC-FM to top-40. The call letters WOLI (103.9) and WOLT (103.3) were added a few months later. The stations aired a format delivered via satellite for the next few years and in late 1999, a local airstaff was finally added.

In November 2000, the station jumped on the 1980s oldies bandwagon that was going on at the time, becoming "Star 103", but retained the call letters for both stations. The syndicated Bob and Sheri radio show was added as well as a new airstaff. Over time, the station slowly evolved toward classic hits, but kept the Star 103 handle. In late 2003, the station changed its format to a contemporary Christian/country hybrid as "The Walk".

In 2005, Entercom sold WOLT, WOLI, and WSPA (910 AM) to Davidson Media Group, while retaining "The Walk" and placing it on its newly acquired 106.3 WGVC signal. After Davidson took ownership, WOLI-FM flipped to a Regional Mexican format simulcast with WOLI (910 AM) starting in October 2005. The 910 simulcast was intended to better cover Spartanburg with the programming heard on 103.9, which primarily covers the Greenville area. However, when WNOW-FM, then located in Gaffney, South Carolina began airing much of the same programming in 2007, WOLI-FM began playing Spanish religious programming.

Davidson Media sold WOLI-FM and eleven other stations to Mahan Janbakhsh's TBLC Holdings, LLC for $3.5 million; following the closure of the sale in November 2015, it flipped to Regional Mexican as Activa 103.9. Its calls were later changed to WTOB, and then WTOB-FM.

In September 2019, the station was sold to Radio Training Network, which would make it a sister station to WLFJ-FM; the sale was consummated on March 11, 2020. On March 19, 2020, following the closure of the sale, the station flipped to contemporary worship music as His Radio Praise, and changed its call letters to WSHP-FM. Also in 2020, the station upgraded the signal to become a 25,000 watt Class C3 and began broadcasting in HD Radio. Even with the power boost, it only provides secondary coverage of parts of the eastern Upstate, including Spartanburg.
