= WCFJ (FM) =

Coordinates: 34.082°N 81.126°W

- Irmo, South Carolina; United States
- Broadcast area: Columbia, South Carolina
- Frequency: 92.1 MHz (HD Radio)
- Branding: His Radio

Programming
- Format: Christian radio

Ownership
- Owner: Radio Training Network

History
- First air date: 1985 (as WJRQ)
- Former call signs: WSBP (1985–1987); WJRQ (1987–1996); WJES-FM (1996–2004); WWNU (2004–2016)

Technical information
- Licensing authority: FCC
- Facility ID: 17765
- Class: C3
- ERP: 15,000 watts
- HAAT: 130.3 meters (427 ft)

Links
- Public license information: Public file; LMS
- Webcast: Listen live
- Website: www.hisradio.com/home/columbia/

WCFJ (92.1 MHz) is a Christian FM radio station affiliated with His Radio and licensed to Irmo, South Carolina, and serves the Columbia, South Carolina, market. The Radio Training Network outlet is licensed by the Federal Communications Commission (FCC) to broadcast with an effective radiated power (ERP) of 15 kW. Its studios and transmitter are located in Columbia separately.

== History ==
The 92.1 frequency originally signed on in late 1985 as WJRQ in Saluda, South Carolina, featuring a middle of the road format. The station eventually became WJES-FM in 1996 as a simulcast partner with oldies-formatted 92.7 WKSX-FM Johnston, South Carolina. The station became known as "The Twins". The WJES call letters stood for Johnston, Edgefield, and Saluda, the towns that the station broadcast to.

In 2003, Saluda County (where WJES-FM was located) became part of the Columbia market, which paved the way for the station to be moved in. In 2004, the simulcast with WKSX-FM was dropped in preparation for the move. WJES-FM's license was changed to Irmo and the station increased its power to the present 15 kW with a country music format adopted under the WWNU call sign, and the name "New 92.1".

Owner Double O Radio intended for WWNU and WWNQ to compete with WCOS-FM, but the stations did not succeed. WWNU tried hiring former WCOS-FM DJ Jeff Roper in 2005. In 2009, WWNU had to fire Tyler & Ken for controversial behavior, and another former WCOS-FM jock, Charlie James, replaced them. Finally, Tim Miller of WACH became general manager in 2010.

On July 30, 2010, WWNU changed their format to gold-based soft adult contemporary, branded as "Carolina 92.1". The station primarily played soft pop music from the 1960s through the 1990s. However, due to a series of airstaff changes, the station never took off.

"Good Morning Columbia" with Doug Enlow, Bill Benton and Charlie Benton moved from WISW in April 2012.

Hometown Radio bought WWNU and WWNQ in 2012. On June 29, 2012, at 5 p.m., after playing "What Might Have Been" by Little Texas, WWNU flipped to adult album alternative as "92.1 The Palm", with the first song being "Ho Hey" by the Lumineers, followed by "Friday I'm in Love" by The Cure. Mike Allen moved from WCOO in Charleston, South Carolina, to serve as music director and morning host. "Good Morning Columbia" moved to WWNQ effective July 5. WWNU was a Carolina Panthers affiliate.

On March 31, 2016, Hometown Columbia owner Thomas Davis transferred WWNU's license to Hometown Columbia's parent company, Davis Media, LLC. On August 2, 2016, Radio Training Network completed its purchase of WWNU from Davis Media and switched the format to its contemporary Christian network, His Radio. On August 4, 2016, WWNU changed its callsign to WCFJ.
