= KITG =

KITG may refer to:

- KCTI-FM, a radio station (88.1 FM) licensed to serve Gonzales, Texas, United States, which held the call sign KITG from 2015 to 2016
- KCKJ, a radio station (89.5 FM) licensed to serve Sarcoxie, Missouri, United States, which held the call sign KITG from 2008 to 2012
