= KWFC =

Radio station in Springfield, Missouri

- Springfield, Missouri; United States
- Broadcast area: Springfield MO area
- Frequency: 89.1 MHz
- Branding: 89.1 KWFC

Programming
- Format: Southern Gospel

Ownership
- Owner: Radio Training Network, Inc.
- Sister stations: KWND; WJIS; WLFJ-FM; WVFJ-FM

History
- First air date: 1969
- Call sign meaning: Keep Witnessing For Christ

Technical information
- Licensing authority: FCC
- Facility ID: 3681
- Class: C
- ERP: 100,000 watts
- HAAT: 342.0 meters
- Transmitter coordinates: 37°12′6.00″N 92°56′33.00″W
- Translators: (94.1 MHz) K231CI (Branson) (103.3 MHz) K277AM (Mansfield)

Links
- Public license information: Public file; LMS
- Webcast: Listen live
- Website: www.kwfc.org

KWFC (89.1 FM) is a radio station broadcasting a Southern Gospel format. Licensed to Springfield, Missouri, United States, the station serves the Springfield MO area. The station is owned by the Radio Training Network, Inc.

== History ==
KWFC began broadcasting on April 17, 1969 at 97.3-FM in Springfield. At the time, the commercial station operated for most of the day, but would shut down for the night. Those early days saw a programming mix of teaching, preaching and music. The musical format was not strictly southern gospel as it is today, primarily because the genre didn't have that designation nationally.

Instead, according to a 1970 Billboard magazine article, the station aired a mix of gospel, contemporary and easy listening Christian music. That musical format would stay with the station until the 1980s when the Christian music genre diverged into better defined subgenres (southern gospel, inspirational, contemporary Christian). At that time, KWFC became primarily southern gospel.

KWFC moved into the W.F. "Bill" Askew Broadcast Center in 1979. The original transmitter facility was also located on the BBC campus on a 400-foot tower. In 1985, Baptist Bible College sold the 97.3 MHz frequency to Demaree Media, which then founded KXUS. At that time, KWFC moved to 89.1-FM and began operations as a non-commercial educational station. In 1998, KWFC and BBC purchased a 1,000 foot tower (formerly used by KSPR) at Fordland, and relocated to that location.

At around that same time, KWFC began expanding into another technology, the Internet. In 1998, KWFC.org was launched to meet the growing demand to get information out to the world. KWFC would begin streaming its signal over the Internet in 2006.

In January 2015, Baptist Bible College, Inc., sold KWFC to the Radio Training Network. The sale closed on January 30, 2015, at a price of $1,301,000. KWFC's studios were moved to 2550 S. Campbell Ave in Springfield where they continue to operate to this date.

== Early leadership ==
KWFC's beginnings spawned from radio piracy when a young Jim Price began tinkering in radio as a teenager. He built a pirate radio station in his parents' garage. Not long after that, he found legitimate work as a DJ and engineer at a station in Detroit.

As he got older, he moved to Springfield, Missouri, to attend Baptist Bible College. While a student at BBC, he convinced school leaders to begin building a Christian radio station on the campus. As the project moved along, BBC administrators hired Rev. Bill Askew.

Jim would become KWFC's first Program Director, a title he held until he left the station in the late 1970s. In 1979, he helped found Sterling Communications in Ringgold, Georgia. He spent the rest of his life helping others fulfill their dreams of building radio stations across the country. Jim died in 2011.

Rev. Askew began his radio career in the U.S. Marine Corps where he was a radio man serving in the Pacific theater in World War II. Following the war, he began working in commercial radio. Technology at that time required the use of engineers constantly at the station or any outside broadcast. While working for a station in Florida, Bill was assigned to be the engineer for a live broadcast from a local church. At the end of one of these services, Bill went forward to accept Jesus into his life. This would forever change the course of his life.

Over the years, Bill would work in radio and become a pastor in Florida. In 1968, he was hired by BBC to become KWFC's first General Manager. He and Jim Price worked together to make KWFC a reality.

Bill Askew would spend two stints as the station's manager. These two terms allowed him to lead the growth in the early days of KWFC, the new beginning in 1985 when KWFC moved to 89.1-FM, and the transmitter move to Fordland in 1998. He served KWFC until his death in September 2000.

== Awards ==
In September 2008, KWFC DJs Gary Longstaff and Dave Taylor won the Singing News Golden Mic award.

In March 2010, Program Director Kyle Dowden won the Singing News Golden Mic award.

In September 2013, KWFC was awarded Radio Station of the Year by the Southern Gospel Music Guild during the NQC Music Awards.

In February 2015, Dave Taylor won the Singing News Golden Mic award for a second time.
