= WHRT =

WHRT may refer to:

- WHRT-FM, a radio station (91.9 FM) licensed to serve Cokesbury, South Carolina, United States
- WHRT-LP, a defunct low-power television station (channel 17) formerly licensed to serve Sebring, etc., Florida, United States
