= WGFJ =

- Cross Hill, South Carolina; United States
- Broadcast area: Lakelands
- Frequency: 105.1 MHz
- Branding: His Radio

Programming
- Format: Christian radio

Ownership
- Owner: Radio Training Network

History
- First air date: July 17, 1998
- Former call signs: WBDQ (1998–2001); WCRS-FM (2001–2003); WHZQ (2003–2007); WYOR (2007–2009)

Technical information
- Licensing authority: FCC
- Facility ID: 84438
- Class: A
- ERP: 3,600 watts
- HAAT: 127 meters
- Transmitter coordinates: 34°12′16″N 81°54′37″W

Links
- Public license information: Public file; LMS
- Webcast: listen live
- Website: Official His Radio Website; His Radio - Greenville Website

WGFJ is a radio station located in Cross Hill, South Carolina. The station is licensed by the Federal Communications Commission (FCC) to broadcast on 105.1 FM with an ERP of 3,600 watts, serving the Greenwood, South Carolina area. It simulcasts WLFJ-FM and its Christian radio format.

== History ==
The station went on the air as WBDQ on July 17, 1998. On May 4, 2001, the station changed its call sign to WCRS-FM. On August 8, 2004 the station flipped to a CHR format under the WHZQ calls, using the name Q94. Shortly after, the format was flipped to Country as 94.1 The Bull. It simulcasted WCRS for a brief while as well as a Regional Mexican format in 2006 and 2007 after Peregon bought both stations from Pro-Com Communications LLC.

On August 9, 2007, the WYOR calls and the "Your 94" format was adopted with an Adult Contemporary format. After being on and off in early 2009, the station became silent along with its sister stations in May 2009, although it remained licensed by the FCC. In July 2009, the station filed to remain silent.

=== His Radio ===
In March 2010, His Radio WLFJ, based out of Greenville, SC had a successful fund raiser to purchase the station to enhance their signal in the area. The simulcast began in April 2010.
