= KZZQ =

KZZQ may refer to:

- KZZQ (FM), a radio station (101.9 FM) licensed to serve Richardton, North Dakota, United States
- KZNS-FM, a radio station (97.5 FM) licensed to serve Coalville, Utah, United States, which held the call sign KZZQ from 2008 to 2011
- KPUL, a radio station (99.5 FM) in Winterset, Iowa, United States, which had the call sign KZZQ from 1993 to 2008.
