= WKBR =

WKBR may refer to:

- WKBR-LP, a low-power radio station (102.3 FM) licensed to Town of Highlands, New York
- WZLC, a radio station (88.9 FM) licensed to Summerville, South Carolina, which held the call sign WKBR from 2011 to 2014
- WGAM, a radio station (1250 AM) licensed to Manchester, New Hampshire, which held the call sign WKBR from 1946 to 2007
- WZID, a radio station (95.7 FM) licensed to Manchester, New Hampshire, which held the call sign WKBR from 1947 to 1971
