= WTXR =

Radio station in Toccoa Falls, Georgia

Coordinates: 34.599°N 83.365°W

- Toccoa Falls, Georgia; United States
- Broadcast area: Toccoa, Georgia
- Frequency: 89.7 MHz
- Branding: His Radio Praise

Programming
- Format: Contemporary worship music

Ownership
- Owner: Radio Training Network, Inc.

History
- First air date: 1997
- Former call signs: WDPA (1996–1997)
- Call sign meaning: "The Crossroads" (original name)

Technical information
- Class: A
- ERP: 400 watts
- HAAT: 42 meters

Links
- Website: www.hisradiopraise.com

WTXR is a radio station on 89.7 FM in Toccoa Falls, Georgia, United States. The station is owned by Radio Training Network of Greenville, South Carolina, and is part of its His Radio Praise network carrying a contemporary worship music format. Prior to being owned by RTN, WTXR was the student-run campus radio station of Toccoa Falls College.

== History ==
Toccoa Falls College filed for a construction permit for a new FM radio station on July 13, 1995; the Federal Communications Commission approved the application on April 9, 1996. WTXR was licensed, initially as WDPA, on September 16, 1997, before changing call letters in November. The radio station played predominantly Christian rock and Contemporary Christian music but also featured various specialty shows. It was a companion to sister WRAF, which was also run by the college.

As time went on, students moved the station in a Christian rock direction as "The Eagle", helping give it a distinct identity from WRAF. WTXR, along with sister stations WEPC, WPFJ, WRAF, and translators W221AZ and W265AZ, were purchased by Radio Training Network, Inc. effective July 25, 2016 for $2.1 million.
