= Sarcoxie Public Square Historic District =

Historic district in Missouri, United States

- U.S. National Register of Historic Places
- U.S. Historic district
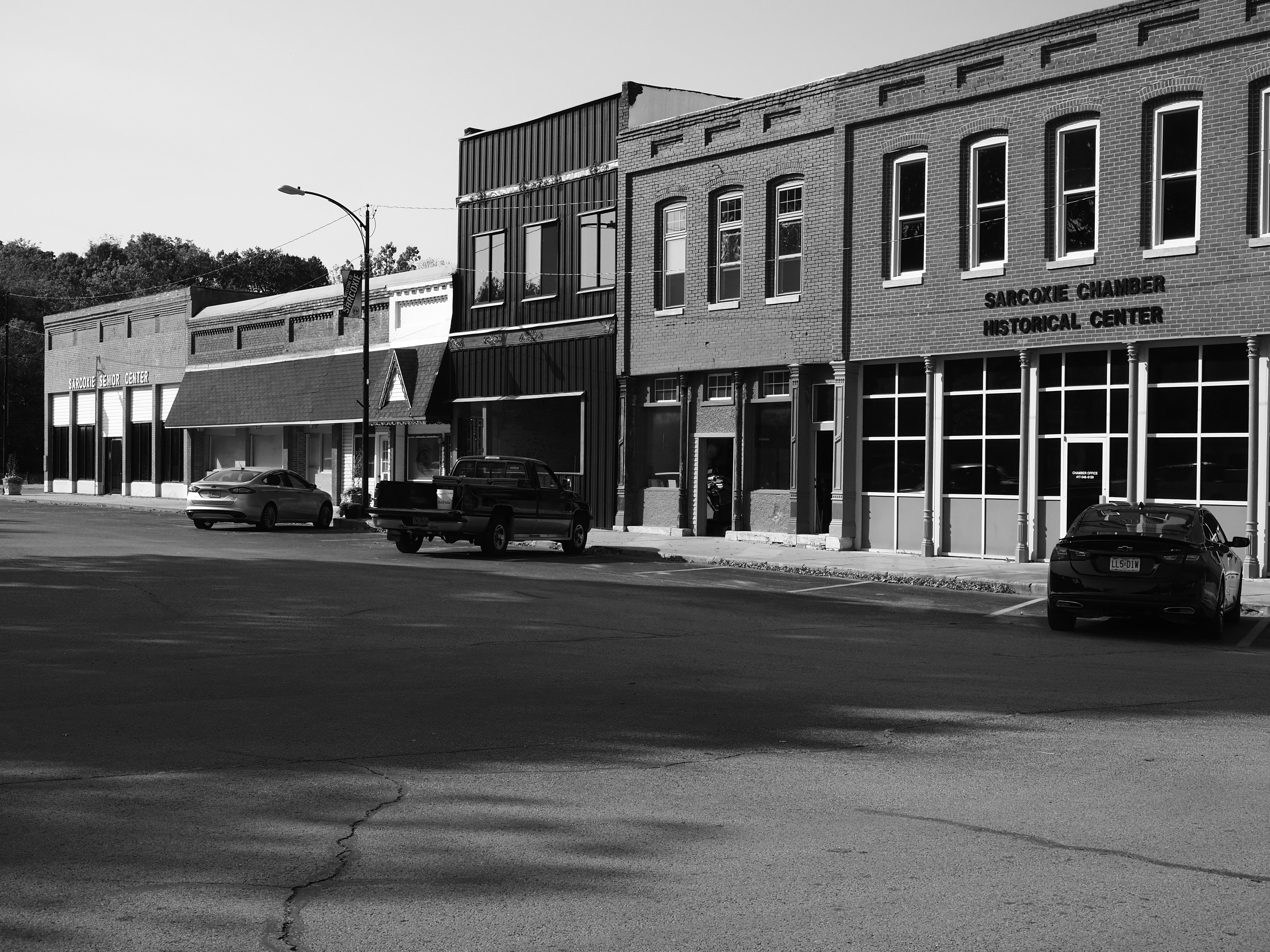

- Location within Missouri Location within the United States
- Location: Along 5th, 6th, Center & Cross Sts., Sarcoxie, Missouri
- Coordinates: 37°04′09″N 94°07′00″W
- Area: 5.5 acres (2.2 ha)
- Built: c. 1890
- Architectural style: One-Part Commercial Block, Two-Part Commercial Block
- NRHP reference No.: 14000872
- Added to NRHP: October 20, 2014

Sarcoxie Public Square Historic District is a national historic district located at Sarcoxie, Jasper County, Missouri. The district encompasses 26 contributing buildings, 1 contributing site, and 1 contributing structure in the central business district of Sarcoxie. It developed between about 1890 and 1965 and includes representative examples of commercial style architecture. Notable contributing resources include the Public Square and Gazebo (c. 1840, 1904); Sarcoxie Record (1889), Sarcoxie City Hall (c. 1900-1908), Sarcoxie Police (c. 1900), Parmley Garage (1910-1911), Sarcoxie Public Library (c. 1900), and Gene Taylor Library & Museum (c. 1894).

It was listed on the National Register of Historic Places in 2015.
