= Cave Spring School and Cave Spring Cemetery =

Historic site in Jasper County, Missouri, US

- U.S. National Register of Historic Places
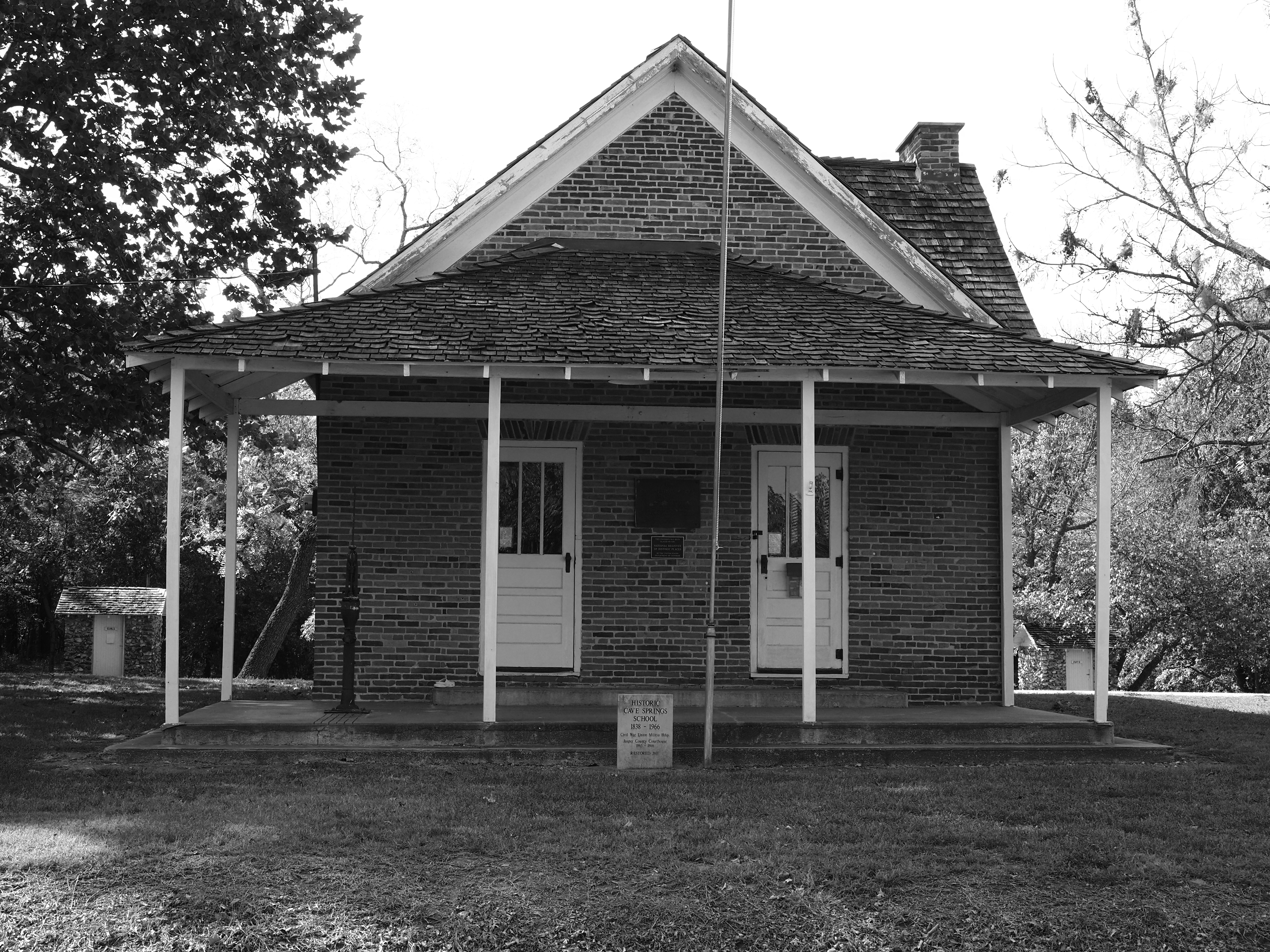

- Location within Missouri Location within the United States
- Location: 4323 Cty. Rd. 4, Sarcoxie, Missouri
- Coordinates: 37°06′45″N 94°03′45″W
- Area: 8.43 acres (3.41 ha)
- Built: c. 1840
- Built by: Duncan, William
- MPS: One-Teacher Public Schools of Missouri, MPDF
- NRHP reference No.: 12000416
- Added to NRHP: July 17, 2012

Cave Spring School and Cave Spring Cemetery is a historic school building and cemetery located near Sarcoxie, Jasper County, Missouri. The Cave Spring School was built about 1840, and reconstructed in 1875. It is a one-story brick building with a steeply pitched front gable and a wood shingle roof. It features a full-width hipped roof porch, added in about 1937. Associated with the school are two stone privies. The cemetery contains more than 420 marked graves dating from 1840 to the present. The school and cemetery are the last remnants of the Cave Spring community. The school building served as the temporary Jasper County Courthouse from October 1865 to September 1866.

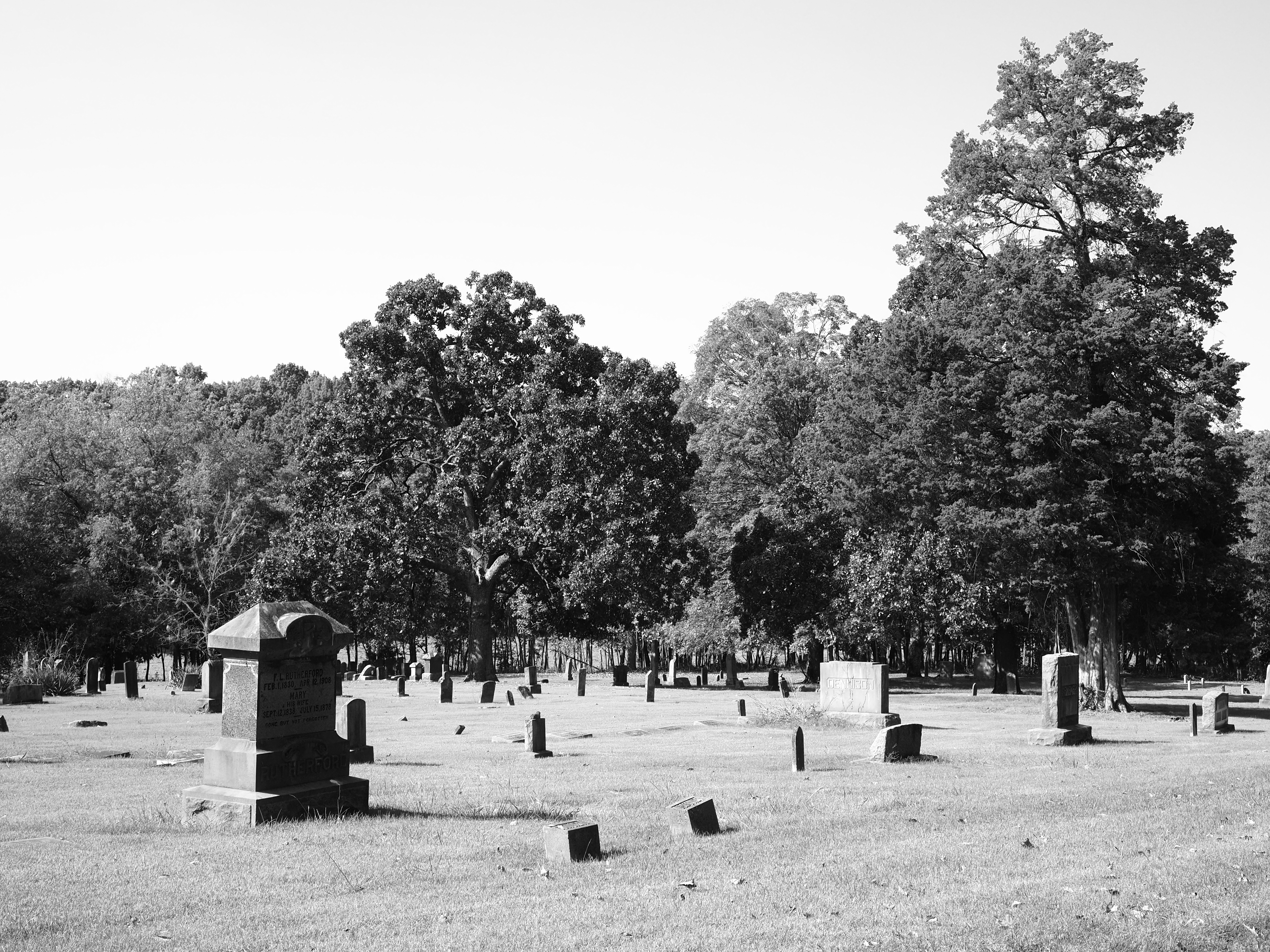
The cemetery

It was listed on the National Register of Historic Places in 2012.
