= WWRZ =

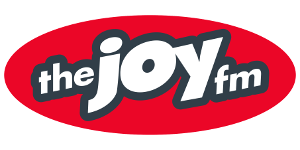
- The JOY FM logo
- Fort Meade, Florida; United States
- Broadcast area: Lakeland-Winter Haven
- Frequency: 98.3 MHz (HD Radio)
- Branding: The JOY FM

Programming
- Format: Contemporary Christian
- Subchannels: HD2: JOY Worhsip; HD3: LF Radio; HD4: Classic Joy

Ownership
- Owner: Radio Training Network
- Sister stations: WJIS

History
- First air date: 1990; 36 years ago (as WSCF)
- Former call signs: WSCF (1990-Nov. 1990); WXKT (1990–1991); WOKD-FM (1991–1993); WKGF-FM (1993–1996)
- Call sign meaning: RZ = "Rose" (after previous moniker)

Technical information
- Licensing authority: FCC
- Facility ID: 72687
- Class: C2
- ERP: 27,000 watts
- HAAT: 203 meters (666 ft)
- Transmitter coordinates: 27°51′11.1″N 81°52′1.3″W

Links
- Public license information: Public file; LMS
- Webcast: Listen live
- Website: thejoyfm.com

WWRZ (98.3 MHz) is a non-commercial Christian FM radio station in Fort Meade, Florida, broadcasting to the Lakeland-Winter Haven area of Central Florida. It broadcasts a Contemporary Christian radio format and is owned by Radio Training Network.

== Programming ==
=== 98.3 The Rose & MAX 98.3 ===
Prior to January 2, 2006, the station was dubbed "98.3 The Rose" and had an Adult Contemporary format. The station used the slogan "Playin' it All!" with a playlist that includes new wave, pop, rock, and dance hits from the 1970s through the 2010s. The station's schedule is automated, as is typical of most adult hits stations.

The station's longtime morning show, the "Big MAX Morning Show," was hosted by co-sidekicks Eric Michaels and Mike Lee. The show concluded on January 6, 2025.

WWRZ rebranded to "MAX at 98.3" at 11:00 AM, January 28, 2025, keeping its former slogan "Playin' it All" and adopting an adult hits variety format.

=== The JOY FM ===
On July 9, 2025, Hall Communications announced that they would be selling WWRZ to Radio Training Network, ending its adult hits format as the latter company focuses on Christian broadcasting, operating the Christian adult contemporary network "The JOY FM" based in Bradenton. The sale of the station was closed on October 1, 2025, when programming from The JOY FM took over. The station's final songs as MAX were "Movin' Out (Anthony's Song)" by Billy Joel and "So Long, Farewell" from The Sound of Music.

== Former logos ==
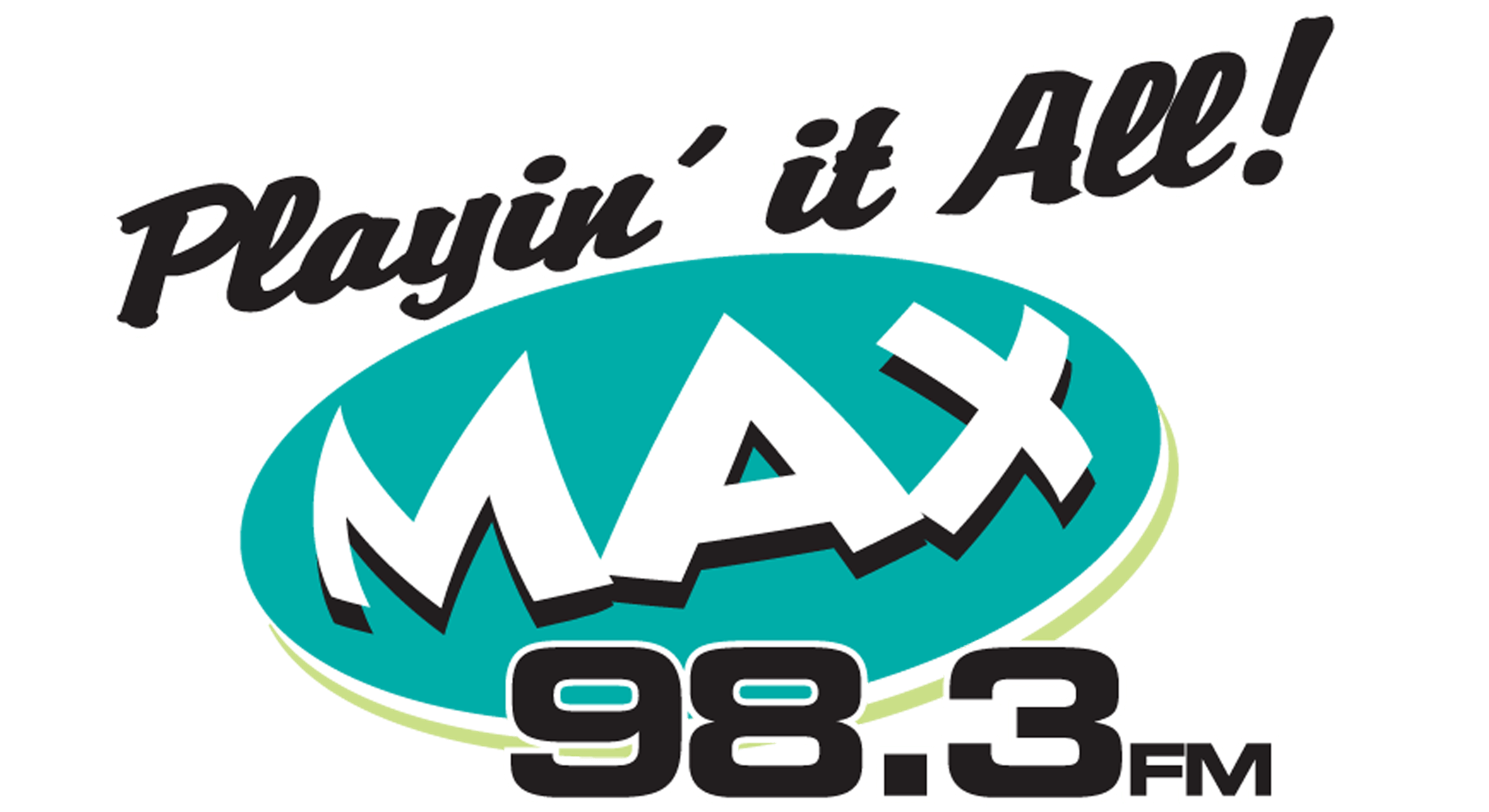
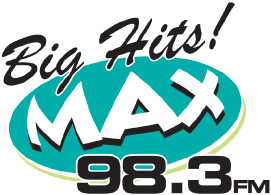
