= University of Toccoa Falls =

Christian liberal arts college in Toccoa Falls, Georgia

Coordinates: 34.59570°N 83.35160°W

- Former names: Golden Valley Institute (1907-1911); Toccoa Falls Institute (1911–1976); Toccoa Falls College (1976–2026)
- Motto: Where Character is Developed with Intellect
- Type: Private college
- Established: 1907
- Accreditation: SACS
- Academic affiliations: Christian and Missionary Alliance, Association for Biblical Higher Education, Council for Christian Colleges & Universities
- Endowment: $4.5 million
- President: Robert M. Myers
- Undergraduates: 3,500
- Location: Toccoa Falls, Georgia, United States
- Campus: 1,100 acres (450 ha); Rural
- Colors: Blue and gold
- Nickname: UTF
- Sporting affiliations: NCCAA
- Mascot: Screaming Eagle
- Website: utf.edu

University of Toccoa Falls is a private evangelical Christian university in Toccoa Falls, Georgia, United States, founded in 1907. The campus occupies 1,100 acres (450 ha), bordering the Chattahoochee National Forest and is home to Toccoa Falls, a 186-foot (57 m) high waterfall. It is affiliated with the Christian and Missionary Alliance and is accredited by the Commission on Colleges of the Southern Association of Colleges and Schools (SACS). The college is also a member of Council for Christian Colleges and Universities.

== History ==
In 1907, University of Toccoa Falls was founded by Professor Forest Schell in the community of Golden Valley, North Carolina, as the Golden Valley Institute. On January 1, 1911, Forrest put $10.00 down on the $25,000.00 purchase price for the Haddock Inn and 100 acres (400,000 m^{2}) of land in northeast Georgia. In October, he relocated the school to near Toccoa, Georgia, in order to be near a mainline railroad. He renamed the school Toccoa Falls Institute and added secondary school courses to the theological classes. A 1913 fire destroyed the Haddock Inn, which was the classroom and residence building. After operating in tents for a time, the school built a new campus. In 1928 the secondary courses were reorganized, and the state of Georgia accredited it as Toccoa Falls High School, which remained open until 1976. In 1937, the state chartered the four-year college program and allowed it to grant the degree Bachelor of Arts in Biblical Education.

In 1976, the college was renamed Toccoa Falls College. On November 6, 1977, the Kelly Barnes Dam, which had been built up and used by the college for electrical power since the Toccoa Falls Institute days, collapsed. The 40-acre (160,000 m^{2}) lake it impounded drained through the lower part of the campus. The resulting flood killed 39 people and injured 60, as well as destroying much of the on-campus married student housing and damaging part of the men's dormitory. The dam was never rebuilt. With the destruction of the dam and the subsequent draining of the lake, there exists no possibility of a similar flood.

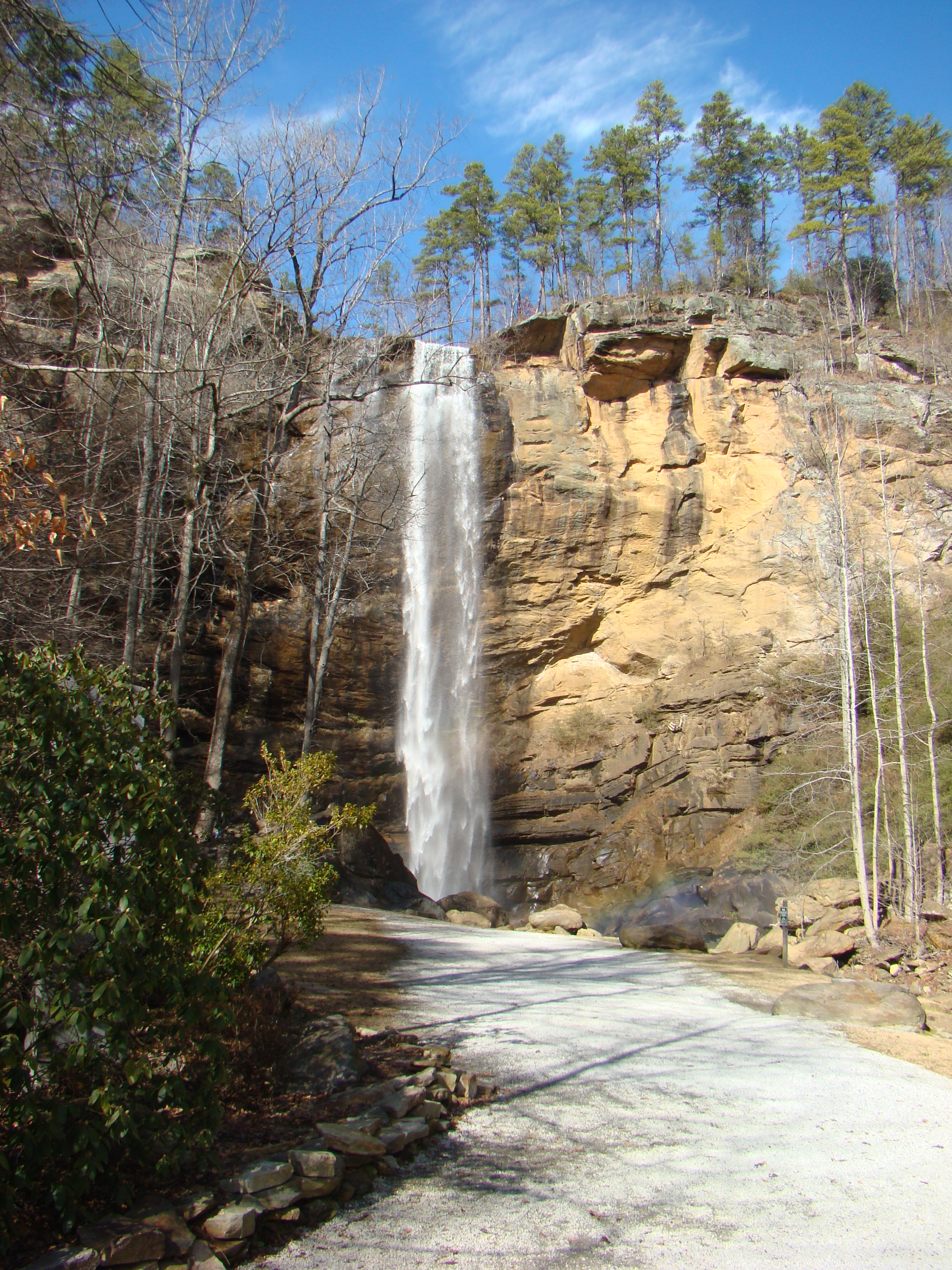
Toccoa Falls

On January 12, 2009, Gate Cottage, one of the most historic buildings on campus, was destroyed by fire. The cottage had been built in 1939 and was the fourth oldest building on campus. No one was in the building at the time of the fire. Gate Cottage has been rebuilt with a bigger gift shop and dining area for various occasions, but without the School of Counseling, which was relocated to a new location between the Mission Building and Bandy Hall.

On July 1, 2026, the institution was renamed University of Toccoa Falls, reflecting its range of academic programs and its graduate school.

== Toccoa Falls ==
With a vertical drop of 186 feet (57 m), Toccoa Falls, located on the college campus, stands as one of the tallest free-falling waterfalls in the eastern United States. The waterfall was purchased in 1907 as part of the campus of Toccoa Falls College and stands today as the distinguishing landmark of the college. Locals commonly refer to it as "The Falls."

== Academics ==
University of Toccoa Falls consists of five schools (School of Christian Ministries, School of Arts and Sciences, School of Teacher Education, the Fetterman School of Nursing, and the Gary Chapman School of Graduate Studies) with a total of ten departments. Within these departments, 35 majors and 43 minors are offered. The Seby Jones Library is the primary academic library on campus.

== Campus life ==
University of Toccoa Falls offers a wide variety of activities. Intercollegiate and intramural sports as well as the Student Government Association (SGA) are two of the main extracurricular possibilities for student participation.

=== Campus housing and residence life ===
On-campus student housing consists of single-sex dormitories, a large men's dormitory, two women's dormitories, and some smaller, suite-style dormitories, as well as various cottages, including married student housing. On-campus housing is advised by the college in the handbook, and is required for all regular underclassmen. There is a mandatory curfew for all on-campus students.

- Forrest Hall - men's dormitory
- Letourneau and Fant Halls - women's dormitories
- Terraces - men's terraces and women's terraces (these include Alys Reeder, Louise Bell, Damron, McDuffy, Powell, Tyler, Prentice and Hilyard)
- Married student apartments (colloquially, MSA)

=== Radio ===
The college's student-run radio station was WTXR, The Eagle 89.7. The college also operated WRAF, a radio station with various teaching and preaching programming as well as Christian music and a weekly Radio Theater program. All of the college's radio holdings, including WTXR and WRAF, were sold to Radio Training Network, Inc. effective July 25, 2016, for $2.1 million. WRAF is now a repeater station for WLFJ-FM at W220CK.

== Athletics ==
The Toccoa Falls athletic teams are called the Screaming Eagles. The college is a member of the National Christian Collegiate Athletic Association (NCCAA), primarily competing as an independent in the South Region of the Division II level.

University of Toccoa Falls offers a variety of sports, both intercollegiate and intramural. Men's sports include soccer, baseball, basketball, and disc golf. Women's sports include soccer, basketball, and volleyball.

- The baseball team won the NCCAA Division II National Championship in 2009, 2011, 2012, and 2013. Additionally, in 2012 and 2013 the baseball team won the NCCAA Division II Regional Championship.
- The women's soccer team won the NCCAA Division II Regional Championship in 2010.
- The women's basketball team won the NCCAA Division II National Championship in 1986 and 1992.

Intramural sports include soccer, basketball, softball, spike ball, tennis, volleyball, beach volleyball, ultimate frisbee, and flag football.

== Notable alumni ==
- Aaron Shust - Contemporary Christian music artist
- Isaac Robinson - 2x Disc Golf World Champion
- Kirt Schneider
