= WJIS =

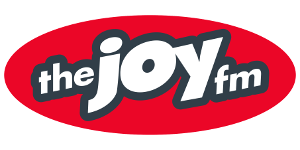
- Bradenton, Florida; United States
- Broadcast area: Sarasota metropolitan area
- Frequency: 88.1 MHz (HD Radio)
- Branding: The JOY FM

Programming
- Format: Contemporary Christian
- Subchannels: HD2: Christian worship; HD3: Christian hip hop

Ownership
- Owner: Radio Training Network

History
- First air date: 1986; 40 years ago
- Call sign meaning: Jesus is our Savior

Technical information
- Licensing authority: FCC
- Facility ID: 54857
- Class: C1
- ERP: 100,000 watts
- HAAT: 121 meters (397 ft)
- Transmitter coordinates: 27.132°N 82.394°W
- Translator: See § Translators
- Repeater: See § Network

Links
- Public license information: Public file; LMS
- Webcast: Listen live
- Website: florida.thejoyfm.com

WJIS (88.1 FM), known on air as The JOY FM, is a Christian adult contemporary station serving North, Central and Southwest Florida, including the Sarasota metropolitan area and Tampa Bay areas, and is owned by the Radio Training Network. The JOY FM is not only local to Bradenton, but it has many stations and translators across Florida, Georgia, and Alabama.

== Network ==
Call sign	Frequency	City of license	Facility ID	ERP W	Height m (ft)	Class	FCC info
WAQV	90.9 FM	Crystal River, Florida	40159	5,000	87.7 m (288 ft)	A	FCC (WAQV)
WCIE	91.5 FM	New Port Richey, Florida	60262	75,000	388.5 m (1,275 ft)	C0	FCC (WCIE)
WCRJ	88.1 FM	Jacksonville, Florida	48390	8,000	194 m (636 ft)	C3	FCC (WCRJ)
WDVH-FM	101.7 FM	Trenton, Florida	21797	22,000	106.3 m (349 ft)	A	FCC (WDVH-FM)
WHIJ	88.1 FM	Ocala, Florida	40160	1,250	117 m (384 ft)	A	FCC (WHIJ)
WHLG	101.3 FM	Port St. Lucie, Florida	27674	3,300	128 m (420 ft)	A	FCC (WHLG)
WFLJ	89.3 FM	Frostproof, Florida	93274	10,000 vertical	117.7 m (386 ft)	C3	FCC (WFLJ)
WJFH	91.7 FM	Sebring, Florida	81147	2,000	137.1 m (450 ft)	A	FCC (WJFH)
WJIS	88.1 FM	Bradenton, Florida	54857	100,000	121 m (397 ft)	C1	FCC (WJIS)
WJLF	91.7 FM	Gainesville, Florida	21506	2,550	99.3 m (326 ft)	A	FCC (WJLF)
WNUE-FM	98.1 FM	Deltona, Florida	46969	50,000	145 m (476 ft)	C2	FCC (WNUE-FM)
WTSM	97.9 FM	Woodville, Florida	89051	6,000	95 m (312 ft)	A	FCC (WTSM)
WWRZ	98.3 FM	Fort Meade, Florida	72687	27,000	203 m (666 ft)	C2	FCC (WWRZ)

On April 19, 2021, RTN launched The JOY FM on WNUE-FM 98.1, which the organization concurrently filed to buy from Entravision Communications for $4 million.

During most of 2013, WJIS was also simulcasted on 91.7 WFTI-FM in St. Petersburg; that station would cease operations in fall 2013, to allow for upgrades of adjacent channel WCIE and co-channel WJFH.

The Radio Training Network also has The JOY FM-branded stations in Dothan, Alabama (WIZB); Montgomery, Alabama (WPHH); Athens, Georgia (WMSL); and Atlanta / Macon, Georgia (WVFJ-FM and WWWD), though these stations do not repeat WJIS 24/7.

=== HD radio ===
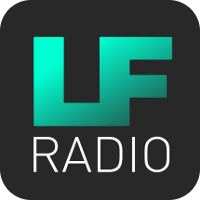
LF Radio Logo

WCIE, WJIS, WJLF, WHIJ and WWRZ broadcast in HD Radio format. On HD2, the stations broadcast "Joy Worship", a channel that features traditional Christian worship songs. On HD3, the stations broadcast "LF Radio" (named after its predecessor "LightForce Radio"), a progressive youth music channel. WWRZ broadcasts "Classic Joy" on its HD4 channel, a station featuring 20th century and early 21st century worship favorites. All of these stations can be heard online or on The JOY FM phone app.

== Translators ==
In addition to the full-powered stations, The JOY FM is relayed by additional translators:

Broadcast translator for WJIS
Call sign	Frequency	City of license	FID	ERP (W)	HAAT	Class	FCC info
W208AR	89.5 FM	Lake Placid, Florida	91738	10	103.5 m (340 ft)	D	LMS

Broadcast translators for WCIE
Call sign	Frequency	City of license	FID	ERP (W)	HAAT	Class	FCC info
W220EK	91.5 FM	Oldsmar, Florida	106676	30	314 m (1,030 ft)	D	LMS
W229BM	93.7 FM	Riverview, Florida	146760	100	310.9 m (1,020 ft)	D	LMS

Broadcast translators for WWRZ
Call sign	Frequency	City of license	FID	ERP (W)	HAAT	Class	FCC info
W242AK	96.3 FM	Lakeland, Florida	76167	180	83 m (272 ft)	D	LMS
W291AG	106.1 FM	Highland City, Florida	76175	250	186 m (610 ft)	D	LMS
W300CY	107.9 FM	Lake Wales, Florida	145128	100	122 m (400 ft)	D	LMS

Two of its translators are leased out to Clear Channel Communications (now iHeartMedia) to rebroadcast their stations:

- W290BJ 105.9 MHz West Tampa, rebroadcasting WMTX's HD2 signal; originally leased out to rebroadcast WFLA (AM)
- W237CW 95.3 MHz Pinellas Park, Florida, rebroadcasting WDAE

== On air ==
The Joy FM has multiple on-air DJs. Some states may have different on-air DJs than others.

- The Morning Cruise: Weekdays 6 am -10 am. This show includes Dave Cruse, Bill Martin, and Carmen Brown.
- Candice Grey, weekdays 10 am - 3 pm (Florida stations only).
- The Jayar Show: Weekdays, 3 pm - 7 pm. This show includes Jayar. (The show previously included Lex the Producer, but she left the show in February 2023).
- Michelle Tellone, Evenings 7 pm - 11 pm.
- Lizz Ryals, Saturdays 1 pm - 6 pm (excluding Alabama stations).
- Sandy James, Saturdays 8 am -1 pm and Sundays 1 pm - 6 pm.
- Jerry Williams, Weekdays 10 am - 3 pm (Georgia), Sundays 10 am - 2 pm (Alabama), 6 pm - 9 pm (Florida).
- Terris, Weekdays 9 am - 3 pm (Alabama stations only).
- Rob Langer, Saturdays 5 am - 8 am, Sundays 12 pm - 3 pm (Georgia stations only).
- Benji Shepherd, Saturdays 6 pm - 9 pm (Georgia stations only).
- Paige Long, Saturdays 9 pm - 12 am, Sundays 7 pm - 12 pm (Georgia stations only).
- Jules, Sundays 3 pm - 7 pm (Georgia stations only).
