= Seby Jones Library =

Coordinates: 34°35′40″N 83°21′24″W

- Location: United States
- Type: Academic library

Other information
- Director: Patricia Fisher
- Website: http://www.toccoafalls.edu/library/

The Seby Jones Library is the primary academic library on the campus of Toccoa Falls College. Among its many holdings, the Seby Jones Library has a collection of 85000 books, 56000 ebooks, and 215 databases. It was also believed that for many years the Seby Jones Library housed the largest flannelgraph collection in the United States, though this assertion was never proved.

== Information literacy ==
One of the many interests that the staff of the Seby Jones Library has is Information Literacy. In particular, the Public Service staff is continually employed in instructing students in how to verify that the information they have found in their research is of a scholarly nature.
