= WIXC =

Coordinates: 28°39′47″N 80°55′17″W

- Titusville, Florida; United States
- Broadcast area: Brevard County
- Frequency: 1060 kHz
- Branding: I Am Country 1060

Programming
- Format: Classic country

Ownership
- Owner: Genesis Communications I, Inc.
- Operator: Marc Radio Orlando, LLC

History
- First air date: October 20, 1957
- Former call signs: WRMF (1965–1979); WAMT (1979–2001)
- Call sign meaning: similar to "Wixie" (former branding)

Technical information
- Licensing authority: FCC
- Facility ID: 54505
- Class: B
- Power: 50,000 watts (day); 17,000 watts (critical hours); 5,000 watts (night)
- Translator: 105.5 W288DZ (Titusville)

Links
- Public license information: Public file; LMS
- Webcast: Listen live
- Website: iamcountryradio.com

WIXC (1060 AM) is a commercial radio station licensed to Titusville, Florida, United States, and serving the Space Coast. It has a classic country format branded as "I Am Country 1060". It is owned by Genesis Communications I, Inc. and operated by Marc Radio Orlando, LLC. The main radio studio is in Mims, north of Titusville. A sales office formerly located in the Suntree area of Melbourne was closed.

The transmitter is on West Main Street in the Sweetwater Downs neighborhood in Mims.

== History ==
On October 20, 1957, the station first signed on the air as once WRMF, serving as the AM counterpart to WRMF-FM, which at the time broadcast at 98.3 MHz in Titusville. That station is now WNUE, relocated to 98.1 MHz in Deltona, Florida. The WRMF call letters are now used for a station in Palm Beach, Florida, at 97.9 MHz.

In the early 2000s, WIXC had been the Space Coast network affiliate for ESPN Radio through July 31, 2008. It was also the local affiliate for the Tampa Bay Rays games, as well as NASCAR NEXTEL Cup races. WIXC switched from its previous sports talk format to primarily classic country music on August 1, 2008.

It dumped the classic country format after two months and before one ratings period had taken place when its LMA deal with Whiskey River Broadcasting, Inc. fell apart, and went gone to a news/talk format with a significant amount of brokered paid programming. WIXC continues to air a significant amount of sports content. It became Brevard County's flagship station for live high school football broadcasts in the fall of 2009 but lost that programming to WMEL 1300.

On August 9, 2015, WIXC became AM 1060 WMEL. On October 31, 2016 at noon, WIXC returned to the NewsTalk 1060 brand when "WMEL" moved its programming to WWBC AM 1510.

On February 4, 2019, WIXC flipped to a Regional Mexican format, in a trimulcast with WTMP-FM and WMGG. Just over a month later, WIXC split away from the trimulcast, picking up Spanish-language sports ESPN Deportes Radio. That network disbanded in September 2019, with WIXC and other affiliates switching to TUDN Radio, another Spanish language sports radio network.

Around July 2022, WIXC shifted back to English-language sports under the Fox Sports Radio affiliation.

In late March 2024, WIXC flipped back to Classic country under the branding "I Am Country 1060", operated by MARC Radio Orlando ahead of purchasing the station.

== Previous logo ==
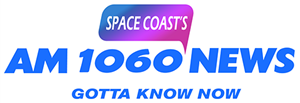
