= WHRZ-LP =

Low-power radio station in Spartanburg, South Carolina

- Spartanburg, South Carolina; United States
- Frequency: 104.1 MHz
- Branding: The Z

Programming
- Language: English
- Format: Christian contemporary hit radio

Ownership
- Owner: First Baptist Church of Spartanburg

History
- First air date: May 19, 2005
- Call sign meaning: "Hangar Radio" (former branding)

Technical information
- Licensing authority: FCC
- Facility ID: 131757
- Class: L1
- ERP: 47 watts
- HAAT: 43.5 meters (143 ft)
- Transmitter coordinates: 34°57′01″N 81°55′39″W

Links
- Public license information: LMS
- Webcast: Listen live
- Website: thez.com

WHRZ-LP (104.1 FM, "The Z") is a non-commercial low-power radio station in Spartanburg, South Carolina. Owned by the First Baptist Church of Spartanburg, it broadcasts a youth-oriented Christian contemporary hit radio format. The station is licensed by the FCC to broadcast with an ERP of 47 watts (.047 kW). Its transmitter is located on the former WSPA-TV tower in downtown Spartanburg. The station has a range of approximately 10 miles, although it reaches a wider audience via FM translators, and syndication of its programming on HD Radio subchannels of Radio Training Network's WLFJ-FM and WLFS.

== History ==
Former logo

The station originally signed on the air on May 19, 2005, broadcasting a Christian contemporary hit radio format targeting teenagers and young adults. It initially used the branding Hangar Radio Z, referencing the nickname for the Church's recently-constructed youth center ("The Hangar"), which also housed the station's studios.

== Translators ==
In addition to the main station at 104.1, the station operates multiple FM translators to broaden its coverage over the upstate of South Carolina, as well as the Charleston area:

Broadcast translators for WHRZ-LP
Call sign	Frequency	City of license	FID	ERP (W)	Class	FCC info
W238AW	95.5 FM	West View, South Carolina	142981	55	D	LMS
W289AO	105.9 FM	Anderson, South Carolina		27	D	
W216BJ	91.1 FM	Wando, South Carolina	91735	10	D	LMS
W220CN	91.9 FM	Charleston, South Carolina	91737	10	D	LMS

As part of an agreement with Radio Training Network, the station's programming is also simulcast on the HD Radio subchannels of WLFJ-FM/Greenville and WLFS/Port Wentworth—co-branded as His Radio Z.
