= WLTS (FM) =

- Greer, South Carolina; United States
- Broadcast area: Greenville - Spartanburg - Upstate South Carolina
- Frequency: 103.3 MHz
- Branding: Air1

Programming
- Format: Contemporary worship music
- Affiliations: Air1

Ownership
- Owner: Educational Media Foundation
- Sister stations: WKVG, WLTE

History
- First air date: January 1993; 33 years ago (as WLYZ)
- Former call signs: WRDQ (1991–1992); WLYZ (1992–1995); WXWZ (1995–1996); WOLT (1996–2014); WRTH (2014–2023)
- Call sign meaning: Similar to WLTE

Technical information
- Licensing authority: FCC
- Facility ID: 73241
- Class: A
- ERP: 2,700 watts
- HAAT: 151 meters (495 ft)
- Transmitter coordinates: 34°59′54″N 82°8′17″W

Links
- Public license information: Public file; LMS
- Webcast: Listen Live
- Website: air1.com

WLTS (103.3 MHz) is a non-commercial FM radio station licensed to Greer, South Carolina. It is owned by the Educational Media Foundation and broadcasts a contemporary worship music format known as "Air1". It serves the Greenville-Spartanburg radio market in Upstate South Carolina.

The station is licensed by the Federal Communications Commission (FCC) to broadcast with an effective radiated power (ERP) of 2,700 watts. WLTS' transmitter is in Wellford off State Route S-42.

== History ==
=== WLYZ, WXWZ ===
The 103.3 facility signed on the air in January 1993 as WLYZ, a simulcast of WLWZ (103.9 FM)'s urban contemporary format as "Double Z". WLYZ was intended to cover the Spartanburg part of the market.

In late 1994, the station's owner, Emerald City Broadcasting, purchased WWMM (107.3 FM) and moved the urban format to the new station since it had a much stronger signal than the 103.3/103.9 simulcast. WWMM was relaunched as WJMZ "107.3 Jamz", while the 103 simulcast became alternative rock "103-X" with 103.3 picking up the WXWZ call sign and 103.9 picking up the WXWX call sign in early 1995. 103-X was the first alternative rock station in the market, but the same signal problems that the station(s) had remained.

=== WOLT and Howard Stern ===
On January 1, 1996, 103-X added The Howard Stern Show for morning drive time; the station was faced with a backlash from both radio listeners and advertisers. During that time, Emerald City decided to sell the stations to Entercom. 103-X changed formats to oldies in February 1996. A few months later, 103.9 became WOLI and 103.3 became WOLT. The stations took their programming from a satellite-delivered oldies service for the next few years with no local DJs. In late 1999, a local airstaff was finally added.

In November 2000, the station jumped on the 1980s hits bandwagon that was going on at the time. The moniker became "Star 103", but the stations retained the same call signs. The syndicated Bob and Sheri radio show based in Charlotte was added. A new airstaff was also hired. Over time, the station slowly evolved toward classic hits, but kept the Star 103 handle. In late 2003, WOLT and WOLI changed their format to a contemporary Christian/country hybrid as "The Walk".

=== Davidson Media ===
In 2005, Entercom sold WOLT, WOLI, and WSPA (910 AM, now WOLI) to Davidson Media Group, while retaining "The Walk" and placing it on its newly acquired 106.3 (WGVC) signal. Davidson Media Group, a company that specializes in Latino music but offered other formats, time-brokered the entire station. WOLT's morning airtime went to Spartanburg legend Bill Drake, and the rest of the airtime went to a company that carried an urban gospel format, branding the station as "Praize 103.3" (this started in October 2005).

In 2006, following differences between Davidson Media Group and the company managing "Praize 103.3", the urban contemporary gospel format was abruptly dropped on August 10, 2006. The following morning, after Bill Drake's program, WOLT debuted an oldies format, programmed by Davidson. The station was known, when not airing brokered programming, as "103.3 WOLT - The Best of the 60s and 70s". WOLT subsequently brokered a large part of its airtime out to various other music/local affairs programming, and also became the flagship station for Furman University football, basketball, baseball, and coaches shows until 2013. Classic hits was the underlying 'format' of the station outside of brokered time, as an attempt to give the station an identity that tied in with all of the other classic based programs during brokered times.

In January 2012, WOLT began running CHR mix programming in certain dayparts, using syndicated programming from Chicago-based company Jamtraxx, billing their dayparted hours as "103-3 SPIN FM". During all other hours, they broadcast and identified simply as "103-3 WOLT".

=== Earth FM ===
On March 1, 2013, the Earth FM oldies format on WOLI (910 AM, and later an accompanying FM translator on 105.7), which had been launched by Davidson Media in 2012, moved to 103.3, and all brokered programming was removed. The station continued to focus on oldies and classic hits from the mid-1960s through early 1980s.

In February 2014, Davidson Media Group sold WOLT to Earth Radio Broadcasting LLC. The purchase was consummated on February 24, 2014, at a price of $1 million. On March 12, 2014, Salem Communications, through licensee Caron Broadcasting, Inc., purchased WOLT from Earth Radio Broadcasting. The purchase was consummated on May 6, 2014, at a price of $1.125 million. On April 24, 2014, WOLT changed its call sign to WRTH. On March 15, 2015, WRTH began simulcasting on WLTE (95.9 FM) in Pendleton, South Carolina.

Previous logo

Throughout 2015 and 2016, the station's playlist was adjusted, removing most 1960s titles, emphasizing on 1980s music with music from the 1970s reduced and 1990s added. In 2022, the playlist was adjusted further, with the station focusing on rock hits from the 1980s, 90s, and early 2000s with some newer music being played. The station occasionally played a song from the late 1970s.

On July 14, 2023, WLTE competed a move to 95.5 at its new transmitter site in Powdersville which gave the station more complete coverage of the Greenville portion of the market while still serving Anderson and Pickens counties. WRTH's 103.3 signal continued to serve eastern Greenville and Spartanburg county, giving the simulcast almost full market coverage. The stations' positioner was changed to "95.5 and 103.3 Earth FM, 80s and 90s Throwbacks".

=== Air1 ===
On August 23, 2023, an FCC filing disclosed that Salem would sell WRTH and WLTE, along with WGTK-FM, to the Educational Media Foundation for $6.775 million. EMF took over operations before the sale's closure by a local marketing agreement. The majority of the station's air staff was let go at the end of September 2023, with the classic hits format continuing in to October, culminating with special farewell programming and a 90-minute set of music with goodbye-themed songs, signing off at 12:19 am on October 29 after playing the closing theme from WKRP in Cincinnati, with program director Craig Debolt signing off and IDing the stations one final time. The stations briefly stunted with AC/DC’s Hell's Bells until they flipped to EMF's Air 1 network shortly after, with WLTE being the first to change at 12:30 am, and WRTH being the second at 2:25 am. The sale was consummated on November 6, 2023. On December 4, 2023, EMF filed to change the station's call sign to WLTS, which became effective December 17.
