= WFTI-FM =

Radio station in St. Petersburg, Florida

St. Petersburg, Florida; United States
- Broadcast area: Tampa Bay
- Frequency: 91.7 MHz
- Branding: The Joy FM

Programming
- Format: Christian AC

Ownership
- Owner: Radio Training Network, Inc.

Technical information
- Facility ID: 21034
- Class: A
- ERP: 3,000 watts
- HAAT: 86.0 meters
- Transmitter coordinates: 27°46′15.00″N 82°38′19.00″W

Links
- Website: florida.thejoyfm.com

WFTI-FM (91.7 FM) was a radio station broadcasting a Christian AC format. Licensed to St. Petersburg, Florida, United States, it served the Tampa Bay area. The station was owned by the Radio Training Network, repeating the signal of Bradenton-based WJIS 88.1 MHz.

Prior to October 2012, the station was owned by the Family Radio ministry, rebroadcasting most programs broadcast by that network. That month, WFTI was purchased by the Radio Training Network for $2.5 Million. In early March 2013, shortly after the sale was completed, WFTI began broadcasting The Joy FM programming, fully simulcasting the schedule of WJIS.

On November 21, 2013, the licensee surrendered the station's license to the Federal Communications Commission (FCC). The licensee noted that the surrender was necessary to begin signal improvements of its sister stations WCIE 91.5 New Port Richey and WJFH 91.7 Sebring, both, like WFTI, simulcasting WJIS. The FCC cancelled WFTI-FM's license on November 21, 2013.
