= Kirt Schneider =

American Messianic Jewish pastor

Rabbi Kirt A. Schneider
- Born: Beachwood, Ohio United States
- Other name: Messianic Rabbi Schneider
- Known for: Host of "Discovering the Jewish Jesus"; founder of "Taking the Rainbow Back" movement
- Height: 1.72 m (5 ft 8 in)
- Title: Rabbi; Evangelist; Author
- Spouse: Cynthia Schneider (m. 1983)
- Children: 2
- Parent(s): David Schneider (father); Elaine Schneider (mother)
- Website: discoveringthejewishjesus.com

Kirt A. Schneider is an American Messianic Jewish pastor, author, and evangelist. He is the founder and host of the television and radio ministry "Discovering the Jewish Jesus".

== Early life and conversion ==
Schneider was raised in a Jewish‑American background in Beachwood, Ohio. In 1978 at age 20, he experienced a vision of Jesus on the cross at which time he began to read the New Testament and explore churches. He later enrolled in Toccoa Falls College earning a B.S. in Bible theology in 1985 and receiving the "Preacher of the Year" award.

== Ministry and work ==
In 1989, Schneider moved to Fremont, Ohio to become pastor of Fremont Alliance Church, and the following year started a non-denominational, independent church in Fremont.

In 2002, he became the spiritual leader of the Messianic Congregation Adat Adonai in West Toledo, Ohio, using the title "rabbi." He changed the congregation's name to "Lion of Judah" in 2014 to attract new people, noting his TV ministry was drawing tens of thousands but his congregation only had 200 people, potentially because Christians thought it was Jewish and they were not Jewish. Schneider's use of the title "rabbi" has been disputed since he did not attend a rabbinical college. Schneider notes he did not become a rabbi through the traditional route of attending an Orthodox yeshivah, but as a teacher who inspires more than a million people. He says he uses the title "rabbi" for authoritative respect, likening it to calling a pastor "pastor".

In 2023 he launched the movement "Taking the Rainbow Back", described as a response to the appropriation of rainbow symbolism by LGBTQ activism and a call for the body of Christ to reclaim the symbol. Schneider has authored multiple books including Awakening to Messiah: A Supernatural Discovery of the Jewish Jesus, Self‑Deliverance, Decoding the Torah, and Do Not Be Afraid.

== Theological focus ==
Schneider's teachings emphasize the Jewish roots of Christianity, the continuity between the Old Testament (Hebrew Scriptures) and the New Testament, spiritual warfare, and end‑times readiness of the church.

In 2004, Schneider planned a 13-week series "Discovering the Jewish Jesus" which was hosted on the Christian TV station WLMB.

== Selected publications ==
- Awakening to Messiah: A Supernatural Discovery of the Jewish Jesus. WestBow Press. 2012. ISBN 978-1-4497-0587-9.
- Self‑Deliverance: How to Gain Victory Over the Powers of Darkness. Baker Publishing Group. 2015. ISBN 9781441269362.
- Called to Breakthrough: An Autobiography. Charisma House. 2021. ISBN 9781629999999.
- Decoding the Torah: Applying Ancient Wisdom in a Modern World. Charisma House. 2025. ISBN 9781636414140.
