= WHRT-FM =

Radio station in Cokesbury, South Carolina, United States

- Cokesbury, South Carolina; United States
- Frequency: 91.9 MHz
- Branding: Classic HIS Radio

Programming
- Format: Christian classic hits

Ownership
- Owner: Radio Training Network

History
- Former call signs: WKRI (2008–2014); WAHP (2014–2019)
- Call sign meaning: W HeaRT

Technical information
- Licensing authority: FCC
- Facility ID: 173883
- Class: C3
- ERP: 20,500 watts
- HAAT: 108 meters
- Transmitter coordinates: 34°21′26″N 82°09′14″W

Links
- Public license information: Public file; LMS

WHRT-FM is a non-commercial radio station licensed to Cokesbury, South Carolina, that broadcasts on a frequency of 91.9 MHz and covers Greenwood, Laurens, and Clinton.

Owned by Radio Training Network, it carries a Christian classic hits format branded as "Classic HIS Radio", fed by WLFJ-HD4.

== History ==
Oldies WKRI, along with WFBK Fort Mill, South Carolina and WKBR Summerville, South Carolina, was sold by Spirit Broadcasting Group Inc. for $460,832.
