= WHLG =

Radio station in Port St. Lucie, Florida

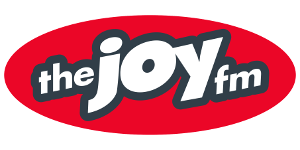
- Port St. Lucie, Florida; United States
- Broadcast area: Treasure Coast
- Frequency: 101.3 MHz (HD Radio)
- Branding: The JOY FM

Programming
- Format: Contemporary Christian
- Subchannels: HD2: Christian worship "The Joy; HD3: Christian hip hop

Ownership
- Owner: Radio Training Network, Inc.

History
- First air date: November 16, 1998
- Call sign meaning: Harvey L. Glascock

Technical information
- Licensing authority: FCC
- Facility ID: 27674
- Class: A
- ERP: 3,300 watts
- HAAT: 128 meters (420 ft)
- Transmitter coordinates: 27°12′53.00″N 80°15′24.00″W

Links
- Public license information: Public file; LMS
- Webcast: Listen live
- Website: florida.thejoyfm.com

WHLG (101.3 FM) is a Christian radio station broadcasting a Contemporary Christian format, licensed to Port St. Lucie, Florida. The station serves the Treasure Coast from Vero Beach to North Palm Beach and is Radio Training Network, Inc.

== History ==
Horizon Broadcasting reached a deal in May 2021, to sell WHLG and WTSM near Tallahassee to Radio Training Network, which owns The JOY FM regional network of Christian Contemporary radio stations, for $1.3 million. The sale was consummated on August 31, 2021.

On September 1, 2021, WHLG changed their format from adult contemporary to contemporary Christian, branded as "The JOY FM".
