= WTSM =

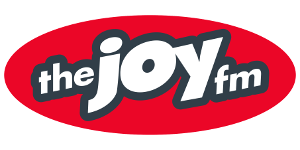
- Woodville, Florida; United States
- Broadcast area: Tallahassee, Florida
- Frequency: 97.9 MHz (HD Radio)

Programming
- Format: Contemporary Christian
- Subchannels: HD2: Contemporary worship music "Joy Worship"; HD3: Christian hip hop "LF Radio"
- Network: The Joy FM

Ownership
- Owner: Radio Training Network, Inc.

History
- First air date: September 7, 2003 (as WJZT)
- Former call signs: WJZT (2003–2010)
- Call sign meaning: "Tallahassee's Sports Monster", from sports format 2010–2021

Technical information
- Licensing authority: FCC
- Facility ID: 89051
- Class: A
- ERP: 6,000 watts
- HAAT: 95.3 meters
- Transmitter coordinates: 30°22′10″N 84°06′0″W

Links
- Public license information: Public file; LMS
- Webcast: Listen live
- Website: florida.thejoyfm.com

WTSM (97.9 FM) is a Christian radio station licensed to Woodville, Florida, United States, serving Tallahassee. It is owned by Radio Training Network, Inc., and broadcasts a Contemporary Christian format branded as "The Joy FM".

== History ==
WJZT began broadcasting on September 7, 2003, a year after the station was granted a construction permit by the Federal Communications Commission. It originally aired a smooth jazz format and was owned by Kathy and Ernie Petrone. In 2006, WJZT Communications, LLC, a division of Horizon Broadcasting, acquired the station for $2.3 million.

After a brief stint as oldies "Cruisin' 97.9", WJZT flipped to sports on December 1, 2010, as "Tallahassee's Sports Monster", using ESPN Radio programming.

Horizon Broadcasting reached a deal to sell WTSM and WHLG in Port St. Lucie to Radio Training Network, which owns The Joy FM regional network of Christian radio stations, for $1.3 million in May 2021. The sale was consummated on August 31, 2021.

On September 1, 2021, WTSM changed their format from sports to contemporary Christian, branded as "The Joy FM".

== Previous logo ==
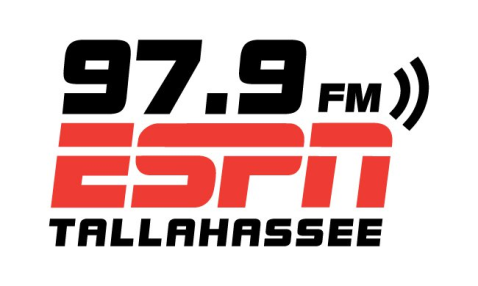
