= WKVG (FM) =

- Greenville, South Carolina; United States
- Broadcast area: Upstate South Carolina; Western North Carolina
- Frequency: 94.5 MHz (HD Radio)

Programming
- Format: Christian contemporary
- Subchannels: HD2: K-Love Eras; HD3: Christian radio "The Truth"
- Network: K-Love

Ownership
- Owner: Educational Media Foundation
- Sister stations: WLTE, WLTS

History
- First air date: August 15, 1960
- Former call signs: WMUU-FM (1960–2013); WGTK-FM (2013–2023)
- Call sign meaning: K-Love Greenville

Technical information
- Licensing authority: FCC
- Facility ID: 73296
- Class: C
- ERP: 100,000 watts
- HAAT: 454 meters (1,490 ft)
- Transmitter coordinates: 34°56′29.00″N 82°24′41.00″W
- Translator: HD3: 96.9 W245CH (Travelers Rest)

Links
- Public license information: Public file; LMS
- Webcast: Listen Live; Listen Live (HD2)
- Website: klove.com

WKVG (94.5 MHz) is a noncommercial educational FM radio station licensed to Greenville, South Carolina, United States, serving Upstate South Carolina including the Greenville-Spartanburg market. WKVG is owned and operated by the Educational Media Foundation, and is an affiliate of K-Love.

WKVG has an effective radiated power (ERP) of 100,000 watts, the maximum for most FM stations. The transmitter is on Tower Road in Travelers Rest. WKVG broadcasts using HD Radio technology. WKVG is north western South Carolina's primary entry point station for the Emergency Alert System.

== History ==
=== WMUU-FM ===
Bob Jones University (BJU) applied for an AM license in May 1948. It was granted a construction permit with a new station signing on the air on September 15, 1949. The call sign was WMUU and it broadcast at 1260 kilocycles (today's WPJF). The programming was sacred and classical music, along with dramatic readings, and evangelical Christian preaching. The call sign stood for "World's Most Unusual University", an early promotional slogan of BJU. Bob Jones, Sr., the founder of BJU, intended the station to operate independently by accepting advertising rather than being supported by the university, but he did not expect the station to make a profit. The AM station eventually increased its power from 1,000 to 5,000 watts.

An FM station was added, signing on the air on August 15, 1960. The call sign was WMUU-FM. In 1965, it became the second FM stereo station in South Carolina. In 1963, WMUU-FM became one of the most powerful FM stations in South Carolina, radiating 100,000 watts and increasing its listening radius from fifty to a hundred miles. Bob Jones University also bought WAVO (1420 AM) in Atlanta but later sold it in order to focus on the Greenville station.

=== Paris Mountain and Wade Hampton Boulevard ===
In 1973, the WMUU building on the BJU campus was demolished to build Founder's Memorial Amphitorium, completed in 1973. For several years, the studios were located in the FM transmitter building on Paris Mountain. WMUU-AM-FM eventually moved to 920 Wade Hampton Boulevard, and BJU transferred ownership of the station to the Gospel Fellowship Association, its missionary arm, headquartered in the same building. WMUU became an independent corporation, although it maintained a close relationship with BJU, and most of its employees were graduates.

Many faculty members in the university's Fine Arts division participated in the station's early operation. For the first year, Bob Pratt served as a temporary manager. He was succeeded by James Ryerson who was station manager for nearly three decades. Jim Dickson, who had earlier managed WAVO, became manager in 1979, and Paul Wright took his place in 1996.

Bob Jones University eventually devoted the FM station to beautiful music, Sacred Christian music and preaching, with the AM station airing preaching and some religious music. In 2008, WMUU-FM sold its AM station, which became WPJF, a station with a Spanish Christian format. Some of the programming heard on AM 1260 moved to WMUU-FM, airing late nights.

=== Salem Media ===
On August 24, 2012, Bob Jones III announced the sale of WMUU-FM to Salem Communications, co-founded by BJU graduate Stuart Epperson. The sale price listed with the FCC was $3 million. The terms were $1 million in cash and $2 million in a promissory note. Salem introduced a conservative talk format on December 3, 2012, as "Conservative Talk 94.5", and the former WMUU-FM moved to online streaming exclusively.

Programming included a local news and call-in show hosted by Joey Hudson, later known as The Morning Answer. The rest of the schedule was nationally syndicated conservative talk, mostly from the co-owned Salem Radio Network, hosted by Mike Gallagher, Dennis Prager, Charlie Kirk, Brandon Tatum and Sebastian Gorka, and others. The Sean Hannity Show from Premiere Networks aired in afternoon drive time. Weekends featured shows on money, health, religion, real estate and travel, some of which were paid brokered programming, as well as repeats of weekday talk shows. Most hours began with an update from Townhall News.

On February 11, 2013, Salem Communications changed the call sign of the station to WGTK-FM. At the time, Salem also owned WGTK (970 AM) in Louisville, Kentucky, which carried a similar format. In April 2016, to better align with other Salem conservative talk stations, the station re-branded as 94.5 The Answer.

=== K-Love ===
On August 23, 2023, an FCC filing disclosed that Salem would sell WGTK-FM, along with WRTH and WLTE, to the Educational Media Foundation for $6.775 million. EMF would take over operations before the sale's closure by a local marketing agreement, at which time the station would flip to EMF's K-Love network.

WGTK-FM joined K-Love on October 29, 2023, at 12:01 am. The sale was consummated on November 6, 2023, and the call sign was changed to WKVG on November 15.

== HD radio ==
- WKVG's HD2 digital subchannel currently broadcasts K-LOVE Eras. Prior to the sale to EMF, the Classic hits format aired on “Earth FM” (95.5 WLTE and 103.3 WRTH) was simulcast, and prior to May 2016, the format on this subchannel was called "Lite 102.9" with a soft adult contemporary format. Since being owned by EMF, it previously aired K-LOVE 2000s.
- WKVG's HD3 subchannel broadcasts a religious teaching format from Truth Broadcasting Network. From November 6, 2017, until October 2023, it broadcast an urban gospel format branded as "Rejoice 96.9". It feeds FM translator W245CH at 96.9 MHz in Travelers Rest.

WKVG's HD4 subchannel broadcast a Regional Mexican format branded as "Poder 102.9" and fed FM translator W275BJ at 102.9 MHz in Greenville until November 2023. Poder was previously heard on HD2 and on the FM translator at 96.9 MHz. Following the sale of WGTK-FM to EMF, the Poder format moved to WROQ’s HD3 subchannel while also remaining on the 102.9 translator until 2025.
