= Sarcoxie, Missouri =

- City
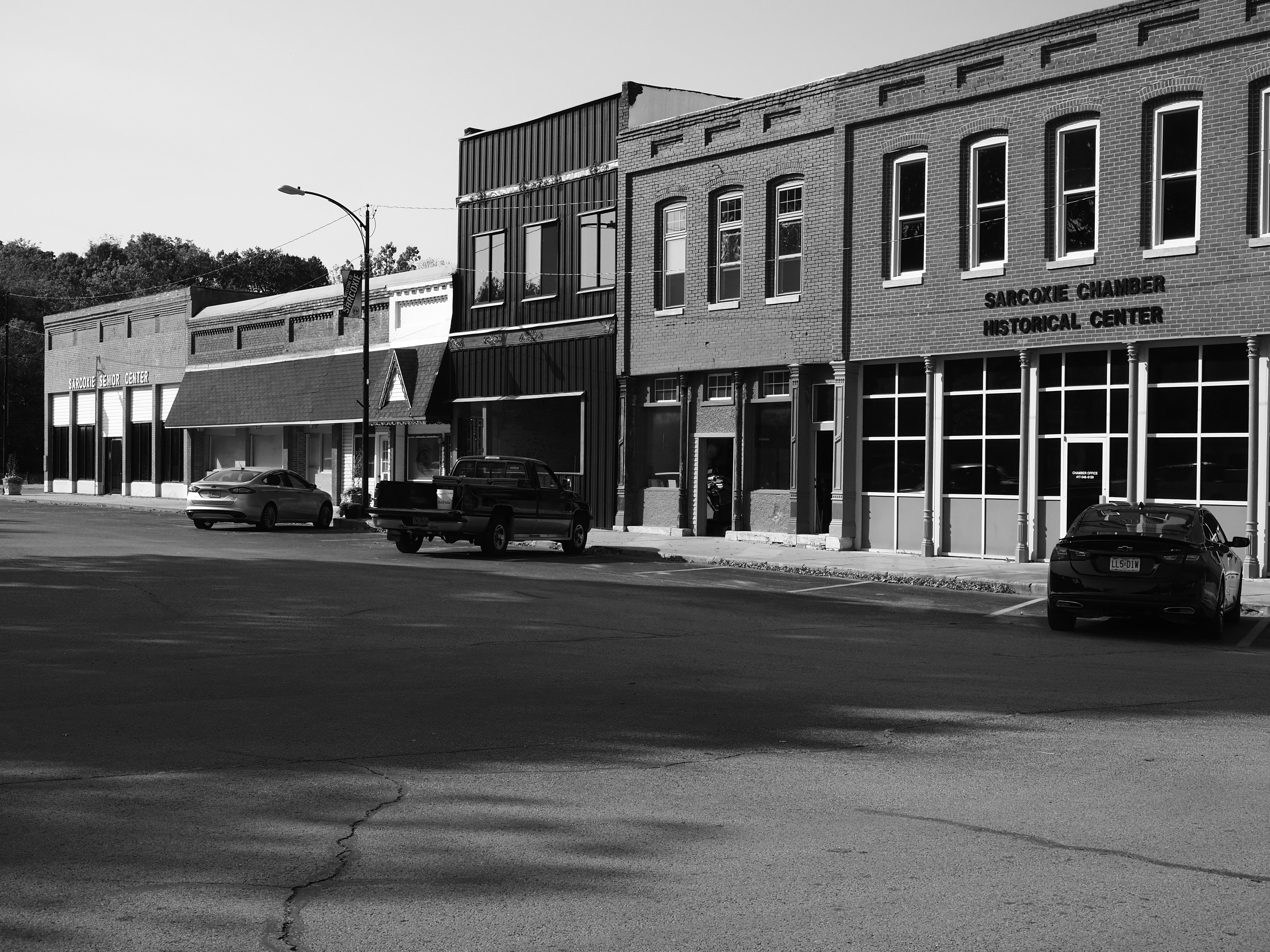
- Proposed Flag
- Nickname: Scratchy
- Location of Sarcoxie, Missouri
- Coordinates: 37°04′03″N 94°07′06″W
- Country: United States
- State: Missouri
- County: Jasper

Area
  - Total: 1.41 sq mi (3.66 km^{2})
  - Land: 1.40 sq mi (3.63 km^{2})
  - Water: 0.015 sq mi (0.04 km^{2})
- Elevation: 1,171 ft (357 m)

Population (2020)
  - Total: 1,406
  - Density: 1,003.3/sq mi (387.39/km^{2})
- Time zone: UTC-6 (Central (CST))
  - Summer (DST): UTC-5 (CDT)
- ZIP code: 64862
- Area code: 417
- FIPS code: 29-65990
- GNIS feature ID: 2396536
- Website: City Website

Sarcoxie (/sɑːrˈkɒksi/ sar-KOK-see) is a city in Jasper County, Missouri, United States. The population was 1,406 at the 2020 census. It is part of the Joplin, Missouri Metropolitan Area.

== History ==
Sarcoxie was platted in the early 1830s, and it was originally called Centerville from its location upon Center Creek. In 1839, the settlement was renamed in honor of Sarcoxie, a chief of the Delaware Indians who had settled near a spring in the present town limits.

Sarcoxie was once the strawberry capital of the world and still is the peony capital of the world, and home to Gilbert H. Wild, one of America's largest growers of daylilies, irises, and peonies. Sarcoxie once had its own currency that had a picture of a strawberry on one side.

During the start of the Civil War in 1861, Franz Sigel's independent command passed through Sarcoxie on June 28 before attempting to attack the separated commands of Sterling Price and Missouri Governor and General Claiborne Fox Jackson. Price was rumored to be at Pool's Prairie, moving to the Confederate forces in Northwest Arkansas.

The Sarcoxie Public Square Historic District and the nearby Cave Spring School and Cave Spring Cemetery are listed on the National Register of Historic Places listings in Jasper County, Missouri.

== Geography ==
According to the United States Census Bureau, the city has a total area of 1.08 square miles (2.80 km^{2}), all land.

== Demographics ==
Historical population
| Census | Pop. | Note | %± |
|---|---|---|---|
| 1880 | 341 | | — |
| 1890 | 1,172 | | 243.7% |
| 1900 | 1,126 | | −3.9% |
| 1910 | 1,311 | | 16.4% |
| 1920 | 1,023 | | −22.0% |
| 1930 | 1,017 | | −0.6% |
| 1940 | 1,057 | | 3.9% |
| 1950 | 1,042 | | −1.4% |
| 1960 | 1,056 | | 1.3% |
| 1970 | 1,175 | | 11.3% |
| 1980 | 1,381 | | 17.5% |
| 1990 | 1,330 | | −3.7% |
| 2000 | 1,354 | | 1.8% |
| 2010 | 1,341 | | −1.0% |
| 2020 | 1,406 | | 4.8% |
U.S. Decennial Census

=== 2010 census ===
As of the census of 2010, there were 1,330 people, 526 households, and 350 families living in the city. The population density was 1,231.5 inhabitants per square mile (475.5/km^{2}). There were 615 housing units at an average density of 569.4 per square mile (219.8/km^{2}). The racial makeup of the city was 95.3% White, 0.2% African American, 1.4% Native American, 0.5% Asian, 0.1% Pacific Islander, 0.5% from other races, and 2.2% from two or more races. Hispanic or Latino of any race were 1.4% of the population.

There were 526 households, of which 34.0% had children under the age of 18 living with them, 47.1% were married couples living together, 13.7% had a female householder with no husband present, 5.7% had a male householder with no wife present, and 33.5% were non-families. 29.7% of all households were made up of individuals, and 12.6% had someone living alone who was 65 years of age or older. The average household size was 2.48 and the average family size was 3.01.

The median age in the city was 38.9 years. 26.9% of residents were under the age of 18; 6.9% were between the ages of 18 and 24; 24.5% were from 25 to 44; 24.4% were from 45 to 64; and 17.3% were 65 years of age or older. The gender makeup of the city was 47.2% male and 52.8% female.

=== 2000 census ===
As of the census of 2000, there were 1,354 people, 559 households, and 359 families living in the city. The population density was 1,254.6 inhabitants per square mile (484.4/km^{2}). There were 635 housing units at an average density of 588.4 per square mile (227.2/km^{2}). The racial makeup of the city was 95.94% White, 0.07% African American, 0.96% Native American, 0.07% from other races, and 2.95% from two or more races. Hispanic or Latino of any race were 0.81% of the population.

There were 559 households, out of which 31.1% had children under the age of 18 living with them, 50.8% were married couples living together, 10.6% had a female householder with no husband present, and 35.6% were non-families. 32.0% of all households were made up of individuals, and 19.5% had someone living alone who was 65 years of age or older. The average household size was 2.36 and the average family size was 2.99.

In the city the population was spread out, with 26.4% under the age of 18, 7.9% from 18 to 24, 25.5% from 25 to 44, 19.3% from 45 to 64, and 20.9% who were 65 years of age or older. The median age was 36 years. For every 100 females, there were 80.8 males. For every 100 females age 18 and over, there were 75.0 males.

The median income for a household in the city was $25,000, and the median income for a family was $34,519. Males had a median income of $26,250 versus $20,547 for females. The per capita income for the city was $13,531. About 10.7% of families and 16.8% of the population were below the poverty line, including 21.3% of those under age 18 and 18.7% of those age 65 or over.

== Education ==
Public education in Sarcoxie is administered by Sarcoxie R-II School District.

Sarcoxie has a lending library, the Sarcoxie Public Library.

== Flag proposal ==
In June 2024, a flag proposal was made for the city. The flag is a reversed "French-like" tri-color with the seal of the city in the middle.

The proposal has not been recognized by the city yet but has been by a large number of people. Until then, there is no official flag yet for the city of Sarcoxie.

Two designs were made with the same layout and colors, but different coat of arms. One with the city's official seal and one with a strawberry and the text "City of Sarcoxie" on top and "In God We Trust" on the bottom.

== Notable people ==
- Lloyd Spencer (1893–1981), U.S. senator from Arkansas
- Gene Taylor (1928–1998), U.S. representative from Missouri

== See also ==
- KCKJ
