= KPUL =

Christian contemporary hit radio station in Winterset, Iowa

Winterset, Iowa; United States
- Broadcast area: Des Moines metropolitan area
- Frequency: 101.7 MHz
- Branding: Pulse 101.7

Programming
- Language: English
- Format: Christian contemporary hit radio

Ownership
- Owner: Positive Impact Media, Inc.

History
- First air date: June 1, 1992
- Former call signs: KTDG (1990–1992); KBBM (1992–1994); KZZQ (1994–2008)
- Former frequencies: 99.5 MHz (1993–2015)
- Call sign meaning: Pulse

Technical information
- Licensing authority: FCC
- Facility ID: 19792
- Class: A
- ERP: 6,000 watts
- HAAT: 100 meters (328 ft)
- Transmitter coordinates: 41°24′2.00″N 93°54′58.00″W
- Translator: 95.5 K238AN (Ames)

Links
- Public license information: Public file; LMS
- Webcast: Listen Live
- Website: pulse1017.com

KPUL (101.7 FM, "Pulse 101.7") is a Christian contemporary hit radio formatted radio station. It is licensed to Winterset, Iowa, United States,, with studios located on 335th Street in Waukee. It is one of only a few independent stations in the Des Moines metropolitan area radio market.

The transmitter is off Quail Ridge Lane in Winterset. In Ames, the station can also be heard on 25 watt translator station K238AN at 95.5 MHz.

== History ==
=== KBBM ===
The FCC issued a construction permit for station KTDG on May 7, 1990. The station was not put on the air though until June 1, 1992, as KBBM. The station had no locally produced content. It used 24-hour news feeds from CNN Headline News and CNNfn, positioning itself as "Des Moines Business Station".

The format was never a ratings winner and was only heard for a little over a year before KBBM was sold.

=== Q99.5 KZZQ ===
In March 1993, the station was purchased by Positive Impact Media Inc., a non profit group. The station's initial purpose was to rebroadcast the programming of a contemporary Christian music (CCM) station in the Quad Cities. But within a few months KBBM found itself in need of its own programming due to the failure of the Quad Cities station. On March 2, 1994, at noon, The station switched its format to Christian CHR and rebranded itself as Q99.5 KZZQ, or "The Q". It were the first station to bring Christian CHR to Des Moines, and was successful in attracting listeners and receiving support through donations and advertising throughout the first decade.

In 2004, KZZQ had competition for the first time as the University of Northwestern – St. Paul purchased two local stations, KNWI Life 107.1 and KNWM Life 96.1. It programmed the stations with Christian AC. Although they also suffer from weak signals, together Life 107.1 and Life 96.1 cover much of the market. This was something KZZQ struggles to do with its lower power (6,000 watts) and a transmitter located southwest of Des Moines. Due to increased competition from Life 107 and other stations entering the market, and staff turnover, listenership continued to decline and it became apparent a change was required.

=== Pulse 99.5 KPUL ===
After several days of stunting in February 2008, the station was re-branded KPUL "Pulse 99.5". The new format became an experimental mix of CCM and CHR–Pop in an effort to reach more people through a hybrid format. The new format proved to be a more aggressive change than listeners in the area were ready for.

After a few months under the new format, Pulse 99.5 re-adjusted its format to a mix of Christian CHR, rock, and positive mainstream hits.

=== Pulse 101.7 ===
On October 6, 2010, the station announced an "upgrade" involving changing its frequency to 101.7 FM and a rebranding to Pulse 101.7. These upgrades involved other area radio stations (KTIA-FM and IPR). The Federal Communications Commission (FCC) approved the changes in the Fall of 2014.

The target date for the move to 101.7 FM was March 31, 2015, and after a delay due to weather, the tower upgrades were made on April 14. The station retained the same format that it most recently used as "Pulse 99.5". "Pulse 101.7" also retained the same coverage pattern as that of the former 99.5 range across Des Moines and south Central Iowa.

== Translators ==
Broadcast translator for KPUL-FM
Call sign	Frequency	City of license	FID	ERP (W)	Class	FCC info
K238AN	95.5 (Note: Translator owned by the Fourthstream Media, Inc.) FM	Ames, Iowa	148032	25	D	LMS
