= WRFJ =

- Fort Mill, South Carolina; United States
- Broadcast area: Fort Mill, South Carolina
- Frequency: 91.5 MHz

Programming
- Format: Christian Contemporary Praise & Worship

Ownership
- Owner: Radio Training Network, Inc.

Technical information
- Licensing authority: FCC
- Facility ID: 175640
- Class: A
- ERP: 140 watts horiz 110 watts vert
- HAAT: 36 meters
- Transmitter coordinates: 35°00′17″N 80°58′54″W

Links
- Public license information: Public file; LMS

WRFJ is a non-commercial radio station located in Fort Mill, South Carolina, United States, that broadcasts on a frequency of 91.5 MHz. It is owned by the Radio Training Network. Since August 2014, the station has been a repeater for RTN's Christian Contemporary Praise & Worship format, His Radio Praise.

The station broadcasts at only 140 watts from a tiny (by modern broadcasting standards) 118 ft (36 m) tower west of downtown Fort Mill. The modest power and short tower are mainly due to being short-spaced to WSGE in Dallas, North Carolina at nearby 91.7 FM. It can only be heard clearly in Fort Mill itself. Even in areas of Charlotte close to the South Carolina line, the signal is marginal at best; it can't be heard at all even in areas of York County close to Fort Mill, such as Rock Hill and Lake Wylie. Most of the Charlotte area has to rely on streaming for the full HIS Radio Praise schedule.
