= WLTE =

- Powdersville, South Carolina; United States
- Broadcast area: Greenville - Spartanburg - Upstate South Carolina
- Frequency: 95.5 MHz (HD Radio)
- Branding: Air1

Programming
- Format: Contemporary worship music
- Affiliations: Air1

Ownership
- Owner: Educational Media Foundation
- Sister stations: WKVG, WLTS

History
- First air date: January 2015
- Former call signs: WTCO (2008); WESL (2008–2009); WEZG (2009); WVGC (2009–2012)
- Former frequencies: 95.9 MHz (2008–2023)
- Call sign meaning: "Lite" (former branding) or Life to the Earth

Technical information
- Licensing authority: FCC
- Facility ID: 170949
- Class: A
- ERP: 6,000 watts
- HAAT: 89 meters (292 ft)
- Transmitter coordinates: 34°41′19″N 82°36′16″W

Links
- Public license information: Public file; LMS
- Webcast: Listen Live
- Website: air1.com

For the former WLTE in Minneapolis-Saint Paul, MN, see (KMNB-FM)

WLTE (95.5 FM) is a non-commercial radio station licensed to Powdersville, South Carolina. It is owned by the Educational Media Foundation and broadcasts a contemporary worship music format known as "Air1". It serves the western side of the Greenville-Spartanburg radio market in Upstate South Carolina.

The station is licensed by the Federal Communications Commission (FCC) to broadcast with an effective radiated power (ERP) of 6,000 watts. WLTE's transmitter is off Fire Tower Road in Piedmont.

== History ==
The 95.9 allocation was originally part of the FCC’s 2007 spectrum auction, with Georgia-Carolina Wireless, LLC, owners of WGOG, winning bidder, with a construction permit originally granted that same year. Originally, WGOG was going to move to 95.9 to cover a larger population; due to objections, the plans were abandoned and the construction permit was sold to Salem Media Group in 2014. The facility signed on the air in April 2015 as WLTE at 95.9 MHz, a simulcast of WRTH (103.3 FM)'s classic hits format known as "Earth FM". WLTE was intended to cover the portions of the market west of Greenville, notably Anderson, Pickens, and Oconee counties.

On July 14, 2023, WLTE competed a move to 95.5 at its new transmitter site in Powdersville which gave the station more complete coverage of the Greenville portion of the market while still serving Anderson and Pickens counties. WRTH's 103.3 signal continued to serve eastern Greenville and Spartanburg county, giving the simulcast almost full market coverage. The stations' positioner was changed to "95.5 and 103.3 Earth FM, 80s and 90s Throwbacks".

On August 23, 2023, an FCC filing disclosed that Salem would sell WRTH and WLTE, along with WGTK-FM, to the Educational Media Foundation for $6.775 million. EMF took over operations before the sale's closure by a local marketing agreement. The majority of the station’s air staff was let go at the end of September 2023, with the classic hits format continuing in to October, culminating with special farewell programming and a 90 minute set of music with goodbye-themed songs, signing off at 12:19am on October 29 after playing the closing theme from WKRP in Cincinnati, with program director Craig Debolt signing off and ID’ing the stations one final time. The stations briefly stunted with AC/DC’s Hell’s Bells until they flipped to EMF's Air 1 network shortly after. The sale was consummated on November 8, 2023.
