= WSCF-FM =

- Vero Beach, Florida; United States
- Broadcast area: Treasure Coast
- Frequency: 91.9 MHz (HD Radio)
- Branding: 91.9 Christian FM

Programming
- Format: Contemporary Christian

Ownership
- Owner: Treasure Coast Educational Media, Inc.

History
- First air date: February 1, 1990

Technical information
- Licensing authority: FCC
- Facility ID: 9871
- Class: C3
- ERP: 15,500 Watts
- HAAT: 93 meters (305 ft)
- Transmitter coordinates: 27°38′11.12″N 80°27′58.19″W
- Translator: See § Translators

Links
- Public license information: Public file; LMS
- Website: christianfm.com

WSCF-FM (91.9 MHz) is a radio station broadcasting a contemporary Christian radio format. Licensed to Vero Beach, Florida, the station has been owned since 1990 by Treasure Coast Educational Media, Inc. Christian FM also broadcasts on 96.3 FM in Port St. Lucie. In 2011, the station moved its facilities near to I-95 in Vero Beach, Florida. Prior to its current facilities, the station operated from the Central Assembly of God's main campus, located just west of the Indian River Mall. The station's transmitter is located behind the church.

WSCF-FM began broadcasts on February 1, 1990, and was the first contemporary Christian radio station to serve the Treasure Coast and Space Coast areas of Florida.

WSCF-FM also serves as the flagship station for the Christian FM Networks, which serves scores of stations across the US with Christian music and personalities. Christian FM Networks syndicates the format and programming via Dial Global.

== Translators ==
Broadcast translators for WSCF-FM
Call sign	Frequency	City of license	FID	ERP (W)	HAAT	Class	FCC info
W227AF	93.3 FM	Melbourne, Florida	9872	55	56 m (184 ft)	D	LMS
W242AC	96.3 FM	Port St. Lucie, Florida	22646	10	139 m (456 ft)	D	LMS
W252BB	98.3 FM	Vero Beach South, Florida	151781	13	119 m (390 ft)	D	LMS
W253AG	98.5 FM	Cocoa, Florida	79318	170	28 m (92 ft)	D	LMS
W291AL	106.1 FM	Fort Pierce, Florida	81610	170	33 m (108 ft)	D	LMS
W297AG	107.3 FM	Stuart, Florida	83230	10	28 m (92 ft)	D	LMS
