= WOLI (AM) =

- Spartanburg, South Carolina; United States
- Broadcast area: Upstate South Carolina
- Frequency: 910 kHz
- Branding: Kaliente 102.9 and 105.7

Programming
- Format: Spanish tropical
- Affiliations: Charlotte FC

Ownership
- Owner: Norberto Sanchez; (Norsan Media LLC)
- Sister stations: WSPA-FM

History
- First air date: September 1, 1940 (as WORD)
- Former call signs: WORD (1940–2002); WSPA (2002–2005)
- Call sign meaning: "Oldies" (dates back to when then-sister stations WOLT and WOLI-FM were both known as "Oldies 103")

Technical information
- Licensing authority: FCC
- Facility ID: 34388
- Class: B
- Power: 3,600 watts day; 890 watts night
- Transmitter coordinates: 35°1′10.4″N 82°0′35.4″W
- Translator: 105.7 W289BS (Spartanburg)
- Repeater: 101.1 WROQ-HD2 (Anderson)

Links
- Public license information: Public file; LMS
- Website: www.kalientesc.com

WOLI (910 kHz) is a Spanish tropical AM radio station located in Spartanburg, South Carolina. The station is licensed by the Federal Communications Commission (FCC) to broadcast with power of 3,600 watts in the daytime and 890 watts at night under separate directional signal patterns.

== History ==
WSPA 950 AM signed on the air on February 17, 1930, as South Carolina's first radio station, beating out WCSC in Charleston and WIS in Columbia by several months. Programming was mostly local, but national shows included those of Gene Autry, Fats Waller and Wayne King. The station was owned by Virgil Evans during its first 10 years on the air. WSPA was sold on June 1, 1940, to the Spartanburg Advertising Company, a group that was formed with the intention on starting a second radio station in Spartanburg, WORD 910 AM, which signed on in September of that year utilizing studio and office space from WSPA.

In 1944 the FCC ordered the WSPA-WORD combo to be broken up due to ownership regulations which forbid an owner from having no more than one AM station per market. This was completed on March 17, 1947, when WSPA and WSPA-FM were sold to Liberty Life Insurance and WORD was sold to Spartan Radiocasting (WSPA-FM 98.9 signed on as South Carolina's first FM station on August 29, 1946).

Well-known personalities included Cliff "Farmer" Gray, "Children's Theater" host Jane Dalton and Grover "Cousin Bud" Golightly who hosted "Hillbilly Hit Parade", and "Go with Golightly" with big band music.

In 1952, a dispute erupted between both Spartan Radiocasting and Liberty Life over the Spartanburg allocation for television channel 7 (which was won by Spartan and went on the air as WSPA-TV in 1956. It was settled in 1958 when Spartan Radiocasting bought back WSPA and WSPA-FM from Liberty Life Insurance and spinning off WORD and their FM sister WDXY 100.5 to different ownership.

A fire in May 1960 resulted in new offices being needed for the radio and TV stations.

Bill Drake joined WSPA and became its leading personality during its last two decades.

In 2002, Entercom (then owners of WORD/WYRD) swapped WORD's programming and call letters from 910 AM over to its newly acquired sister, WSPA's signal at 950 AM to gain better coverage. Then in 2005, WSPA as well as the FMs WOLI/WOLT were spun off to Davidson Media Group. The WSPA call letters were dropped per an agreement with WSPA-TV to surrender the WSPA calls if the radio station ever changed hands. With new calls of WOLI the station simulcasted parts of WOLI-FM programming with brokered programming. In 2007, the simulcasting with the FM ended and the station switched to Spanish religious programming, but retained the brokered programming, which then switched to black gospel January 2011 through August 2011, a few months of which were simulcast from Davidson-owned WRJD (then known as "Rejoice 1410" in Durham, North Carolina).

On September 1, 2011, WOLI relaunched as Yahoo! Sports Radio 910, which lasted until January 2012.

In August 2012, WOLI once again became Spartanburg's home to Wofford Terrier sports. After the Terriers left WOLI after the 2004 season, they returned to 910 AM as well as 105.7 FM.

On January 7, 2013, WOLI was relaunched as Earth 105.7 FM with an oldies format.

On March 1, 2013, the Earth FM oldies format moved to WOLT (since renamed WLTS). WOLI was relaunched as The Source @ 105.7/AM 910 with an adult standards and brokered programming format. The station also airs local sports.

On July 13, 2015, Davidson Media sold WOLI and eleven other stations to TBLC Holdings, with the sale to be completed on September 30, 2015. The sale was consummated on November 5, 2015, at a purchase price of $3.5 million.

On November 5, 2015, WOLI changed their format to regional Mexican, branded as "Activa 103.9" (at the time simulcasting WTOB-FM 103.9).

Effective June 26, 2020, TBLC Media sold WOLI to Norberto Sanchez's Norsan Media LLC for $150,000.

On March 15, 2024, Norsan Media bought WSPA-FM 106.3 as part of Audacy's exit plan from chapter 11 bankruptcy after it was placed under a divestiture trust, for $700,000. On April 1, 2024, at just after midnight, the 106.3 FM frequency started simulcasting WOLI as an effort to provide a stronger signal for listeners. On August 21, 2024, WOLI split from simulcasting WSPA-FM and flipped to Spanish tropical, branded as "Latina 105.7". In 2025, the station began simulcasting with WROQ-HD2 and its associated translator at 102.9 in Greenville, known as Kaliente 102.9 and 105.7.
