= KJTM-LP =

- Lincoln, Nebraska; United States
- Frequency: 107.9 MHz
- Branding: TiM FM

Programming
- Language: English
- Format: Christian contemporary hit radio

Ownership
- Owner: Brad and Carol Leggett; (Duo Ministries)

History
- Former call signs: KJFT-LP (2005–2022)

Technical information
- Licensing authority: FCC
- Facility ID: 135606
- Class: L1
- ERP: 100 watts
- HAAT: 28 meters (92 ft)
- Transmitter coordinates: 40°48′53.6″N 96°38′49.5″W
- Translator: 98.9 K255CS (Lincoln)

Links
- Public license information: LMS
- Website: timfm.com

KJTM-LP (107.9 FM) is a radio station licensed to Lincoln, Nebraska, United States. The station is owned by Carol and Brad Leggett, through licensee Duo Ministries. A translator, K255CS (98.9 FM) (owned by CSN International), serves areas of Lincoln's south and west sides.

The station was built by the Lincoln Chinese Ministry Association and began broadcasting in August 2006. Duo Ministries purchased the then-KJFT-LP in 2019. The present call sign was adopted on June 3, 2022.

== Construction permit ==
On December 20, 2019, KJFT-LP was granted a U.S. Federal Communications Commission (FCC) construction permit to move to a new transmitter site, increase ERP to 100 watts and increase HAAT to 28 meters.
