= WPJF =

- Greenville, South Carolina; United States
- Broadcast area: Upstate South Carolina
- Frequency: 1260 kHz
- Branding: Radio Vida 1260 AM

Programming
- Format: Christian Talk in Spanish

Ownership
- Owner: Iglesia Vida y Esperanza de Greenville, South Carolina

History
- First air date: 1948
- Former call signs: WMUU (1948–2008)

Technical information
- Licensing authority: FCC
- Facility ID: 73297
- Class: D
- Power: 5,000 watts daytime 15 watts night
- Transmitter coordinates: 34°54′30″N 82°20′41″W

Links
- Public license information: Public file; LMS
- Website: http://www.radiovida1260.com

WPJF (1260 AM) is Christian Talk in Spanish radio station licensed to Greenville, South Carolina, United States, it serves the Upstate South Carolina area. The outlet is licensed by the Federal Communications Commission (FCC) to broadcast at 1260 kHz with 5,000 watts of power daytime and 15 watts at night. It first began broadcasting in 1948. The station is currently owned by Iglesia Vida y Esperanza de Greenville, South Carolina.

== History ==
1260 AM signed on under the ownership of Bob Jones University in May 1948 and signed on officially on September 15, 1949, as a venue for sacred and classical music, dramatic readings, and gospel preaching. The call letters stand for "World's Most Unusual University," a now-abandoned promotional slogan of BJU. Bob Jones, Sr. intended for the station to operate independently, accepting advertising rather than being supported by the university, but he did not expect the station to make a profit.

The AM station eventually increased its power from 1,000 to 5,000 watts in the early 1960s. Bob Jones University eventually shifted the majority of its sacred and classical music to WMUU-FM, using the AM station for preaching and some religious music.

This practice continued until the university sold the station to Comunidad Cristiana International in early 2008. It then became a Spanish Religious station under the name "Radio Luz." The station went silent in early 2011 due to financial troubles.

On October 1, 2012, the station's license was assigned to Iglesia Nueva Vida of High Point for a purchase price of $200,000. On May 17, 2018, the station was sold to Iglesia Vida y Esperanza de Greenville, South Carolina, for $480,000.
