= WNUE-FM =

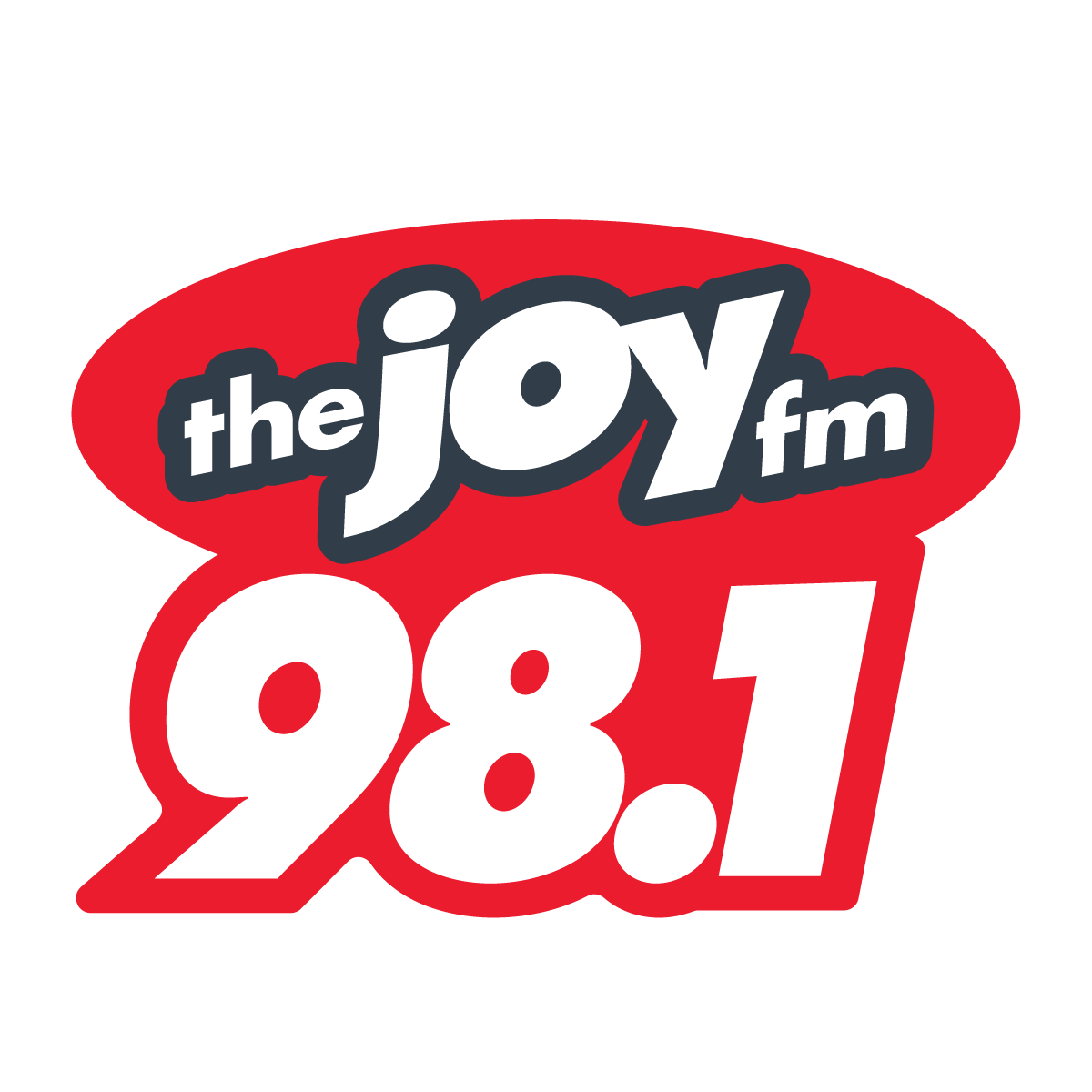
- Deltona, Florida; United States
- Broadcast area: Greater Orlando - Daytona Beach - Space Coast
- Frequency: 98.1 MHz (HD Radio)
- Branding: The JOY FM 98.1

Programming
- Format: Christian AC
- Subchannels: HD2: Christian worship HD3: Christian hip hop

Ownership
- Owner: Radio Training Network, Inc.

History
- First air date: September 1968 (as WRMF-FM at 98.3)
- Former call signs: WRMF-FM (1968–1979); WAJX (1979–1986); WSCF (1986–1989); WGNE-FM (1989–2000)
- Former frequencies: 98.3 MHz (1968–1990)

Technical information
- Licensing authority: FCC
- Facility ID: 46969
- Class: C2
- ERP: 50,000 watts
- HAAT: 145 metres (476 ft)
- Transmitter coordinates: 28°51′10.3″N 81°04′2.6″W

Links
- Public license information: Public file; LMS
- Webcast: Listen Live
- Website: florida.thejoyfm.com

WNUE-FM (98.1 MHz, "The JOY FM") is a listener-supported, non-commercial radio station broadcasting a Christian AC radio format. Licensed to Deltona, Florida, it serves the Greater Orlando metropolitan area, Daytona Beach and the Space Coast. The station is owned by the Radio Training Network.

WNUE-FM has an effective radiated power (ERP) of 50,000 watts. The transmitter is on Pell Road in Farmton, Florida.

== History ==
=== WRMF-FM ===
The station signed on in September 1968 as WRMF-FM. It originally was licensed to Titusville and it broadcast on 98.3 with only 3,000 watts, a fraction of its current output. Its original owner was WRMF, Inc., which also owned WRMF 1060 AM (now WIXC). The two stations simulcast a Soft AC format. In 1972, WRMF-AM-FM switched to a Middle of the Road (MOR) format. Then in 1979, WRMF-AM-FM changed to a Beautiful Music format. However, the beautiful music sound was short-lived.

Later that year, WRMF-FM flipped to Album-oriented rock (AOR) under the new call sign WAJX, while the AM station continued programming an easy listening sound. In 1986, WAJX flipped to Adult Top 40 under the new call sign WSCF.

=== Country Music ===
In 1989, WSCF changed the call sign again to WGNE-FM and flipped to Country music as the "Great 98". A year later the station was sold to Sage Broadcasting and was moved to 98.1 in the process, along with a boost in power.

In 1991, WGNE-FM was sold again to SBC Technologies, Inc., which sold WGNE once again to Southern Starr, LP for $3.5 million. In 1993, WGNE was again sold to Robert F.X. Silverman. Around this time WGNE rebranded as "98 Frog". (Many country stations around the U.S. were using the "Frog" branding at that time.)

In 1996, WGNE was sold to SFX Broadcasting, which sold it back to Southern Starr a year later. In 1998, Capstar bought WGNE. Capstar was absorbed into Clear Channel Communications that same year. In 2000, WGNE was sold to Mega Communications. On June 28, 2000, Mega moved the country format to 99.9 in the Jacksonville radio market, now WGNE-FM Middleburg, Florida.

=== Spanish Contemporary ===
After the country format moved to 99.9, WGNE changed its call letters to WNUE-FM, and flipped to Spanish language Contemporary Hits/CHR as "Mega 98.1". WNUE was sold to Entravision Communications, for $23.75 million in 2007.

On December 1, 2010, WNUE flipped to Spanish adult hits as Jose FM 98.1. On May 17, 2012, WNUE changed the format again, this time to Salsa music, branded as "Salsa 98.1".

=== Radio Training Network ===
On April 16, 2021, Entravision announced that the station would be sold, with the new owner to assume operations under a local marketing agreement (LMA) on April 19. Radio Training Network announced that it would acquire the station for $4 million, to run its Christian adult contemporary network The JOY FM. The sale closed on July 13, 2021.
