= Christian contemporary hit radio =

Radio format

Christian contemporary hit radio (sometimes abbreviated as Christian CHR, also known as contemporary Christian hits, Christian hit list, current Christian hits, Christian hit music, Christian top 40, or Christian pop radio) is a radio format, common in many countries (mainly in the United States, Canada, the United Kingdom, Ireland, Australia, and New Zealand), that focuses on playing current and recent music as determined by the contemporary Christian music Top 40. There are several subcategories, dominantly focusing on Christian rock, Christian pop, or urban gospel music. Used alone, Christian CHR most often refers to the Christian CHR-pop format. The term Christian hit radio was coined in the early 1980s by CCM Magazine (shortly after the term contemporary hit radio was coined by Radio & Records magazine) to designate Christian Top 40 stations which continued to play hits from all Christian music genres as contemporary Christian music splintered into Christian adult contemporary, Urban contemporary gospel and other formats.

The term "Christian top 40" is also used to refer to the actual list of hit songs, and, by extension, to refer to contemporary Christian music in general.

== Variations ==
=== Christian CHR ===
Also known as Christian CHR/pop or Christian teen CHR. Plays Christian pop, and Christian dance, and sometimes urban gospel, Christian alternative, Christian rock, and Christian country crossover as well. Often referred as "Christian Top 40"; in terms of incorporating a variety of genres of Christian music, Christian CHR/pop is the successor to the original concept of Christian top 40 radio which originated in the 1960s.

=== Christian adult CHR ===
These stations typically are hybrids of the contemporary Christian hit radio (CHR/pop) and Christian hot AC formats. This format contains a strong focus on current Christian charts, contemporary and recurrent Christian hits as well as placing a minority of older, classic Christian hits from the 2000s and early to mid 2010s onto the playlist. Christian adult CHR stations play pop-friendly Christian rhythmic, Christian dance and Christian hip hop titles alongside standard Christian pop and pop rock fare, and often shying away from the most rhythmic Christian CHR titles until they are established hits on the format.

=== Christian rhythmic CHR ===
Also known as Christian CHR/rhythmic, or Christian CHR/urban. These stations focus on Christian hip hop and Christian dance-pop. There are differences between Christian CHR/rhythmic and the urban contemporary gospel format; urban gospel stations will often play Christian R&B and gospel songs that Christian CHR/rhythmic stations will not, and Christian CHR/rhythmic stations, despite playlists heavy with urban gospel product, sometimes have white disc jockeys and will include CEDM and rhythmic Christian pop music that urban gospel outlets will not.

=== Bilingual Christian CHR ===
Bilingual Spanish Christian CHRs combine current and recent Christian and rhythmic CHR hits with recent Latin Christian pop hits, targeting young Latina listeners. Similarly, bilingual French Christian CHRs are common in some Canadian markets, and combine anglophone and French Christian pop hits. Filipino-based Christian CHR stations are also common in major Philippine market areas, which feature current Christian and rhythmic CHR hits with recent Christian OPM and P-Pop hits.

=== Gold-based Christian CHR ===
Gold-based Christian CHRs combine a more limited base of currents and recurrents from the Christian, rhythmic and/or adult CHR formats with a broader playlist of gold from the 2000s and 2010s. Similar to gold-based mainstream CHR, stations from this format may also be called Christian rhythmic hot AC if their library is particularly rhythmic-leaning.

=== Christian CHR/dance ===
Playing Christian dance remixes of popular Christian songs with perhaps current Christian hits from the dance charts. As with pure mainstream dance-music radio stations (as opposed to CHR/rhythmic and rhythmic AC formats), pure Christian dance-music radio stations (as opposed to Christian CHR/rhythmic and Christian rhythmic AC formats) are not very common but tend to have loyal audiences in the markets where they do exist.

=== Christian CHR/rock ===
Stations with this format, a modernized Christian Rock 40 format, are similar in some ways to the Christian Adult CHR and Christian CHR/pop formats, but also incorporate Christian modern rock/Christian alternative/Christian active rock and Christian modern AC titles in an upbeat presentation.

=== Other variations ===
There are also variations targeting minority ethnic groups, such as Christian CHR/español (Latin Christian pop), and Christian CHR/Tejano (Christian Tex-Mex and Tejano) which are commonly found in Arizona, Texas, California, and Mexico.

== Countdowns, shows and personalities ==
- Weekend 22

== Formats and radio stations ==
- Air1 (1995-2019)
- K-Love Pop! (Note: Available on the HD2 subchannels of KYLA, KAIV, WYPA, WARW, WLTE and KVLR and the HD3 subchannels of WKVV, KLTU, KJLV, WAKL, WRCM, WKVR and KLVH.)
- KADI-FM
- KJTM-LP
- KOAY
- KPUL
- WJLZ
- WUFM
- WYSZ
- WYQQ
- His Radio Z

== See also ==
- Contemporary hit radio
