= WAFJ =

Radio station in South Carolina, USA

Coordinates: 33.408°N 81.843°W

WAFJ and WBIJ
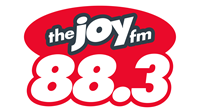

WAFJ: Belvedere, South Carolina; WBIJ: Saluda, South Carolina; United States
- Broadcast area: Augusta metropolitan area
- Frequencies: WAFJ: 88.3 MHz (HD Radio); WBIJ: 88.7 MHz
- Branding: WAFJ: 88.3 The Joy FM; WBIJ: Joy Worship

Programming
- Format: WAFJ: Christian contemporary; WBIJ: Contemporary worship
- Subchannels: WAFJ: HD2: WBIJ simulcast; HD3: LF Radio

Ownership
- Owner: Radio Training Network

History
- First air date: WAFJ: 1994
- Call sign meaning: WAFJ: Winning Augusta For Jesus

Technical information
- Licensing authority: FCC
- Class: WAFJ: C2; WBIJ: C1
- ERP: WAFJ: 4,500 watts; WBIJ: 130 watts (horiz.); 51,000 watts (vert.)
- HAAT: WAFJ: 423 meters (1,388 ft); WBIJ: 120 meters (390 ft)
- Translator(s): WBIJ: 101.9 W270CY (Augusta)
- Repeater(s): WAFJ: 93.3 WZAE (Wadley)

Links
- Website: thejoyfm.com

WAFJ (88.3 FM) and WBIJ (88.7 FM) are non-commercial radio stations serving the Augusta metropolitan area, owned by Radio Training Network (RTN). WAFJ is licensed to Belvedere, South Carolina and plays contemporary Christian music. WBIJ is licensed to Saluda, South Carolina and plays modern worship music. The radio studios and offices were located on LeCompte Avenue in North Augusta, South Carolina.

The stations are listener supported and depends on contributions for operating funding.

== Translators ==
In addition to WAFJ and WBIJ, the stations utilize FM translators to get in to smaller towns across Georgia.

Call sign	Frequency	City of license	FID	ERP (W)	Class	FCC info
WZAE	93.3 FM	Wadley, Georgia	170969	4,000	A	LMS
W224BE	92.7 FM	Sylvania, Georgia	156922	27	D	LMS

== See also ==
- Media in Augusta, Georgia
