= WLFJ-FM =

Radio station in Greenville, South Carolina

- Greenville, South Carolina; United States
- Broadcast area: Greenville-Spartanburg area
- Frequency: 89.3 MHz (HD Radio)
- Branding: His Radio 89.3

Programming
- Format: Christian radio
- Subchannels: HD2: His Radio Z (Christian CHR); HD3: His Radio Praise (Contemporary worship music); HD4: Classic His Radio (Christian classic hits)

Ownership
- Owner: Radio Training Network
- Sister stations: WHRT-FM, WRTP, WALC, WLFS, WSHP-FM

History
- First air date: May 1983; 42 years ago
- Call sign meaning: With Love From Jesus

Technical information
- Licensing authority: FCC
- Facility ID: 54856
- Class: C1
- ERP: 41,000 watts (horizontal); 37,000 watts (vertical)
- HAAT: 335 meters (1099 ft)
- Transmitter coordinates: 34°56′26.00″N 82°24′44.00″W

Links
- Public license information: Public file; LMS
- Webcast: Listen Live
- Website: Official His Radio Website; His Radio - Greenville Website

WLFJ-FM (89.3 MHz) is a non-commercial radio station, licensed to Greenville, South Carolina, and serving the Upstate, including Spartanburg, Anderson and Clemson. Owned by the Radio Training Network, it broadcasts a Contemporary Christian music (primarily Christian AC) format, known as "His Radio 89.3." Several Christian talk and teaching shows are also included in the weekday schedule, hosted by Jim Daly, David Jeremiah and Charles Stanley.

WLFJ-FM has an effective radiated power (ERP) of 41,000 watts (horizontal) and 37,000 watts (vertical). The transmitter is on Tower Road in Travelers Rest, South Carolina.

== HD Radio ==
WLFJ-FM broadcasts in the HD Radio format.

- HD2 carries His Radio Z, a youth-oriented Christian CHR format; it is syndicated from the First Baptist Church of Spartanburg's WHRZ-LP.
- HD3 carries His Radio Praise, a contemporary worship music format. It is also available on FM via 103.9 WSHP-FM Easley and 89.7 W209CM-Simpsonville. The main channel simulcasts His Radio Praise from 8 am to 12 noon on Sunday mornings.
- HD4 carries Classic His Radio, which airs a classic CCM format. It is available on FM via 91.9 WHRT-FM Cokesbury, and the translator 92.9 W225AZ. Under a local marketing agreement, was formerly heard on iHeartMedia's daytimer WLFJ 660 AM, but this arrangement ended in August 2019. Until April 15, 2023, the subchannel carried His Radio Talk, which aired Christian talk and teaching programming.

== Translators ==
In addition to the main station, WLFJ-FM is simulcast on 105.1 WGFJ in Cross Hill, South Carolina, which serves the western portion of the Upstate. It also operates 9 FM translators that bring the main signal or one of its HD channels into portions of the Atlanta, Asheville and Charlotte radio markets.

Call sign	Frequency	City of license	FID	ERP (W)	Class	FCC info
W266AH	101.1 FM	Athens, Georgia	151764	10	D	LMS
W219DJ	91.7 FM	Toccoa, Georgia	90957	10	D	LMS
W231AR	94.1 FM	Black Mountain, North Carolina	147523	10	D	LMS
W238BO	95.5 FM	Black Mountain, North Carolina	147605	10	D	LMS
W215AZ	90.9 FM	Boone, North Carolina	91550	10	D	LMS
W279AI	103.7 FM	Hendersonville, North Carolina	85035	10	D	LMS
W271BS	102.1 FM	Greenville, South Carolina	156073	99	D	LMS
W209CM	89.7 FM	Simpsonville, South Carolina	121232	210	D	LMS
W238AW	95.5 FM	West View, South Carolina	142981	250	D	LMS

Additionally, 91.3 WLFA in Asheville, North Carolina; 92.1 WCFJ in Columbia, South Carolina, and 88.5 WRTP in Raleigh, North Carolina, call themselves "His Radio" and air many of the same programs as WLFJ.
