= Radio Training Network =

American radio broadcasting company

Radio Training Network, Inc. is an American non-profit broadcasting organization that operates several networks of Christian radio-formatted stations, mostly in the Southeast. The network's footprint includes stations in Alabama, Florida, Georgia, Missouri, North Carolina and South Carolina. The network is based in Port Richey, Florida. Some stations are programmed as "The Joy FM", and several are known as "His Radio".

== History ==
In May 1976, Jim and Ruth Campbell took over the management and programming of WCIE 91.3 FM, a non-commercial station in Lakeland, Florida, which was owned by the Evangel Christian School. The station quickly became a financial success, raising more than enough listener support to keep it on the air. (The station later moved to 91.1 MHz and is now WKES, owned by the Moody Bible Institute.)

The ministry expanded outside of Lakeland with the construction of its second and third stations, WLFJ-FM in Greenville, South Carolina, and WJIS in Bradenton, Florida, which began in 1983 and 1986. Radio Training Network was formed in 1989 to purchase these stations from the Evangel Christian School amidst strife within the involved church, with the aid of Bill Watkins, who underwrote the transaction.

The 1990s saw several new stations join RTN. In 1991, RTN acquired the former WSRX of Fort Myers, and relaunched it as WJYO. However, the Fort Myers station was sold two years later to Toccoa Falls College. It was essentially traded for a frequency held by the college in Belvedere, near Augusta, Georgia.

A return to the Tampa Bay area was foreshadowed in 1995 with the purchase of WLPJ in New Port Richey. That station is now known as WCIE and considered the company flagship. In the 2010s, RTN acquisitions included an upgrade from a translator to a full-power station in the Columbia, South Carolina area; a station in Gainesville, Florida; and a lease agreement that allowed RTN to enter the Jacksonville market.

In 1995, RTN made its first expansion outside of the Southeast when it purchased and relaunched KWND "The Wind" in Springfield, Missouri. The network would double its holdings in the market when it acquired KWFC (89.1 FM) in 2014.

RTN has expanded in several of its longtime markets with the addition of further Christian formats beyond Christian adult contemporary. In 2019, the former WTOB-FM in the Greenville area was purchased and became WSHP-FM "His Radio Praise", airing contemporary worship music.

RTN entered Orlando on April 19, 2021, with the launch of The Joy FM on WNUE-FM 98.1, which the organization concurrently filed to buy from Entravision Communications for $4 million. The next month, RTN reached a deal to purchase stations serving Tallahassee (WTSM) and Port St. Lucie (WHLG) from Horizon Broadcasting Company for $1.3 million.

== Stations ==
RTN groups its stations by region. For more information on the relevant stations, see the main article page and the supplemental pages for applicable individual stations.

=== The Joy FM ===
The Joy FM banner covers RTN's stations in Florida, most of Georgia, Alabama, and Tennessee. The Joy FM stations maintain studios in Sarasota, Gainesville and Port Richey, Florida; Tyrone, Georgia; and Dothan, Alabama.

=== His Radio ===
His Radio stations are found in the Carolinas and in eastern Georgia, with the exception of the Augusta area.
