= GoDurham =

Transit district in Durham, North Carolina, U.S.

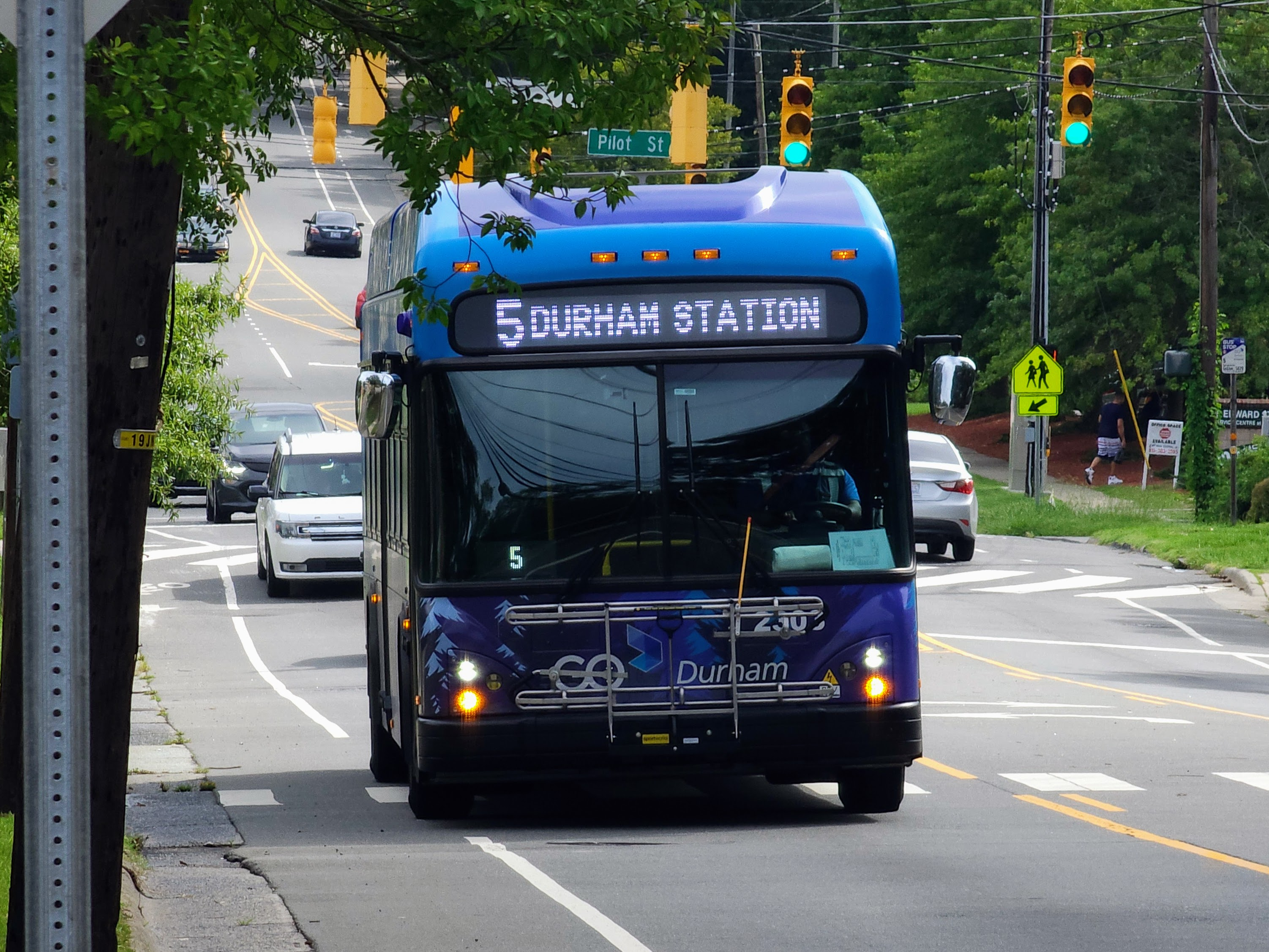
- GoDurham's [2301] operating on Route 5
- Formerly: Durham Area Transit Authority
- Founded: January 1991
- Headquarters: 1907 Fay St, Durham, NC 27704
- Locale: Durham, North Carolina
- Service type: bus service, paratransit
- Alliance: GoTriangle
- Routes: 16
- Hubs: Durham Station Transportation Center
- Fleet: 77
- Daily ridership: 19,200 (weekdays, Q2 2026)
- Annual ridership: 6,741,500 (2025)
- Fuel type: Diesel, Hybrid, & Electric
- Operator: RATP Dev
- Website: godurhamtransit.org

GoDurham, formerly Durham Area Transit Authority (DATA), is the public transit system serving Durham, North Carolina. It is currently operated by RATP Dev, managed by GoTriangle, and funded by the City of Durham. It was renamed under the consolidated GoTransit branding scheme for the Research Triangle region. In 2025, the system had a ridership of 6,741,500, or about 19,200 per weekday as of the second quarter of 2026.

== History ==
=== Early years ===
The City of Durham assumed the operation of the local Duke Power bus system in January 1991, naming it Durham Area Transit Authority (DATA).

- 1891–1902 – Durham Street Railway Co.
- 1902–1913 – Durham Traction Co.
- 1913–1921 – Durham Traction Co. (Cities Service Co.)
- 1921–1943 – Durham Public Service Co. (Cities Service Co.)
- 1930 – streetcars discontinued
- After 1943 – Duke Power Company

=== 2000s & 2010s ===
==== DATA Upgrades ====
To benefit riders and to replace aging equipment, DATA purchased 31 new Gillig Low Floors in 2002. The first bus arrived on April 16, 2003. The next day on April 17, the bus ran in revenue service on Route 7. The first bus ran through all routes, fare-free. These buses included LED destination signs, longer 40-foot buses, and automated announcements.

==== Service Expansions ====
In 2005, DATA collaborated and funded with Capital Area Transit (now GoRaleigh) and Triangle Transit Authority (now GoTriangle) to create a route connecting the DATA Downtown Terminal with the Brier Creek Shopping Center in Raleigh. The new route, designated 15, began in November 2005.

The downtown terminal, located at Great Jones St and W Main St, was relocated to a new transportation center, named Durham Station. This also serves the GoTriangle and Greyhound Lines buses on February 22, 2009. It later served Megabus and FlixBus. The building was designed by the Freelon group. Triangle Transit merged operations with DATA in 2010. As a result, Triangle Transit (now GoTriangle) handled management, planning, and marketing for the transit company. In 2011, DATA, along with GoTriangle began the Designing Better Bus Service project, a project offering the following improvements:

- Better on-time performance.
- Revamped routes, with new alignments and variants.
- Improved bus stops.

These revamped routes debuted in two phases. Phase One, which affected routes 1 (became 1/1A/1B/1N), 6 (became 6/6B), and 11 (became 11/11B) began on September 29, 2012. Phase 2, affecting the rest of the routes began on January 9, 2013.

==== DATA to GoDurham ====
In 2015, as part of the GoTransit naming scheme, DATA was renamed GoDurham. Total ridership, for the fiscal year 2015 was almost 6.3 million ridership. To improve service, GoTriangle introduced GoDurham's Short-Range Transit Plan in April 2019. This plan intended to speed up service while the original 2017 and current revision of the Durham Transit Plan were being done. These improvements were:

- Further improve on-timer performance
- Simplify routes, removing variations to make them easier.
- Introduce micro-transit on select areas.
- Improve frequencies to reduce wait times, introducing the Frequent Service Network program.
- Add more crosstown routes to connect to more places.

They offered the changes GoDurham can in the upcoming years. The plan was done by late 2019 and by January 2020, the new routes began running service. However, the implementation of the plan was slowed and eventually halted due to the COVID-19 pandemic.

=== 2020s ===
==== COVID-19 Pandemic ====
During the pandemic, GoDurham service ran normally until March 20. Service was reduced, as service was scheduled to end at 9:30 pm, similar to Sundays. On March 22, fare collections were suspended, and rear-door boarding was allowed. However, on March 30, GoDurham severely reduced service as operators start to drop. The following service changes included reductions of service to hourly or every 2 hours.

In April, bus capacity was reduced to 16 passengers max. Seats were taped off from buses to prioritize social distancing. However, in May, they reduced service to a modified Sunday schedule. This took effect on May 4. This was short-lived as on May 18, some service was restored. By June 29, GoDurham restored all bus service back to pre-COVID service patterns. In October 2020, GoDurham expanded service with the Short-Range Transit Plan, adding 15-minute service to Fayetteville St and adding better weekday evening and weekend service to various routes.

==== Restoration ====
On June 29, 2021, service was reduced due to another operator shortage. The following service reductions included, reversing the improvements and suspending certain routes. However, in late 2021, GoDurham slowly restoring service again, adding the 5K and 10B routes back.

2022 brought more restorations. To provide lost service to Croasdaile Crossings previously served by the 1 route, on February 1, 2022, route 6 service was extended to serve Croasdaile Crossings during weekday daytime hours. Major restorations occurred on October 28, when GoDurham restored 15-minute service, discontinuing the 5K route again, minor changes to the 11/11B routes, and restoring the 12B route, servicing RTC.

2023 saw most service return to pre-COVID levels. On February 13, full service returned on route 7. On June 24, routes 2, 8, 11/11B were restored to full frequencies and service. In October, GoDurham plans to get full service restored by early 2024. On November 11, routes 1 and 4 will have restored overnight service, Frequent Service Network on route 5 will be active on Saturdays, and 10/10B will have expanded service. Service was restored to January 2020 levels with the service changes on routes 1/6/12/12B on January 27th, 2024. Route 1 was interlined with route 6, route 6 was restored to 30 minute frequencies, and 12/12B service runs to Saturday.

==== Service Expansions ====
After restoring service, GoDurham started to improve existing service with the April 27th service changes, that focused that every route would see 30-minute service. This saw routes 9A/9B and 12B have overnight/Sunday hours and increased night/Sunday frequencies to 30-minutes on routes 6, 7, and 8.

North Durham saw improvements on August 2024, which affected routes 1, 4, 6, and 9. Changes include Route 1 being partially extended to Riverside High School and route 4 being extended to Tom Wilkinson Road. Route 6 is extended past Duke/VA, bringing a new crosstown connection, serving Horton Road and Danube Lane, and route 9 being shortened to Duke Regional Hospital. All routes run every 30-minutes all day.

East and South Durham saw improvements around August to November 2025, which affects routes 3/3B/3C, 5, 8, and 12/12B. Changes include frequency increases on routes 3 and 16 (renamed from 3B), route 5 extending to service NC-54, route 8 extending to serve NC-55, route 12 being shortened to NC-54 and Alston Avenue with route 12B being eliminated, and a new crosstown route connecting Durham Tech, NCCU, and The Village. Improvements on routes 3 and 16 will see Holloway St have a bus arrive better than 15-minutes until 7 pm weekdays, which is a first for GoDurham's history. However, this was since been on hold until further notice.

In May of 2026, route 4 was added to the high frequency network, with the addition of a new route 4B to provide every 15-minute service between Durham Station and Seven Oaks Road, while route 4 continued to end at Northern High School. Route 4B ran between 2pm and 7pm on weekdays until August, when it was extended to all day Monday - Saturday to make route 4 continually every 15 minutes.

== Fares & Service Hours ==
GoDurham is currently fare-free through June 2027.

Fare Type	Single-Way	1 Day Pass	5 Day Pass	7 Day Pass	31 Day Pass
Standard	$1.00	$2.00	$8.50	$12.00	$36.00
Discount	$0.50	$1.00	$4.25	$6.00	$18.00
Student	Free with a GoPass				
Seniors	Free without ID				

GoDurham currently runs in three service patterns. Weekday daytime hours which run from 5:30 am to 7:00 pm, weekday evening hours which runs from 7:00 pm to 12:30 am, and Sundays which runs from 6:30 am to 9:30 pm Sunday-level service is also operated during New Years, MLK Jr. Day, Memorial Day, Independence Day, Labor Day, and Thanksgiving Day. There is no service on Christmas Day. Service operates normally on Christmas Eve; however, service ends after 7:30 pm.

== Fleet ==
=== Color Schemes ===
History

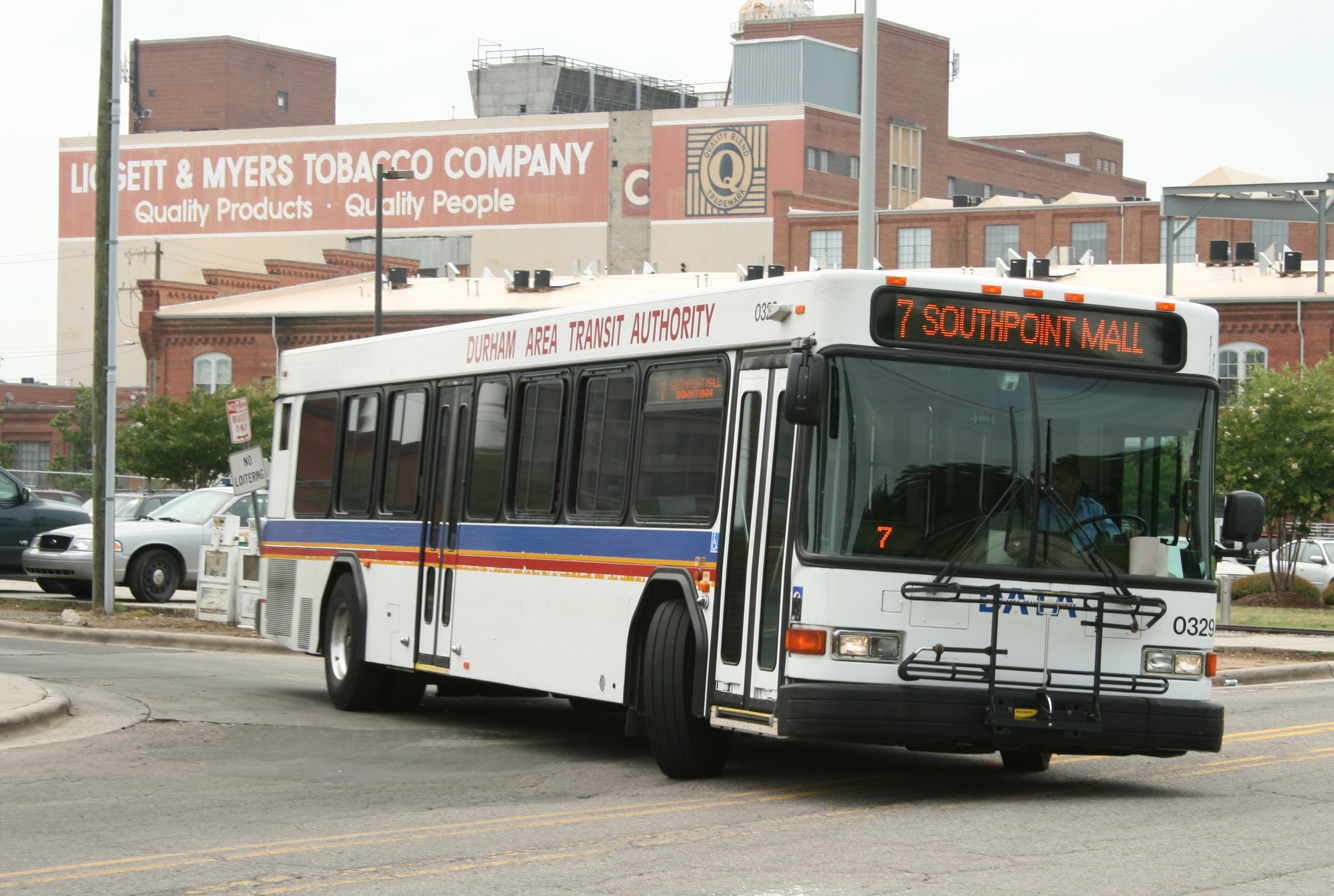
DATA "stripe" livery from 2003 to 2009

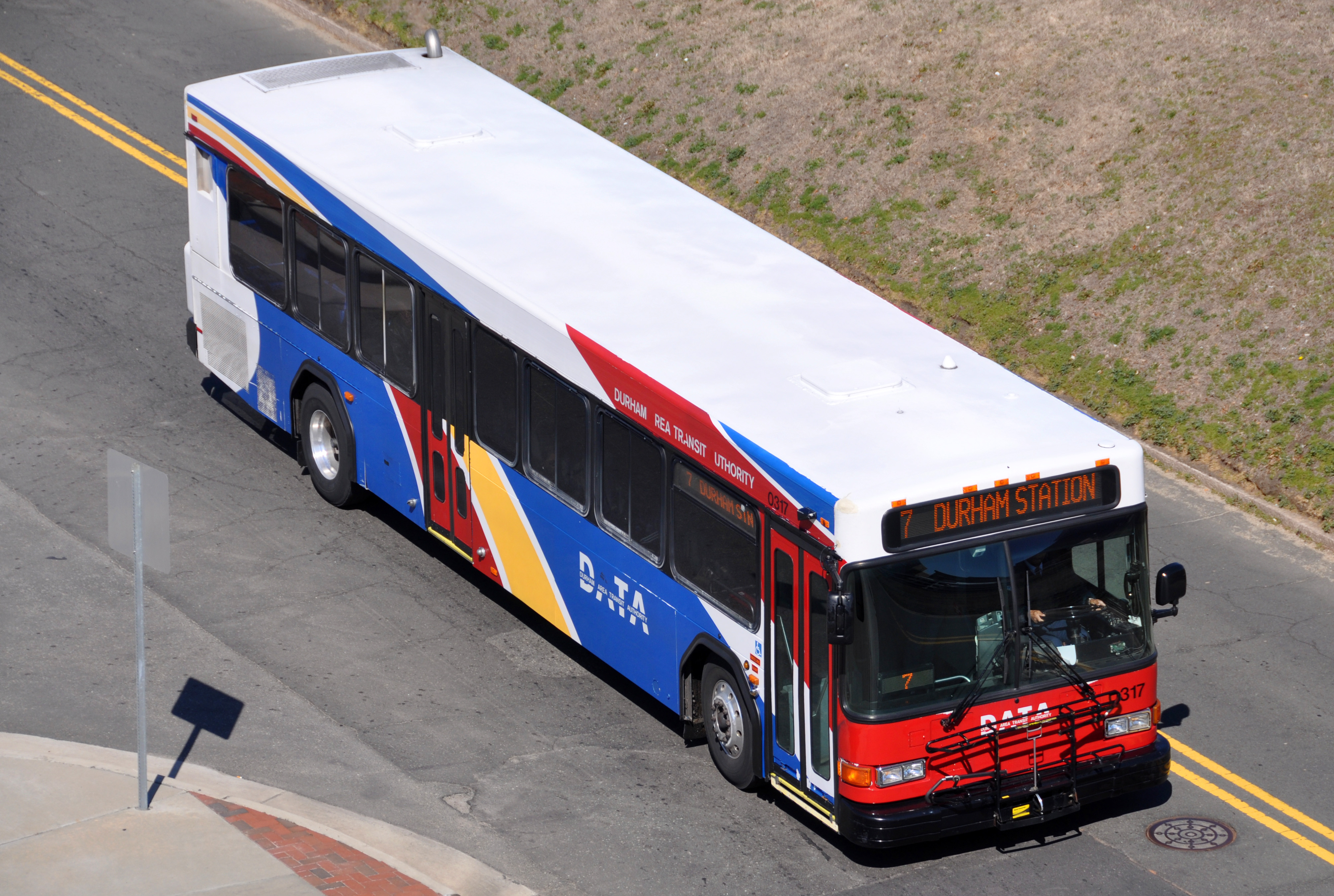
DATA "color-arc" livery from 2009 to 2016

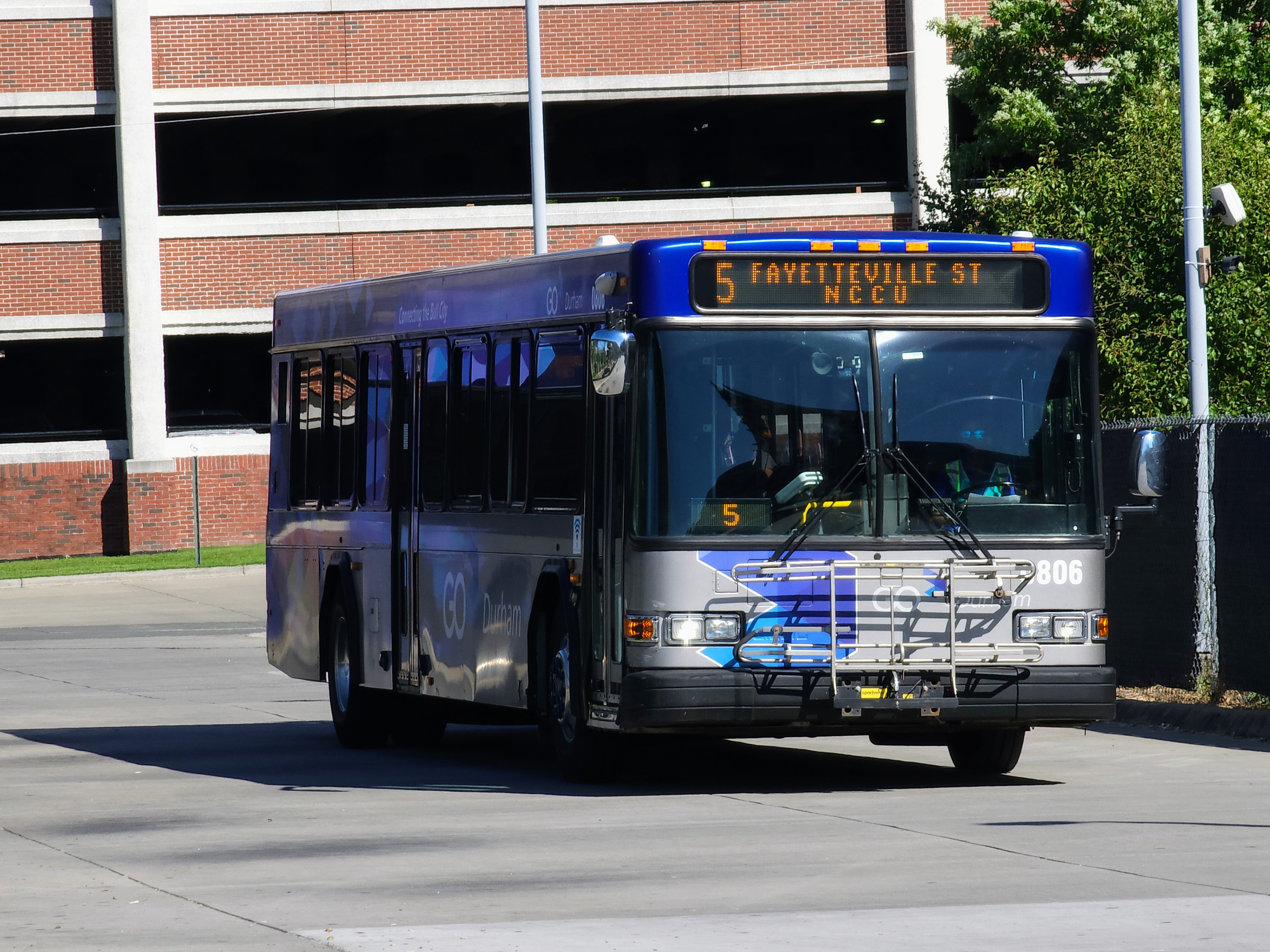
Current GoDurham Livery

GoDurham Electric Wrap

The fleet livery changed throughout the years. The first ever livery, prior to 2003, had buses utilized blue stripes over a white body. However, with the introduction of Gillig Low Floors in 2003, buses used a white body with red, yellow, and blue stripes.

In 2010 with the delivery of new Gillig BRT Hybrids, a new livery was created, which featured a brighter color, arc scheme on the buses. As the result of the transition to GoDurham, the livery was changed into a gray body with blue triangles in different hues. Retrofitted buses, which are the buses before the rebranding retain the black trim. All buses delivered after 2017 lack any black trim. The slogan used for the buses was changed to Connecting the Bull City.

In 2021, a new wrap livery was adopted for the electric buses in the fleet, featuring a blue base with silhouettes of trees and Durham landmarks, such as the Lucky Strike water tower, the skyline, and a bull. This wrap was also applied to the 2023 electric buses, however, the 2025 EVs have remained unwrapped in the standard GoDurham livery.

=== Current fleet ===
GoDurham's fixed-route service currently operates 77 vehicles, running on 17 routes. GoDurham currently operates Gillig Low Floor, Gillig BRT, and Gillig Low Floor Plus buses. They currently run diesel, hybrid and electric buses. As part of the clean-energy program, 20 Gillig BRT Hybrids were delivered to the city in 2009–2010. Bicycle racks are fitted to the front of all buses to increase efforts for public transit. All buses are equipped with Wi-Fi on board. USB ports were introduced with the 2018-2019 units. In 2019, GoDurham placed an order for six electric buses. Two of these buses were delivered on Earth Day 2021. The rest of the fleet arrived in 2023, to replace aging units. Further, in February 2024 it was announced that 18 more electric buses are to be received in the following two years. The 2023 Gillig electric units now feature next stop information screens. This is the current fleet as of September 2026.

Image	Year	Bus Name	Fleet numbers	Notes
GoDurham #0802 on route 3.	2008	Gillig; Low Floor 40' Diesel	801-806; Total: 6 units	Delivered in July 2008; Refurbished and repowered in FY 2016-2017; 0801, 0802 retired
2010 Gillig BRT HEV running on Route 10	2010	Gillig; BRT HEV 40'	1001-1020, 1201-1204 Total: 23 units	Delivered in July 2010 and 2012; Repowered in 2018, refurbished in 2021.; 1001, 1005, 1007-1011, 1015, 1017, 1020, and 1203 retired.
2012 Gillig BRT HEV running on Route 4	2010	Gillig; BRT HEV 40'	1001-1020, 1201-1204 Total: 23 units	Delivered in July 2010 and 2012; Repowered in 2018, refurbished in 2021.; 1001, 1005, 1007-1011, 1015, 1017, 1020, and 1203 retired.
2012 Gillig BRT HEV running on Route 4	2012	Gillig; BRT HEV 40'	1001-1020, 1201-1204 Total: 23 units	Delivered in July 2010 and 2012; Repowered in 2018, refurbished in 2021.; 1001, 1005, 1007-1011, 1015, 1017, 1020, and 1203 retired.
2017 Gillig Low Floor#1710	2017	Gillig; Low Floor 40' Diesel	1701-1712; Total: 12 units	Delivered by August 2017; Ordered for fleet expansion and replacement
GoDurham #1902 operating on the 5 route.	2018	Gillig; Low Floor 40' Diesel	1801-1803, 1901-1904; Total: 7 units	Delivered between April 2018 and July 2019; Ordered for fleet replacement; 2018s feature Allison transmissions, 2019s feature Voiths
GoDurham #1902 operating on the 5 route.	2019	Gillig; Low Floor 40' Diesel	1801-1803, 1901-1904; Total: 7 units	Delivered between April 2018 and July 2019; Ordered for fleet replacement; 2018s feature Allison transmissions, 2019s feature Voiths
2021 Gillig Low Floor#2103	2021	Gillig; Low Floor 40' Diesel	2103-2110; Total: 8 units	Delivered January 2022; Ordered for fleet expansion
2021 Gillig Low Floor+ EV#2102	2021	Gillig; Low Floor Plus EV 40'	2101-2102; Total: 2 units	Delivered Earth Day 2021; Durham's first-ever electric bus fleet.
2021 Gillig Low Floor+ EV#2102	2021	Gillig; Low Floor Plus EV 40'	2101-2102; Total: 2 units	Delivered Earth Day 2021; Durham's first-ever electric bus fleet.
2023 Gillig Low Floor+ EV#2304	2023	Gillig; Low Floor Plus EV 40'	2301-2306; Total: 6 units	Second batch of electric buses ordered by GoDurham; Delivered in September 2023.; 2305 retired due to fire.
	2025	Gillig; Low Floor Plus EV 40'	2501-2515 Total: 15 units	Third batch of electric buses ordered by GoDurham.; Entered service in January 2026.
	2009	Gillig BRT 40’ Diesel	2601-2608	Ordered secondhand from Transit Sales International; Refurbished in 2026; Ex-Tri Delta Transit
	2009	Gillig BRT 40’ Diesel	2609	Ordered secondhand from Transit Sales International; Refurbished in 2026; Ex-Utah Transit Authority #09015
	2010	Gillig Low Floor 40’ Diesel	2610	Ordered secondhand from Transit Sales International; Refurbished in 2026; Ex-Cache Valley Transit District #1162

=== Retired Fleet ===
Image	Year	Bus Model	Fleet numbers	Notes
N/A	1992	OBI; Orion I (01.507)	9201-9232 (32 units)	The first buses were purchased by DATA in 1992 to replace old Duke Power Company units.; Originally numbered 101–131.; Retired in 2007
N/A	2000 2001	Gillig; Phantom 30' Diesel	0001-0008 0101-0103 (11 units)	Replaced some Orion I's; Mainly ran until 2009, and remained in reserve until 2011.; Retired in 2011
	2003	Gillig; Low Floor 40' Diesel	0301-0331 (31 units)	Replaced all Orion I's. Repowered from DD50 to Cummins ISL, refurbished in 2010; Lacked GoDurham scheme; Retired in 2022
	2005	Gillig; Low Floor 40' Diesel	0501 (1 unit)	Sole 2005 unit. Refurbished at an unknown year.; Received GoDurham scheme; Retired in 2020 or 2021

== Routes ==
=== Current Routes ===
Here is the list of routes in the current system as of March 2025. All routes depart from Durham Station. Refer to the GoDurham site for more information. Most routes run every 30 to 60 minutes. Select routes run under the Frequent Service Network program, which provides 15-minute service during daytime hours and 30 minute service during evening, Sundays, and Holidays.

Route	Terminal		Areas Served	Notes
1	Durham Station	Horton Rd; Guess Rd	Northgate - N. Pointe Drive - Guess Road	Extended to Riverside High School until weekdays at 7 pm
2	Durham Station	Brier Creek Shopping Center	E. Main St - Angier Avenue - Brier Creek	Frequent Service Network via Main Street from Durham Station to Alston
3	Durham Station	Glenview Station; Walmart	Holloway St - The Village	Frequent Service Network via Holloway Street from Durham Station to The Village/Glenview Stn
4	Durham Station	Tom Wilkinson Road	N. Roxboro St - Duke Regional - Riverview	Serves Northern High School
5	Durham Station	The Streets at Southpoint	Fayetteville St - NCCU - NC-54	Frequent Service Network via Fayetteville Street from Southpoint to Durham Station; Serves NC Central University
6	Durham Station	Briar Rose Lane; Danube Lane	Duke/VA - Hillandale Road - Horton Road	Serves Duke Regional Hospital and Duke/VA Hospitals
7	Durham Station	Hope Valley Shopping Center; MLK Jr. Pkwy	S. Roxboro St - Forest Hills - MLK Pkwy	
8	Durham Station	Laurel Oaks Drive; Cornwallis Road	Lawson St - NCCU - Durham Tech	Serves both NC Central University and Durham Tech
9	Durham Station	Duke Regional Hospital	Dearborn Dr - Duke Regional Hospital	
10	Durham Station	New Hope Commons	University Dr - South Square - Patterson Place	Frequent Service Network via Chapel Hill Rd from Durham Station to South Square; 10B runs weekdays from 7 am to 6 pm; Every hour, buses serve Nation Av/Bedford St
10B	Durham Station	South Square	University Dr - South Square - MLK Jr Pkwy	Frequent Service Network via Chapel Hill Rd from Durham Station to South Square; 10B runs weekdays from 7 am to 6 pm; Every hour, buses serve Nation Av/Bedford St
11	Durham Station	Hillsborough Rd; US 15-501 SB	W. Main St - Duke/VA - Hillsborough St	Frequent Service Network from Durham Station to Duke/VA Hospitals
11B	Durham Station	Constitution Dr; Neal Road	W. Main St - Duke/VA - Constitutional Dr	Frequent Service Network from Durham Station to Duke/VA Hospitals
12	Durham Station	NC-54 at NC-55	E. Main St - NCCU - Falls Pointe	Frequent Service Network via Main Street from Durham Station to Alston
13	The Village Shopping Center	Bacon St; Cooper St	The Village - Main St - Bacon St	Crosstown route serving The Village, NCCU, and Durham Tech
16	Durham Station	Southern High School	Holloway St - The Village - NC-98	Frequent Service Network via Holloway Street from Durham Station to The Village

=== Former Routes ===
Route	Terminal A	Terminus B	Streets Served	Notes & Replacements
BCC	Bull City Connector			A fare-free route connecting Downtown Durham.; Operated 15-minute service during weekday daytime hours and 20 minutes during weekends and weekday evenings; Increased resources on GoDurham's fleet and routes.; Discontinued in 2020 as part of the Short Range Transit Plan and low ridership.
1A	Croasdaile Crossing		North Pointe, Northgate, & Croasdaile Crossing	1A serves Croasdaile Crossing and North Pointe Shopping Center. 1B skips North Pointe Dr, running only on Guess Rd.; Route 1 runs all week. Croasdale Crossings is now served during limited runs.; Discontinued in 2020 as part of the Short Range Transit Plan.
1B	Horton Rd; Guess Rd		Northgate, Guess Road, & Willowdale	1A serves Croasdaile Crossing and North Pointe Shopping Center. 1B skips North Pointe Dr, running only on Guess Rd.; Route 1 runs all week. Croasdale Crossings is now served during limited runs.; Discontinued in 2020 as part of the Short Range Transit Plan.
1N	Northgate Mall & Durham Station			Small shuttle service connecting Downtown Durham and Northgate Mall.; Merged into the 1A/1B routes.; Provided 15 minute service between Northgate Mall and Durham Station; Unknown when discontinued.
2	Page Rd; Angier Av		E. Main St, Angier Ave, & Page Rd	Discontinued in 2020 as part of the Short Range Transit Plan.; 2A merged with the 2 route, which then took over the discontinued 15 route into a single route 2.
2A	Page Rd; Angier Av		Angier Ave & Page Rd	Discontinued in 2020 as part of the Short Range Transit Plan.; 2A merged with the 2 route, which then took over the discontinued 15 route into a single route 2.
2B	The Village Shopping Center		Angier Ave, Eastern Durham, & The Village	Restructured 3C route replaces section in The Village. Route 2 will provide more service.; Discontinued in 2020 as part of the Short Range Transit Plan.
3T	Holloway St, The Village, & Glenview Station			None
5	South Square		Fayetteville St, NCCU, & South Square	Now serves the Streets at Southpoint, replacing the 7 route ahead of MLK Jr. Pkwy.; South Square service was replaced by the 10B route.; Discontinued in 2013 as part of the Designing Better Service plan.
5K	MLK Jr. Pkwy; Fayetteville Rd		Fayetteville St, NCCU, & MLK Jr. Pkwy	Originally discontinued in 2020, restored in Fall 2021.; Discontinued October 2022. Frequent Service Network restored on Fayetteville St, route 5 operates 15 minute service.
6	Hillsborough Rd		Duke/VA | American Village	Discontinued in 2020 as part of the Short-Range Transit Plan; Simplified in a new 6 route, which serves Crest St, Duke/VA, and Durham Station.
6B	Constitution Dr		Duke/VA | Sparger Road	Discontinued in 2020 as part of the Short-Range Transit Plan; Simplified in a new 6 route, which serves Crest St, Duke/VA, and Durham Station.
6X	Duke/VA Hospitals		Duke/VA Express	Introduced in October 1991, ran non-stop between the Downtown Terminal and Duke/VA Hospitals.; Discontinued around January 1994, replaced by additional service to routes 6 and 11.
7	Highway 55; Sedwick Dr		Fayetteville St, S. Roxboro St, & NC-54	Serves Fayetteville St after MLK Jr Pkwy. Serves the Streets at Southpoint.; Service below MLK Jr. Pkwy is operated by a new route 5.; Service now turns to MLK Jr. Pkwy to existing 7 route.
9 (First)	Oxford Commons		Dearborn Drive, Durham Regional Hospital, & Oxford Commons	Once reaching downtown, it will run the 11 route.; Service extended to Riverview Shopping Center.; Route changed in 2013 due to the Designing Better Bus Service Plan.
9 (Second)	Riverview Shopping Center		Dearborn Dr, N. Roxboro Rd, & Horton Rd	Only ran during evenings, Sundays, and holidays.; Serves Foxfire Apartments and JFK Towers; Discontinued in 2024, due to 9A/9B service running at all times,
10	University Place or New Hope Commons or Woodcroft Pkwy		Woodcroft & New Hope Commons	Discontinued in 2013 due to the Designing Better Bus Service Plan, route 10/10A runs full service to New Hope Commons, route 10B runs to South Square.; Service for Woodcroft served by route 14, now by route 12.
10A	New Hope Commons		University Drive, South Square, & New Hope Commons	Discontinued in 2020, Route 10 took all day service.
10L	University Place	Jordan High School	Jordan High School Link	Originally designated as the 10T in the final plan.; Operated during school hours early only; Discontinued in August 2013. Service replaced by route 20; Currently no active service replacement.
12B	Lowe's Grove Middle School			Not directly, however routes 12/12B and GoTriangle's 805 stops near it.
13	The Village Shopping Center	Birchwood; Lynn Road	Durham Technical Community College & The Village	
14 (First)	Horton Rd; Guess Rd	Duke/VA Hospitals	Willowdale - Duke/VA	Introduced in January 1995, under delays.; Possibly discontinued around 1996.
14 (Second)	NCCU Campus Shuttle			Fare-Free Shuttle running every 20 minutes from 7:30 am to 11 pm.; Discontinued somewhere around 2009; NCCU is still offered by the 5, 8 and 12/12B routes.
14 (Third)	The Streets at Southpoint	NC-54; Alston Av	NC-54, The Streets at Southpoint, Woodcroft Pkwy	Interlined with the 12 route. During weekends and weekday evenings, its interlined with the 5 route.; Discontinued in 2020 as part of the Short Range Transit Plan.; Route 14 trips now incorporated into the 12 route. Woodcroft is provided by on-demand service.
15	Brier Creek			"Express" route via Durham Freeway; Collaboration with DATA and CAT (Now GoRaleigh), introduced in November 2005.; Discontinued in 2020. Now served by an extended 2 route from Angier Avenue.
16	Southern High School; Freeman Rd	The Village Shopping Center	Southern High School & The Village	Routes 16 and 16A merged into one route, which was renamed the 3B route.; The portion after Lynn Road extended into a new route, named the 3C route.
16A	Southern High School		The Village, NC-98, & Southern High School	Routes 16 and 16A merged into one route, which was renamed the 3B route.; The portion after Lynn Road extended into a new route, named the 3C route.
16B (Second)	Rummel St; Highway 98		The Village, Birchwood, & Ross Road	Section replaced by the new 3B and then 3C routes.
16B (First)	Neal Middle School		Neal Middle School & Southern High School	None
17 (First)	South Square; Loop	Duke Medical Center	Westgate Dr, Garrett Rd, & Chapel Hill Rd	17 is a loop route. Serves South Square Mall, Woodcroft Shopping Center, New Hope Commons, and Duke Medical Center.; 17A is a short variant of the route, only running during evenings. Serving NCCU, South Square Mall, and New Hope Commons.; Discontinued in Q2 2003. Restored by Q3 2003 as a brand new route
17A	Lakewood; Roxboro St	New Hope Commons	Fayetteville St, Cornwallis Rd, & University Dr	17 is a loop route. Serves South Square Mall, Woodcroft Shopping Center, New Hope Commons, and Duke Medical Center.; 17A is a short variant of the route, only running during evenings. Serving NCCU, South Square Mall, and New Hope Commons.; Discontinued in Q2 2003. Restored by Q3 2003 as a brand new route
17 (Second)	Foxfire Apartments; Horton Rd	Durham Tech - North Campus; Torrege Rd	Snow Hill Road & Horton Road	Added on Q3 2003. Completely new route. Discontinued January 2013, as part of the Designing Better Bus Service project.; Replaced by the 9A/9B routes. 9A serves Horton Rd portion and route 9B runs the 17 until Northern High School.
20	Woodcroft Shopping Center	Duke University; VA Hospitals	Woodcroft, South Square, & Duke & VA Limited	Added in 2018, to connect Southern Durham with Duke University. Operating only during Duke class hours.; Stopped running in July 2021, confirmed to be eliminated in 2023.
23	Angier Av; Guthrie Av	The Village Shopping Center	The Village & NC-98 Loop & East Durham	Replaced with restructured 3B route that now runs everyday.; Discontinued in 2020 as part of the Short Range Transit Plan.
NHS	Northern High School Tom Wilkinson Road			

== Future ==
=== GoDurham Better Bus Project ===
The GoDurham Better Bus Project is a program created in 2019 by the City of Durham to plan and improve current bus stops, crosswalks, and roads to both make bus stops more comfortable for riders and to speed up GoDurham service. The 18-month plan, which has six projects plans to improve major corridor routes, more attention on both Holloway Street and Fayetteville Street bus lines.

Currently, GoDurham's planned projects are shown here, expected to be planned and finished by 2026-2027:

- Bus Access Project - Will allow easier access to bus stops by adding sidewalks 1/4th mile from a GoDurham bus stop.
- Bus Speed and Reliability Project - Allows for the improvement of bus service by prioritizing buses in traffic, pavement markings, and better signage.
- Durham Station Transit Area - This project will evaluate current streets in Downtown Durham taken by GoDurham buses and improving those streets to speed up service to/from Durham Station
- Fayetteville Street Corridor - This project would allow major improvements around Fayetteville Street like enhanced bus stops, better traffic, and safer access which will increase reliability, safety, and will speed up the route. This is currently in the design phase.
- Holloway Street Corridor and Village Transit Center - This project will follow the Fayetteville St Corridor goals with an additional transit center for The Village. This is currently in the design phase.
- Bus Stop Balancing Study - Removes low ridership stops and modify existing stops to increase service reliability.

=== Durham Transit Plan ===
The Durham Transit Plan is the plan for GoDurham's long-term future bus improvements for the city by 2040. In April 2011, Durham County added a sales tax for public transit to allow this plan to happen. This plans allows for the improvement of bus stops, acquire electric vehicles, and increased service. Durham was recently awarded $10.8 million in funding, which will allow GoDurham to advance with this plan.

==== Current Progress ====
The program is currently in its expansion phase, which has started to affect the GoDurham Network. Current changes since August 2025 are:

- Creating brand new bus terminals in The Streets at Southpoint and Glenview Station as part of their Bus Stop Improvement program.
  - Improving 90 bus stops with benches and/or adding shelters.
- Received 8 new electric buses with another 18 expected to arrive within two years.
- Providing 30 minute service across the majority of the GoDurham network.
- Adding all or some 15-minute service/Frequent Service Network on routes 5, 3/3B/3C, 2/12/12B, 10/10B, & 11/11B.
- Micro transit on the East and North Durham Zones, now named Durham Connect
- Service Improvements on North Durham on routes 1, 4, 6, and 9.
- Increased all service to run every 30 minutes during weekdays, evening, and weekends.

==== 2024-2028 Short Range Transit Plan ====
In the summer of 2023, GoDurham and GoTriangle provided the draft for the new Short-Range Transit Plan., which is planned to improve the bus network in Durham from 2024 to 2028. Funding has been approved for these services, which the changes would happen between 2024 and 2028. These changes include:

- Add a crosstown route connecting NCCU, Durham Tech, and The Village Shopping Center
- Improve 75 bus stops are scheduled to be improved, with 114 more being planned.
- Increase frequency on route 3, 4, 9, and 10 routes to run 15-minute service weekdays and Saturdays.
- Create a transportation center in The Village Shopping Center
- Increased service on GoTriangle routes in Durham.

==== Future Transit Plans ====
These other ideas are being considered to be added in the far future. These include:

- Create a transit center in North Duke Crossing [4/6]
- Acquire more buses for increased service.
- Extend Chapel Hill Transit's D route to Patterson Place.
- Provide ideas for North Durham [4/6] and Chapel Hill Road [10/10B] Transit Corridors.
