= GoCary =

Public transportation provider in Cary, North Carolina

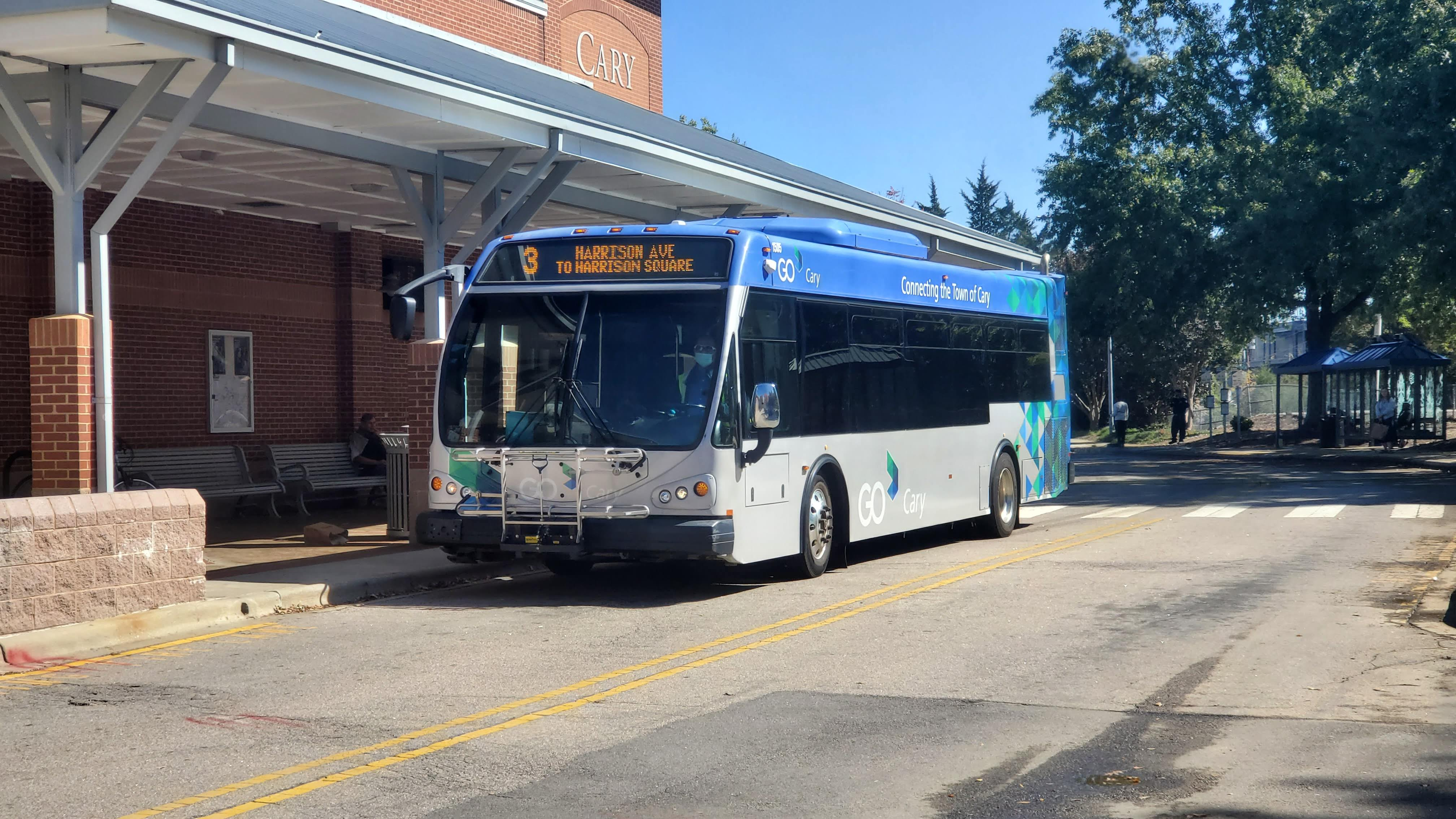
- Founded: 2001
- Headquarters: Town of Cary, 316 N. Academy St., NC 27513
- Locale: Cary, North Carolina
- Service area: Cary and portion of Raleigh
- Service type: Transit bus
- Routes: 9
- Stops: 200+
- Hubs: 2
- Stations: 1 - Cary Depot
- Fleet: 38 vehicles
- Annual ridership: 320,000 fixed routes and paratransit FY13
- Fuel type: Diesel
- Operator: MV Transportation, Inc.
- Chief executive: Kelly Blazey, Transit Administrator
- Website: GoCary

GoCary is the public transportation provider in Cary, a community in the Research Triangle urbanized area in North Carolina. While the city of Raleigh provides service to most of the county via GoRaleigh, Cary opted to retain its own town-owned system. Raleigh, Durham, Chapel Hill, Cary, and Wake Forest, the five cities that constitute the region, are connected by GoTriangle. Fixed-route service operates Monday through Saturday from 6 a.m. to 10 p.m. and Sundays from 7 a.m. to 9 p.m. As part of the GoTransit branding initiative for the Triangle, GoCary changed its name from Cary Transit or C-Tran on October 1, 2016.

== Services ==
=== GoCary ===
GoCary's fixed-route bus service consists of nine routes: Most routes terminate downtown on Hillsboro Street beside the train station where connections can also be made with GoTriangle's 300, 301, and 310 routes. They also run an express route connecting Apex and Cary.

All fixed route buses are equipped with wheelchair lifts, bike racks, GPS, automated bus stop annunciation system, and electronic fareboxes. Passengers can access real-time bus information system for all system routes by downloading the free Transloc app on their smartphones.

The town began offering general public fixed-route service in December 2005. The town utilizes the services of a regional call center to handle all inquiries about fixed-route services.

In fiscal year 2014, GoCary provided 301,860 one-way passenger trips on their general public fixed-route system. Extended hours from 8 p.m. to 10 p.m. were initiated in July 2014.

GoCary also provides door-to-door transit services for citizens 60+ years old and those with disabilities. Service is provided Monday through Saturday from 6:00 a.m. to 10:00 p.m. Approximately 45,000 one-way passenger trips are provided annually on the door-to-door services.

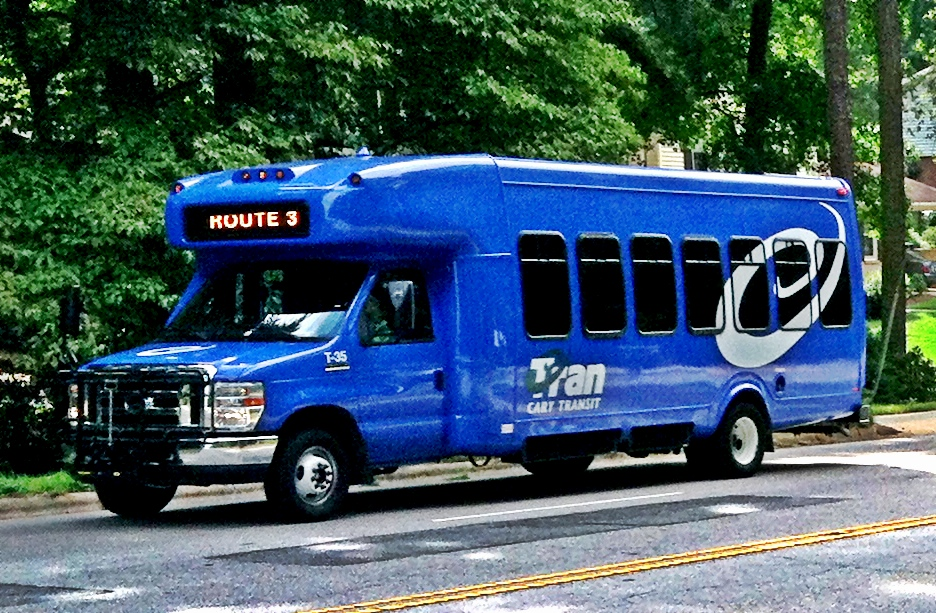
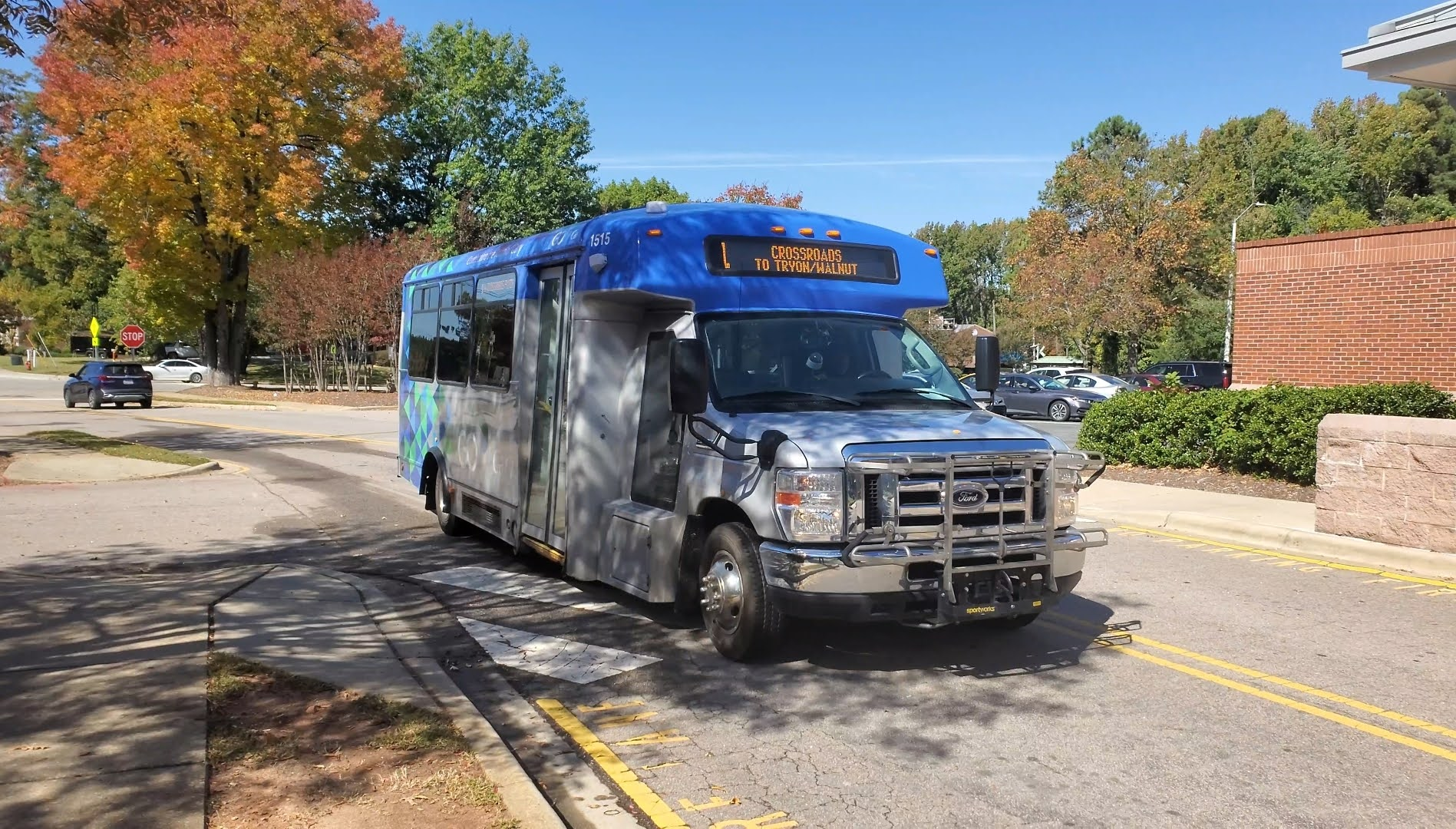
C-Train utilized a dark blue body with one white spiral, depicting the logo. GoCary uses cyan, light blue, and blue-green triangles on a gray body.

=== GoApex ===
GoApex is the transit system serving the Town of Apex. The town collaborated with GoCary to provide service to the GA1 route, which began in August 2022. GoApex also collaborated with GoWake ACCESS to provide their own paratransit services, called GoApex Door-to-Door. They currently operate the GA1 route every hour from 6 am to 10 pm, Mondays to Saturdays. It's also fare-free.

== Current Service ==
=== Route List ===
Route	Name	Destinations		
1	Crossroads	Crossroads Plaza; Crossroads Blvd at Marshalls	↔	Downtown Cary; Cary Station
3	Harrison	SAS Institute - Harrison Oaks; Harrison Oaks Blvd at N Harrison Ave	↔	Downtown Cary; Cary Station
4	High House	High House Crossing; NC 55 at Green Level West Rd	↔	Downtown Cary; Cary Station
5	Kildaire Farm	Crescent Commons; Crescent Commons Dr at Crescent Green	↔	Downtown Cary; Cary Station
6	Buck Jones	Plaza West Shopping Center	↔	Downtown Cary; Cary Station
7	Weston	Lake Crabtree; Harrison Oaks Blvd at N Harrison Ave	↔	Downtown Cary; Cary Station
ACX	Apex-Cary Express	Downtown Apex; Apex Park and Ride	↔	Downtown Cary; Cary Station
DL	Downtown Loop	Downtown Cary		
GA1	GoApex Route 1	Downtown Apex; Hunter St at Town Hall Campus	↔	Western Apex; Olive Chapel Professional Park

== Future ==
=== Wake Transit Plan ===
While intended for GoRaleigh, the plan is also providing beneficial changes to GoCary/GoApex and GoTriangle services. As of now, the plan has already changed services in Cary. These benefits are:

- Added 30-minute frequencies from 9 am to 3 pm on routes 3, 4, 5, and 6 during Mondays-Saturdays.
- Introduced GoTriangle's 310 route, connecting Regional Transit Center in Durham and Cary Station during weekdays.
- Added bus route to Weston Parkway (route 7) and Park West Shopping Center. In FY2021, service was increased to 30-minute service.
- Introduce an Apex-Cary Express route (ACX), which will both support GoTriangle's existing 305 route.
- Add service during holidays and Sundays.

Major plans are planned for Cary for the upcoming decade. These are the planned changes for the future:

- Change GoCary's 6 route, which connects Cary Towne Center and Cary Station, extend to a new route, named the 9B | Buck Jones, which will extend to NC State Fairgrounds to connect with GoRaleigh's new 9 route and provide transfers to GoTriangle's 300 and 305 routes.
  - Add another route connecting Downtown Cary and NC State Fairgrounds via Chapel Hill Road & Trinity Road, named the 9A | Hillsborough - Trinity. This will also provide connections to GoRaleigh's new 9 route.
- Add a BRT service connecting Downtown Raleigh and Cary Station, which will serve major destinations. Service provided would be 10–15 minutes during peak hours and 20 minutes during weekends.

=== Advance Apex Plan ===
For GoApex, the town of Apex has their own plan to expand service before 2045. Funding has been given since 2019 by the town of Apex, GoCary/Town of Cary, and GoWake ACCESS. The plan has already started, providing Apex's first fixed-route service and paratransit services.

However, plans are for this town to expand bus service further. These are the possible proposals that the plan offers:

- Add additional local routes, serving different communities.
- Create a Durham-Apex Express connector route, most likely operated by GoTriangle.
- Enhance regional connections to Apex. (GoTriangle's 305 and 311 routes.)
