= GoTriangle =

Public transit service in North Carolina, USA

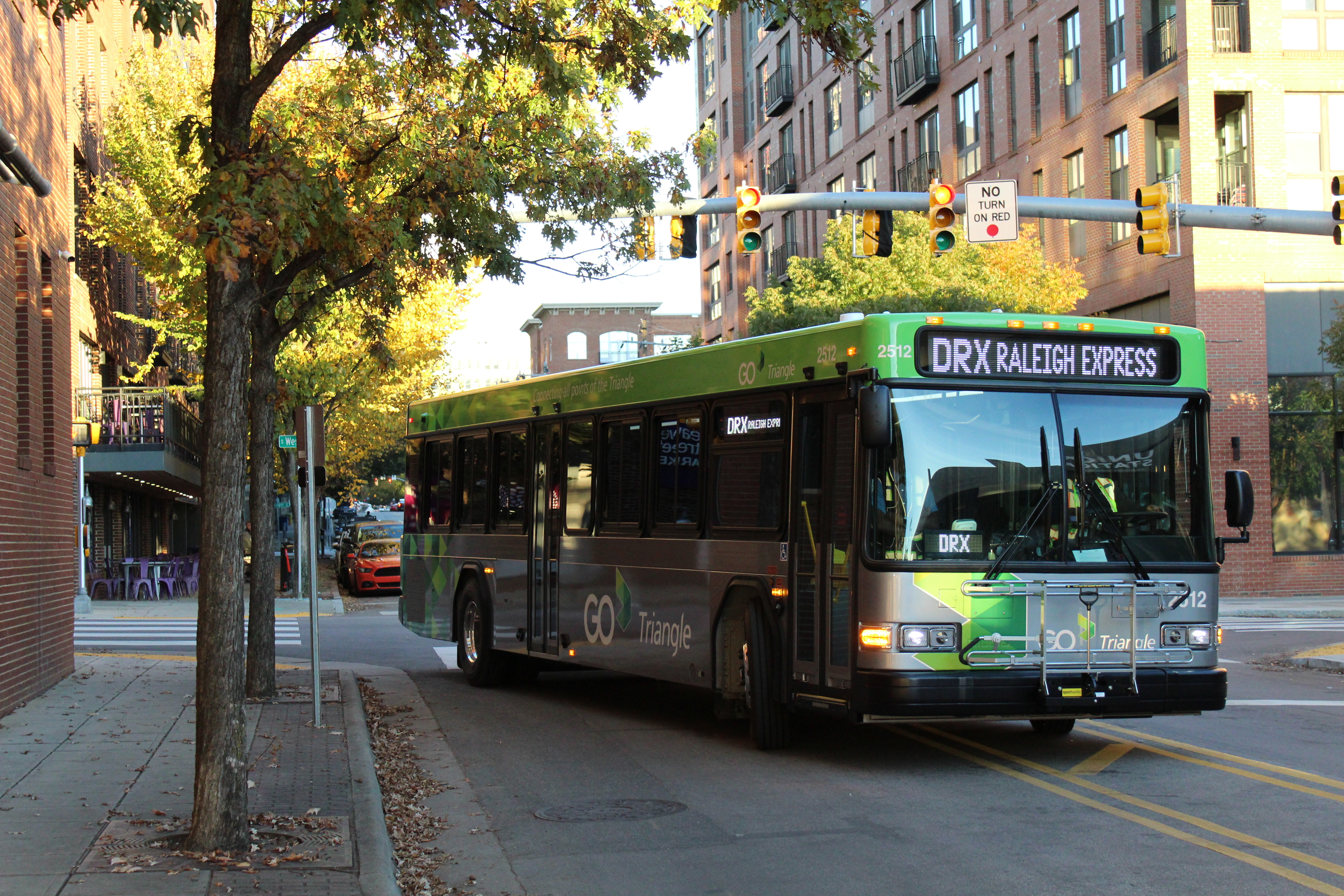
- GoTriangle bus in Raleigh
- Founded: 1989
- Headquarters: 4600 Emperor Blvd; Durham, North Carolina
- Service area: Research Triangle
- Service type: Bus service; Express bus service; Park and ride; Paratransit
- Alliance: GoTransit
- Routes: 21
- Fleet: 65
- Daily ridership: 6,400 (weekdays, Q2 2026)
- Annual ridership: 1,518,300 (2025)
- Chief executive: Dr. Brian Smith
- Website: gotriangle.org

GoTriangle is the operator of regional public transit bus services in the Research Triangle region of North Carolina. GoTriangle is a member of the region-wide GoTransit system, operating limited-stop and express bus services in Wake, Durham, and Orange counties.

The agency was founded in 1989, and is officially known as the Research Triangle Regional Public Transportation Authority. Before the adoption of the current GoTriangle name in 2015, the agency was known as the Triangle Transit Authority and Triangle Transit. In 2025, GoTriangle had a ridership of 1,518,300, or about 6,400 per weekday as of the second quarter of 2026.

== History ==
GoTriangle, Average Daily Ridership, All Modes, 2003–2016

=== 1989 to 2000 ===
==== Founding as TTA ====
The 1989 session of the North Carolina General Assembly enabled the creation of the Triangle Transit Authority as a regional public transportation authority serving Durham, Orange, and Wake counties. The new unit of local government was chartered by the NC Secretary of State on December 1, 1989.

- 1991 – the NC General Assembly, subject to County approvals, authorized Triangle Transit to levy a vehicle registration tax of up to $5 per registration. This tag tax finances the regional bus operations, vanpooling program, and planning program.
- 1992 – the Triangle Transit Authority (TTA) completed the Triangle Fixed Guideway Study, after securing a grant from the Federal Transit Administration (FTA) to study long-range regional public transportation for the three-county Triangle region (Durham, Orange, and Wake).
- Feb 1995 – TTA Board of Trustees adopted the Preliminary Recommendations for a Regional Transit Plan, after evaluating several alternatives and received feedback from land use and transportation professionals, elected officials and the public.
- Oct 1995 – TTA Board of Trustees adopted the recommendations for a Regional Transit Plan and subsequently incorporated into the region's two long-range transportation plans. This document guides regional transit planning efforts today.
- 1997 – the NC General Assembly, subject to County approvals, authorized Triangle Transit to levy a rental vehicle tax of up to 5% of gross receipts. This tax, effective January 1, 1998, will finance future capital projects.
- Jan 1998 – TTA, in cooperation with the FTA, initiated the Preliminary Engineering (PE) phase of project development and started preparing a Draft Environmental Impact Statement (DEIS) for the proposed Regional Rail Transit System.

=== 2000s to 2010s ===
==== Planning and developments ====
In May 2001, the Draft Environmental Impact Statement (DEIS) was prepared in accordance with the National Environmental Policy Act (NEPA) and all applicable federal rules and regulations, which emphasized the project's environmental impacts, mitigation measures, and community involvement. In January 2003, the Federal Transit Administration (FTA) issued a Record of Decision (ROD), confirming that all required analyses, mitigation, and public involvement objectives had been met. Subsequently, in February 2003, the FTA approved TTA's request to progress to the Final Design phase, allowing for further refinement of project details.

By August 2005, TTA had completed the 100% level of design, finalizing plans for station locations and track alignments, and continued progressing toward the receipt of federal funds. However, in late 2007, facing increasing project costs and changes in federal New Starts cost-benefits formulas, Triangle Transit opted not to submit a New Starts application for FTA funding. This decision led to the suspension of the project as costs and future funding options were reexamined.

Triangle Transit was established to plan, finance, organize, and operate a public transportation system for the Research Triangle area, focusing on three main program areas:

1. Regional bus service
2. Vanpool service
3. Regional transit planning

Since 1995, the cornerstone of Triangle Transit's long-term strategy involved a 28-mile rail corridor stretching from northeast Raleigh, through downtown Raleigh, Cary, and Research Triangle Park, to Durham using Diesel Multiple Unit (DMU) technology. Proposals to extend this corridor by an additional 7 miles to Chapel Hill using light rail technology were indefinitely deferred in 2006 after the Federal Transit Administration declined funding for the project due to financial constraints and shifting federal priorities.

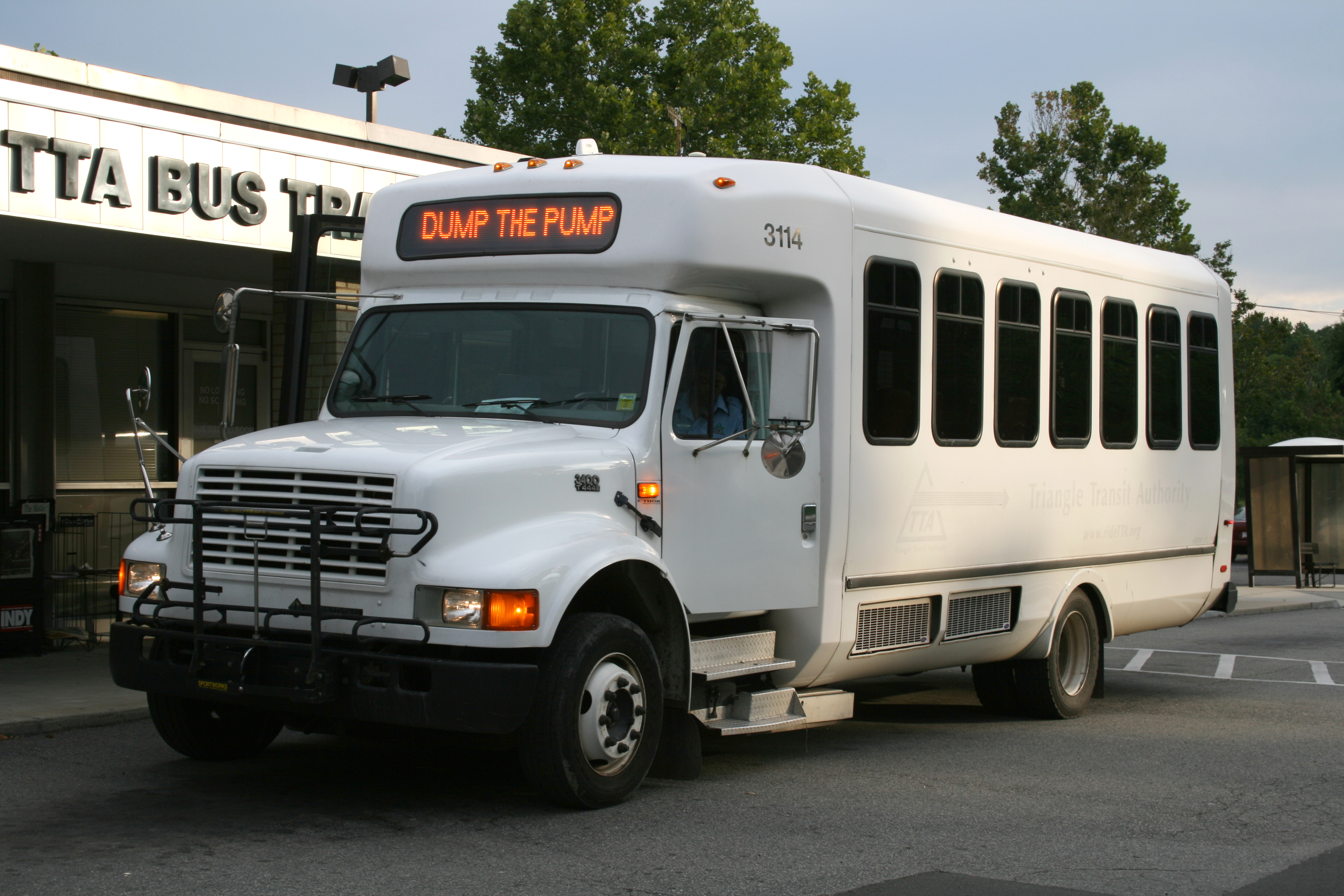
TTA bus advertising as gas prices soar in July, 2008.

On March 17, 2008, after 15 years as Triangle Transit Authority, the Board of Trustees changed the agency's name and logo to Triangle Transit. Triangle Transit Board Chair Sig Hutchinson announced its new promise to the Triangle:

Triangle Transit improves our region’s quality of life by connecting people and places with reliable, safe, and easy-to-use travel choices that reduce congestion and energy use, save money, and promote sustainability, healthier lifestyles, and a more environmentally responsible community.

GoTriangle is governed by a thirteen-member Board of Trustees. Ten members are appointed by the region's principal municipalities and counties and three members are appointed by the North Carolina Secretary of Transportation.

Planning for a regional transit system began in the early 1990s under the guidance of the Triangle Transit Authority. In 1992, the Triangle Fixed Guideway Study was completed after securing a grant from the Federal Transit Administration (FTA) to study long-range regional public transportation for the three-county Triangle region (Durham, Orange, and Wake). The study examined regional economic growth opportunities and identified potential locations for growth, corridors that could connect these growth areas, and changes in land use that would need to take place to support transit. Recommendations from the plan were adopted by the TTA Board of Trustees in 1995, and were incorporated into the region's long-range transportation plans. By 1998, preliminary engineering and environmental planning of the project was underway. In 2003, the FTA issued a record of decision and allowed the project to move into final design.

TTA completed the 100% level of design and continued progressing toward the receipt of federal funds in 2005. In late 2007, due to rising project costs and a change in federal New Starts cost-benefits formulas, Triangle Transit elected not to submit a New Starts application for FTA funding. As a result, work on the regional rail system was suspended in order to reexamine costs and future funding options.

To analyze the future of regional rail in the Triangle, a partnership between TTA, Capital Area Metropolitan Planning Organization (CAMPO), Durham-Chapel Hill-Carrboro Metropolitan Planning Organization (DCHC), NC Department of Transportation's Public Transportation Division (NCDOT), and Triangle J Council of Governments (TJCOG) jointly conducted The Transit Blueprint Technical Analysis Project. This 2007 effort was a collaboration between agencies to provide the technical basis for analyzing both future transit corridors and the planned or potential transit infrastructure investment within those corridors. The results of the Blueprint have been used to set priorities for major transit investments based on land use, travel market, and cost characteristics.

The Special Transit Advisory Commission (STAC), which met between May 2007 and April 2008, was a broad-based citizen group with 38 members from across the Research Triangle Region. The STAC was appointed by CAMPO and DCHC to assist in the joint development of a plan for a regional transit system and to craft recommendations for the transit component of their respective Long Range Transportation Plans (LRTPs), with a focus on major transit investments. The Commission presented their final report to the metropolitan planning organizations (MPOs) at a joint meeting on May 21, 2008.

In 2009 the region's two planning organizations, CAMPO and DCHC, completed work on 2035 Long Range Transportation Plans. The plans include increased bus service and the addition of rail service. A coalition of transit, transportation, and environmental groups joined to support State House Bill 148, providing for future referendums for funding transit projects using voter-approved sales taxes. Triangle and Triad counties can hold referendums on a one-half cent sales tax for transit. Other counties are permitted to go to the voters for a one-quarter cent sales tax. With passage in the NC General Assembly in summer 2009, Governor Bev Perdue signed the bill into law in August 2009.

Currently, counties in the region are working with Triangle Transit, CAMPO and DCHC to finalize individual county plans, which will include enhanced transit options. County Commissions have the authority to call for a referendum when they are satisfied with the transit plans they have decided upon and are ready to go to the voters for funding. Durham County passed a one-half cent sales tax for transit in November 2011. The adopted bill also ties state funding into future projects.

In April 2012, a Notice of Intent (NOI) was published in the Federal Register indicating that the Federal Transit Administration and Triangle Transit intend to prepare an Environmental Impact Statement (EIS) for the Durham-Orange LRT project only. Scoping meetings for the D-O LRT project took place in May 2012 in order to bring together elected officials and regulatory agencies (the US Department of Transportation, US Environmental Protection Agency, US Army Corps of Engineers, and others). From their discussions, a Scoping Report was published and identified all human and natural environment aspects of the project that required additional analysis and consideration during the EIS phase.

Evaluation of the Wake Corridor and the Durham-Wake Corridor options continues in the background.

Three public meetings in November 2013 will show the alternatives carried forward for further study in the Environmental Impact Statement phase.

==== Proposed light rail ====
Planning began on a new light rail project between Durham and Chapel Hill in 2013 as part of Durham and Orange County Transit Plans. The 17.7-mile light rail service connects the UNC Hospitals in Chapel Hill to NCCU in Durham, serving major locations in the two regions.

The Environmental Impact Analysis for the Durham-Orange LRT project, from 2012 to 2016 with environmental monitoring, delineation of the potential project boundaries and alignment, and agency communication and coordination.

In July 2017, GoTriangle received approval from the Federal Transit Administration to proceed from initial “Project Development” to “New Starts Engineering,” which means GoTriangle will work closely with FTA over the next few years to finalize the project design. Entry into the engineering phase means our region will be on track to receive over $1 billion in federal investment, which accounts for 50 percent of the total project funding, which is funded by state funding and sale taxes.

== Routes and major destinations ==
GoTriangle is a regional bus service, offering a wide variety of transit and vanpool services around the Research Triangle. Operating service around the major cities of Durham, Raleigh, Chapel Hill, Cary, and Apex. GoTriangle is a supporting agency of the Special Transit Advisory Commission's work to plan for the region's transit future. The STAC completed its work in May 2008 and has provided its recommendations to the area's two planning organizations: Capital Area Metropolitan Planning Organization (CAMPO) and Durham-Chapel Hill-Carrboro Metropolitan Planning Organization (DCHC MPO).

=== Route List ===
Route	Terminals			Notes
100	GoRaleigh Station	↔	Regional Transit Center	Route 100 serves RDU Airport at nights; Serves Raleigh Union Station
300	Cary Station	↔	Raleigh Union Station
305	Downtown Apex	↔	Raleigh Union Station	Rush-hour service runs to Apex & Holly Springs
310	Cary Station	↔	Regional Transit Center	Runs weekdays only
400	Chapel Hill	↔	Durham Station	400/405 runs 15-minute service between Durham and Chapel Hill during peak hours; 400 runs 15-minute service during middays
405	Jones Ferry Park & Ride; Serves Chapel Hill	↔	Durham Station	400/405 runs 15-minute service between Durham and Chapel Hill during peak hours; 400 runs 15-minute service during middays
420	Chapel Hill	↔	Hillsborough	Operated by Chapel Hill Transit until August 3, 2026
700	Durham Station	↔	Regional Transit Center	Serves Durham Tech and NC Central University
705	Durham Station	↔	Regional Transit Center	Serves Research Triangle Park on weekdays
800	Chapel Hill Manning Drive	↔	Regional Transit Center
805	Chapel Hill Manning Drive	↔	The Streets at Southpoint	Runs via Woodcroft Parkway
RDU	Raleigh-Durham Int. Airport	↔	Regional Transit Center	Runs until nights, service replaced by Route 100
CRX	Chapel Hill	↔	Raleigh Union Station	DRX & CRX serves District Park & Ride during peak hours; DRX runs on weekday daytime hours; CRX runs weekday rush-hours only
DRX	Durham Station	↔	Raleigh Union Station	DRX & CRX serves District Park & Ride during peak hours; DRX runs on weekday daytime hours; CRX runs weekday rush-hours only
ODX	Mebane; Serves Hillsborough	↔	Durham Station	Serves Durham Tech Orange Campus
WRX	Wake Forest	↔	Triangle Town Center	Hourly mid-day service began November 9, 2025; Serves Raleigh Union Station in peak direction during peak hours only
ZWX	Zebulon Serves Wendell	↔	Raleigh Union Station	Hourly mid-day service began November 9, 2025

== Fleet ==
GoTriangle's operates a fleet of Gillig Low Floor buses for its fixed-route service. They also operate paratransit buses for their ACCESS program. All buses have bike racks on, which can support up to two bikes, are Wi-Fi enabled, either built-in or retrofitted for any model before 2017, and equipped with automated announcements.

=== Current roster ===
Here is the current bus roster as of November 2025

Image	Bus & Year		Fleet numbers
	2008	Gillig; Low Floor 40' Diesel	2823, 2825–2843
	2009	Gillig; Low Floor 40' Diesel	2901–2912
	2010	Gillig; Low Floor 40' Diesel	2016–2023
	2011	Gillig; Low Floor 40' Diesel	2114–2123, 2124–2129
	2017	Gillig; Low Floor 40' Diesel	2701-2710
	2019	Gillig; Low Floor 40' Diesel	1901–1905
	2020	Gillig; Low Floor 40' Diesel	2001–2006
	2022	Gillig; Low Floor 40' Diesel	2201-2206
	2025	Gillig; Low Floor Plus 40' EV	2501-2505
	2025	Gillig; Low Floor 40' Diesel	2506-2515

=== Fleet Livery ===
During the three phases of the company, they went through three livery changes. The first one, used by TTA until 2007, utilized a white, dark green, and black body with a single stripe in the white body. The second one, used when it was rebranded to Triangle Transit, used a more vibrant livery. It uses a yellow-green body with orange, white, and blue waves on the body. When the company revamped itself to GoTriangle, it used the same livery as the other GoTransit operators around them. They used a gray base, with hues of green triangles around the back. Despite the switchover to GoTriangle, some buses operating that were made before 2012 retains the old Triangle Transit livery. The top stripe displays their new motto, Connecting all points of the Triangle.

This displays all the liveries used by TTA, Triangle Transit, and GoTriangle. Left shows the dark green stripes on a white and black livery. Middle shows Triangle Transit's vibrant livery, with a green body and orange, white, and blue stripes around it. Right shows the current GoTriangle livery used since 2015.
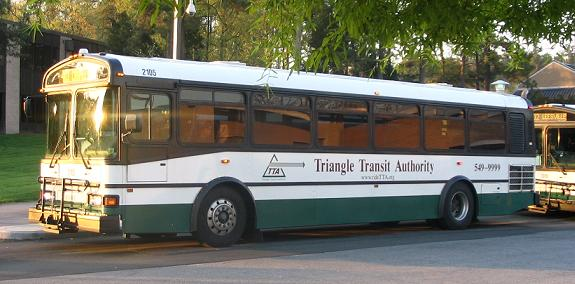
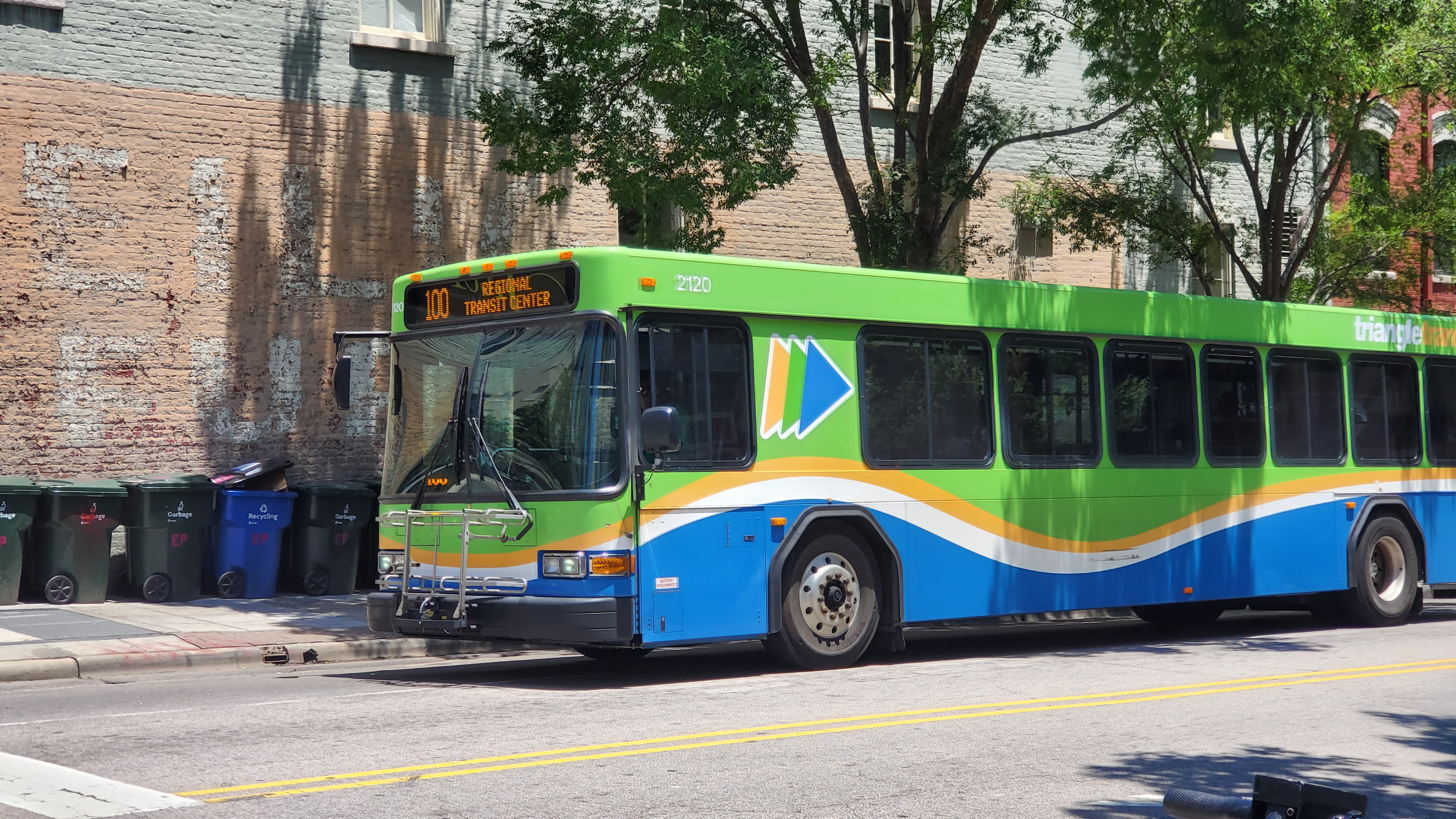
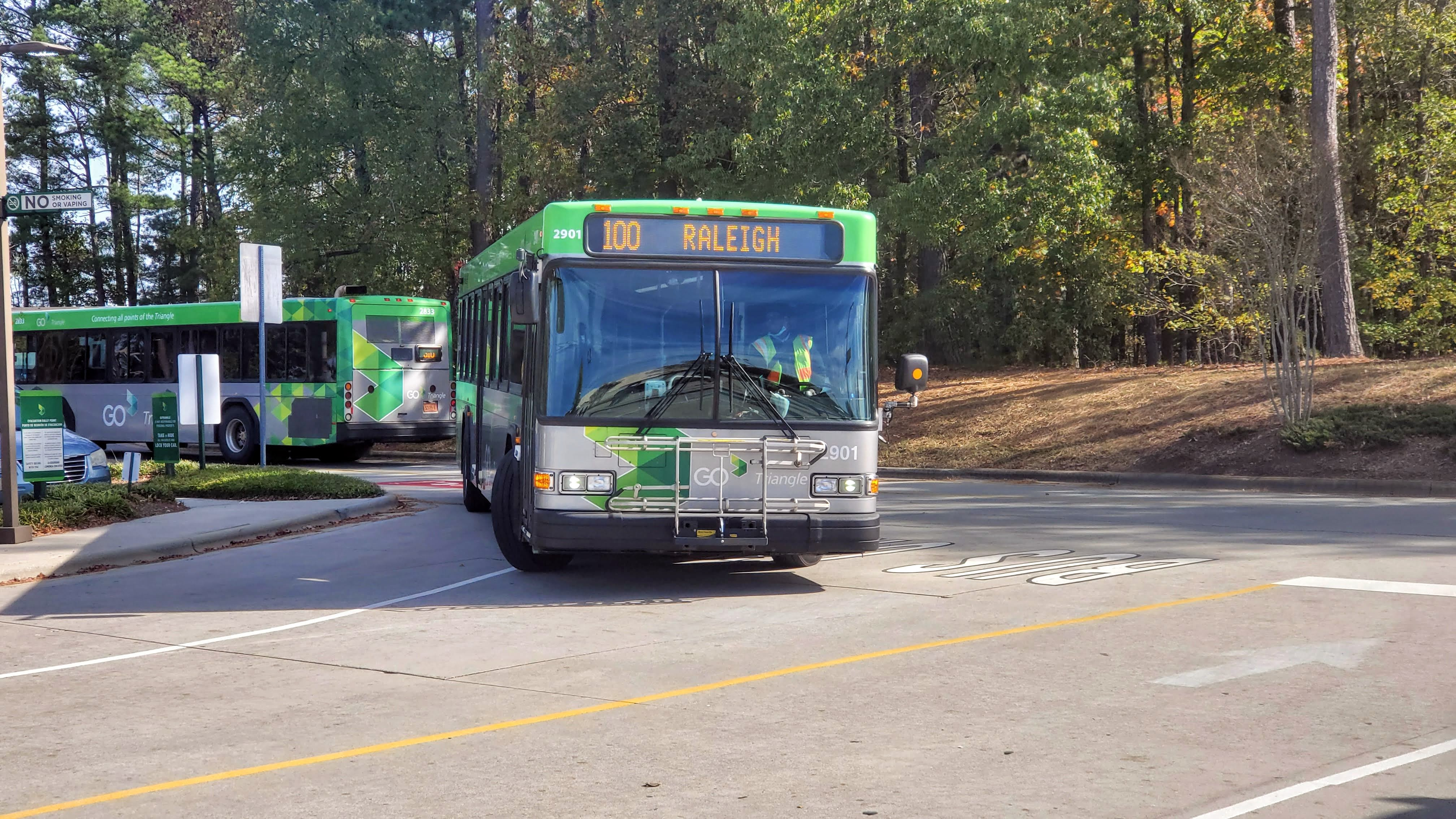

== Major transit systems and centers ==
=== Regional Transit Center ===
Since 2008, GoTriangle has a transit center located near Slater Road in Durham. Originally located in RTP. The center has a park and ride lot. The GoTriangle headquarters is also located adjescent to the terminal. In 2024, the agency received federal RAISE grant to build a new transit center near NC 54, Wilkinson Farm Road, and rail tracks owned by the North Carolina Railroad. The new development will focus on improved safety of patrons, connectivity to varied modes of transit, speed to reach destinations, and includes building multimodal facilities that support transit-oriented development.

This center is currently served by GoTriangle's 100, 700, and 800 routes at all times, GoTriangle's 310 and 705 routes during weekdays, and GoTriangle's RDU route during the day. Discounted Lyft passes to the RTC were made available in 2019.

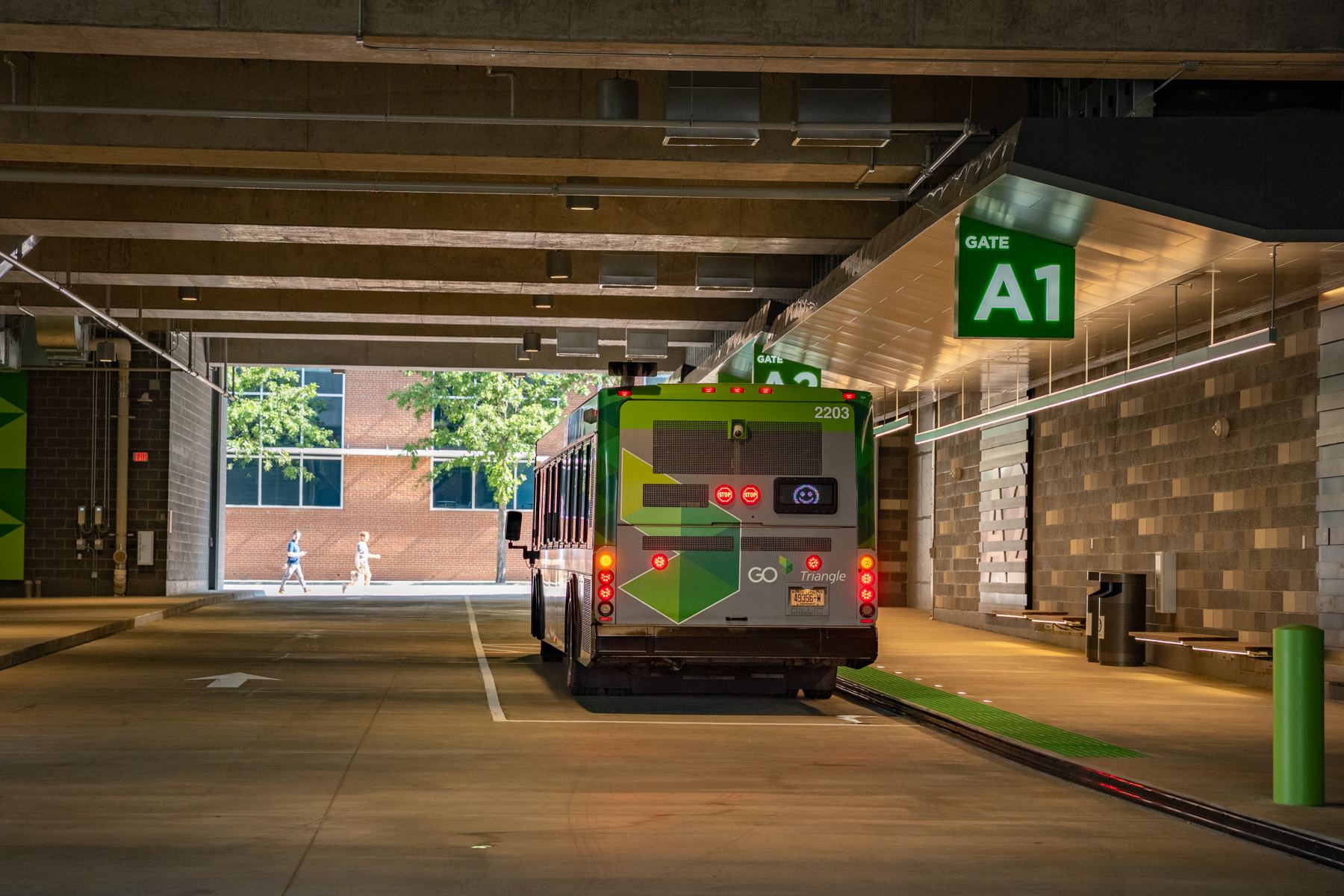
The Raleigh Union Station bus terminal in 2025

=== Raleigh Union Station Bus Facility ===
GoTriangle opened the Raleigh Union Bus Facility (or "RUS Bus") on August 3, 2025, after beginning construction in 2022.

The station is currently served by routes 300, 305, CRX, DRX, and ZWX and is served by route 100 from West Street. GoRaleigh's R-Line and route 9 also serve the station from West Street.

=== GoRaleigh ===
GoRaleigh is the transit agency serving Raleigh. Service operates from 4:30am–12:00am Monday-Saturdays, and roughly 5:00am–11:00pm during Sundays. They currently run 35 routes, separated into local routes, 'L' Circulator routes, and 'X' Express routes.

Most routes serve GoRaleigh Station, which is located near Moore Square. The terminal also serves GoTriangle's 100 route.

=== GoDurham ===
GoDurham is the transit system serving Durham. Service runs from 5:30 am–12:30 am during Mondays-Saturdays, and from 6:30 am–9:30 pm during Sundays. They operate 21 bus routes.

Almost all routes serve Durham Station, located near the Amtrak station. The terminal serves GoTriangle's 400 and 700 routes at all times and GoTriangle's 405, 705, DRX, and ODX routes during peak hours only. (Note: GoTriangle's 400, 405, 700, and Raleigh-bound DRX trips serve in Durham Station. ODX buses stop adjacent to Durham Station (Gate O))

=== Chapel Hill Transit ===
Chapel Hill Transit is the transit system serving Chapel Hill and Carrboro. Service operates from 5 am to 1:15 am during weekdays, 8 am to 6:30 pm during Saturdays, and from 10:30 am to 11:30 pm during Sundays. They currently operate 20 routes, including express routes.

They serve the University of North Carolina at Chapel Hill, serving as a major transfer hub for all routes. The terminal serves GoTriangle's 400 and 800 routes at all times, GoTriangle's 805 route on weekdays, and GoTriangle's 405, 420, and CRX routes during peak hours only.

Chapel Hill is building an 8.2 mile Bus Rapid Transit (BRT) with a projected cost of $125 million to commence passenger service in 2020 with annual operating cost of $3.4 million.

=== GoCary/GoApex ===
GoCary is the transit system serving Cary and operates GoApex, which serves Apex. Service runs between 6 am to 10 pm between Mondays-Saturdays and 7 am to 9 pm. They operate 8 routes. They also service GoApex, which only runs one route. They also offer paratransit services.

All GoCary routes serve Cary Station, while GoApex Route 1 serves Downtown Apex. GoTriangle's 300 route serves Cary Station at all times and GoTriangle's 310 route during weekdays. Downtown Apex is served by GoTriangle's 305 route at all times

=== Orange Public Transportation ===
Orange Public Transportation is a transit program serving Hillsborough, Outer Chapel Hill, and Carrboro. They offer fixed-route bus service and paratransit services, as well as a Mobility On-Demand ridesharing service within Orange County and surrounding areas. They currently run three fixed-route circulator routes.

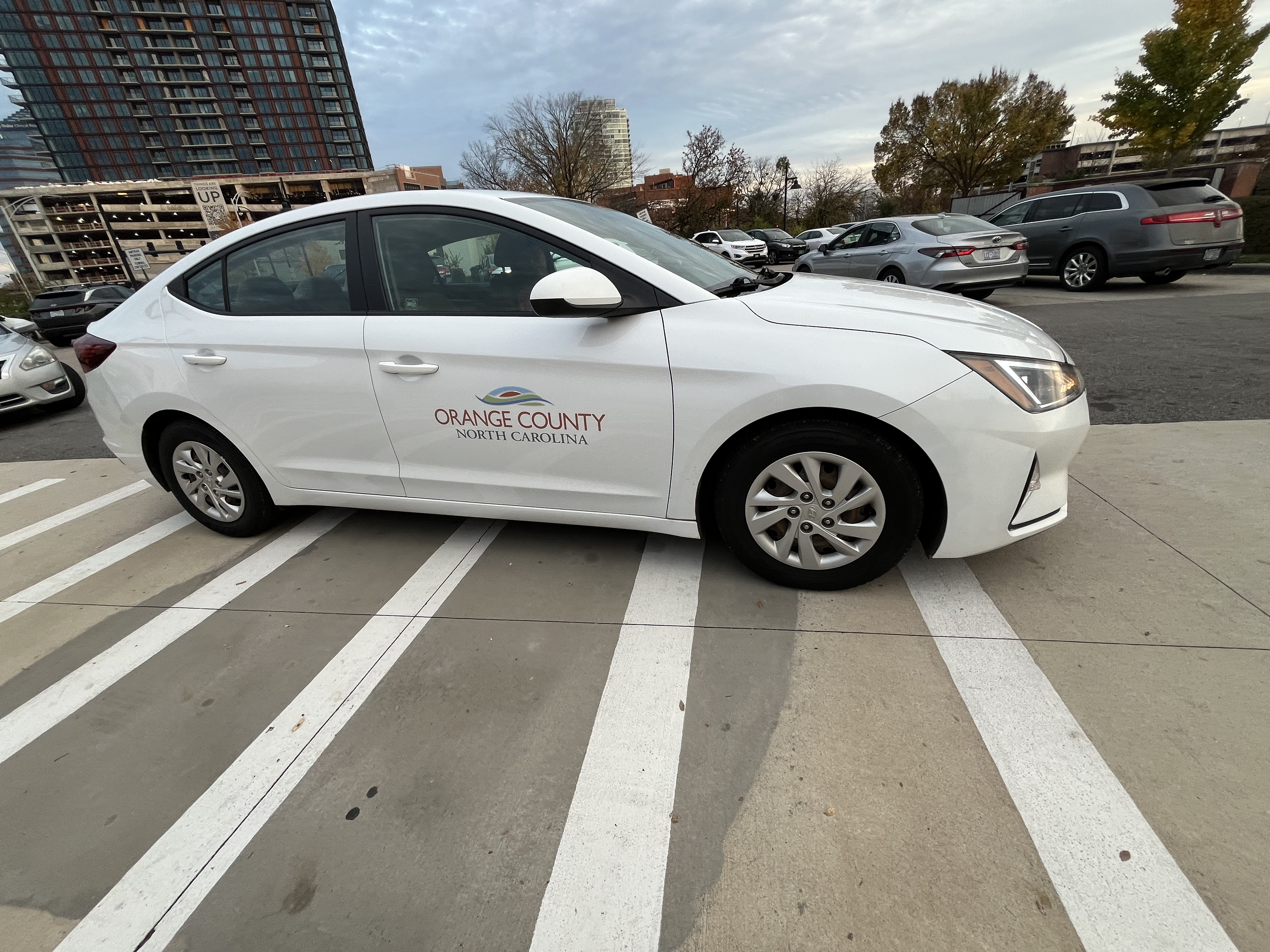

All routes serve Downtown Hillsborough. This area is served by GoTriangle's 405, 420, and ODX routes during peak hours only.

== Rail transit planning ==
=== Durham–Orange Light Rail Transit ===
GoTriangle was planning a 17.7-mile (28.5 km) light rail line between the University of North Carolina at Chapel Hill and East Durham, traveling through Duke University and paralleling the North Carolina Railroad alignment through Durham and proceeding to North Carolina Central University (NCCU). The original project was estimated at $1.4 billion (in 2011). The final project was estimated to cost $2.5 billion (year of expenditure) or $141 million per mile with an annual operating cost of $28.7 million. The line would have had a connection to Amtrak via its station in Durham.

A final environmental impact statement was released by GoTriangle in February 2016, projecting 23,020 daily trips in 2040. The plan was amended to extend to NCCU in November 2016, projecting 26,880 daily trips in 2040. The line would have had 18 stations (4 stations in Orange County, 14 stations in Durham County); end-to-end travel time would have been 42–44 minutes. The line was projected to begin construction in 2020 and be complete by 2028 but ultimately was discontinued in April 2019.

=== Commuter rail ===
After the failure of the Durham–Orange Light Rail project, GoTriangle began studying the possibility of instating a commuter rail service which would serve Durham, Raleigh, Cary, Morrisville, Research Triangle Park, and Garner, possibly as far as Clayton. In 2023, the Federal Transit Administration revealed that it would not be providing funds for rail construction, citing the downturn in transit utilization following the COVID-19 pandemic. Officials indicated that bus rapid transit projects would be encouraged to proceed for providing transit in the area.
