= R-Line =

R-Line or R Line may refer to:

- R-Line (Capital Area Transit), a bus service in Raleigh, North Carolina, US
- R-Line (Norfolk Southern), a railway line in the United States
- R-Line (RIPTA), a Rapid Bus service in Rhode Island, US
- R Line (RTD), a light rail line in Colorado, US
- R (New York City Subway service)
- R (Los Angeles Railway), a former streetcar service in Los Angeles, California, US
- Ramal (Madrid Metro), shuttle subway line in Madrid, Spain
- Transilien Line R, a railway line in the Île-de-France region of France
- VW R-Line, a branding for Volkswagen sport or high performance models
