= GoTransit (North Carolina) =

Bus service serving Research Triangle, North Carolina

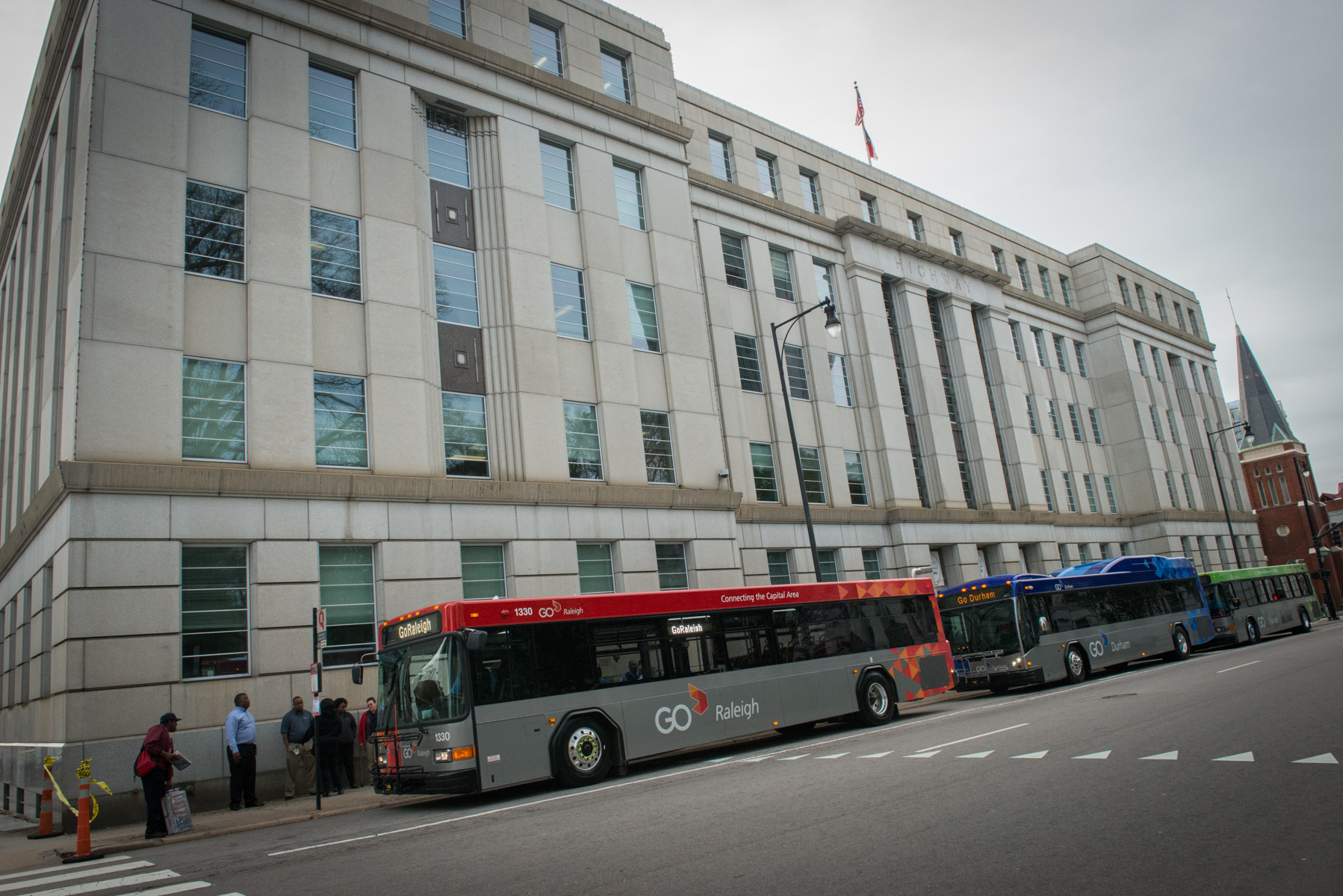
- GoTriangle, GoRaleigh, and GoDurham buses at a 2015 press event
- Founded: 2015
- Headquarters: 4600 Emperor Blvd. Suite 100, Durham, NC 27703
- Locale: Research Triangle, NC
- Service type: bus service
- Website: http://www.gotransitnc.org

GoTransit is a joint branding of municipal and regional bus systems adopted in 2015 for the Research Triangle region of North Carolina. The original participating systems are GoTriangle, formerly Triangle Transit; GoRaleigh, formerly Capital Area Transit (CAT); and GoDurham, formerly Durham Area Transit Authority (DATA). GoCary was rebranded from Cary Transit(C-Tran) in October 2016. Chapel Hill Transit has decided to not adopt the Go branding. The new Bus rapid transit system in Raleigh, NC will operate under "Go+."

The systems remain operationally separate although they coordinate schedules and, in some cases, offer joint fares.

In addition, alternative means of transportation in the Triangle are being rebranded GoSmart and the T-Linx paratransit service is being rebranded GoLinx.
