= R-Line (Capital Area Transit) =

- Service area: downtown Raleigh
- Service type: bus service
- Stops: 15
- Operator: GoRaleigh

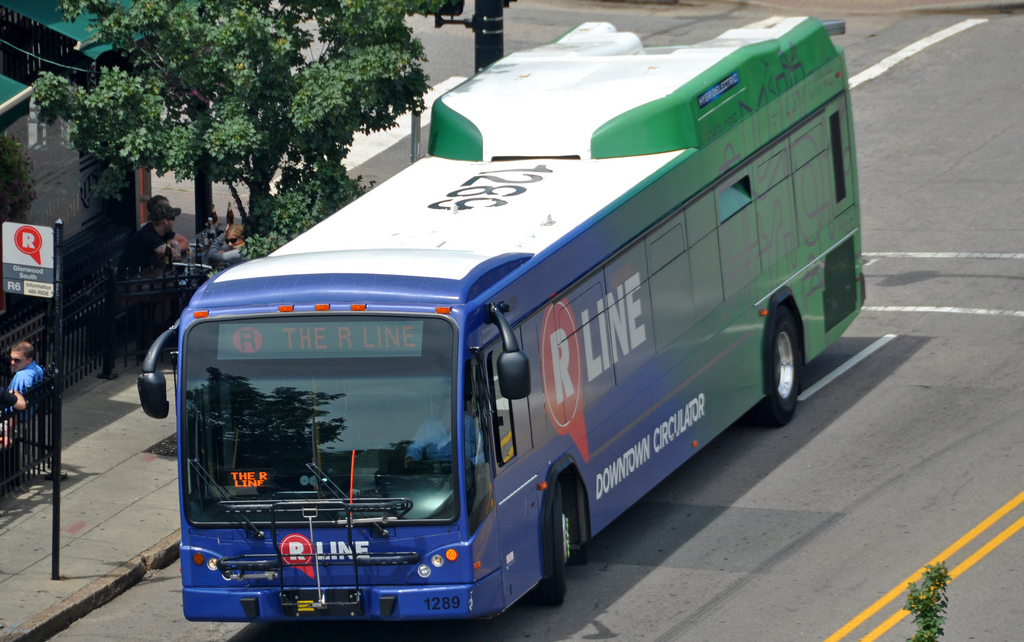
R-Line circulator bus service in Raleigh, NC.

The R-Line is a circulator bus service that traverses a three-mile loop in the shape of an inverted U through downtown Raleigh, North Carolina. Service runs every 15 minutes from 7 AM to 11:30 PM Monday through Wednesday, 7 AM to 2:15 AM Thursday through Saturday, and 1 PM to 8 PM Sunday.

The R-line was suspended in January 2021 and resumed in May 2024. The service had been zero-fare since inception, but regular fare collection began on July 1, 2024.

The circulator originally used three green-painted, specially branded hybrid-electric buses that served specially branded bus stops. As of October 2025, however, the circulator uses the generic GoRaleigh branding.

== Major Stops ==
As of October 2025, the list of stops included:

- R1 - Raleigh Union Station and Contemporary Art Museum of Raleigh
- R2 - Raleigh Municipal Building
- R3 - Campbell University School of Law
- R8 - William Peace University
- R12 - State Capitol, North Carolina Museum of Natural Sciences and North Carolina Museum of History
- R14 - Raleigh Convention Center, Red Hat Amphitheater, Duke Energy Center for the Performing Arts, and Shaw University
