= Durham Technical Community College =

Public college in Durham, North Carolina, US

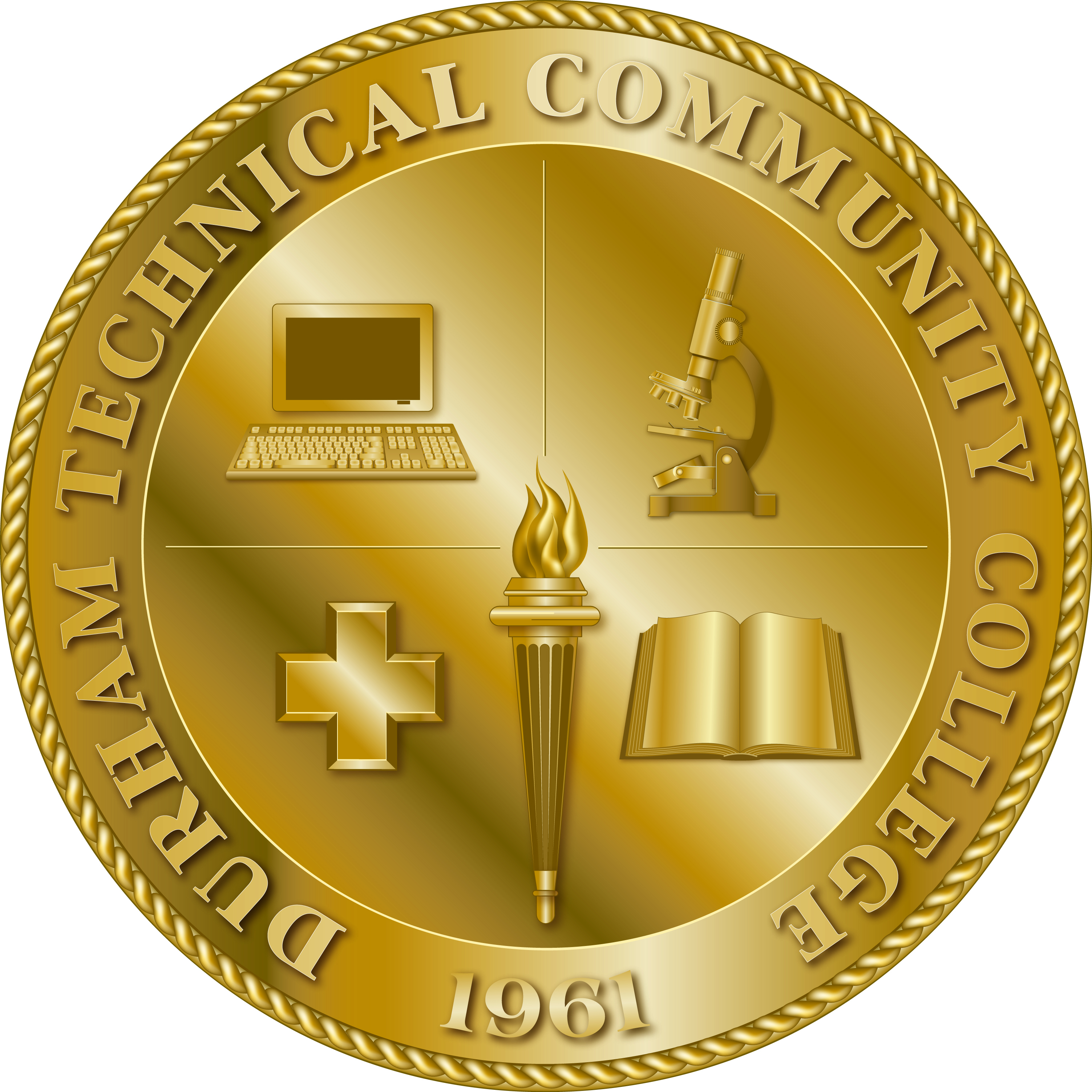
- Former names: Durham Industrial Education Center (1961-1965); Durham Technical Institute (1965-1986)
- Type: Public community college
- Established: September 5, 1961; 64 years ago
- Parent institution: North Carolina Community College System
- Accreditation: SACS
- President: John B. Buxton
- Faculty: 717
- Students: 4,354
- Location: Durham, North Carolina, U.S. 35.975°N 78.881°W
- Campus: Urban 75 acres (0.3 km^{2})
- Colors: Green, orange, white
- Nickname: Durham Tech
- Website: www.durhamtech.edu

Durham Technical Community College (Durham Tech) is a public community college in Durham, North Carolina. The college serves Northern Durham County at its Northern Durham Center, and in Orange County at its Orange County Campus completed in 2008.

Durham Tech serves nearly 20,000 students with curriculum and continuing education offerings. It offers career programs leading to more than 100 degrees, certificates, and diplomas and university transfer programs. Durham Tech is a charter member of the North Carolina Community College System and is accredited by the Southern Association of Colleges and Schools.

As of 2014, the college had nearly 500 full-time and part-time faculty members and 3,900 matriculated students. A large portion of Durham Tech students are part-time. To give them flexibility, the college has a large distance education program, offering numerous online courses and hybrid courses.

== History ==
On September 5, 1961, the institution was founded as Durham Industrial Education Center. On March 30, 1965, the institution changed its name to Durham Technical Institute, at the specification of the State Board of Education. On July 22, 1986, the institution changed its name to Durham Technical Community College, when the North Carolina General Assembly approved Durham Tech's request to add a university transfer program.

=== Presidents and directors ===
- 1961–1975: Harold K. Collins
- 1975–1980: John Crumpton
- November 1980–December 2007: Phail Wynn, Jr.
- January 2008–June 2020: Bill Ingram
- July 2020–present: John B. Buxton

== Notable alumni ==
- Crystal Mangum - false accuser in the Duke lacrosse case and convicted murderer.
- Elizabeth A. Fenn - 2015 Pulitzer Prize in History winner and Chair of History Department at the University of Colorado at Boulder
