= GoRaleigh =

Transit system in Raleigh, North Carolina, USA

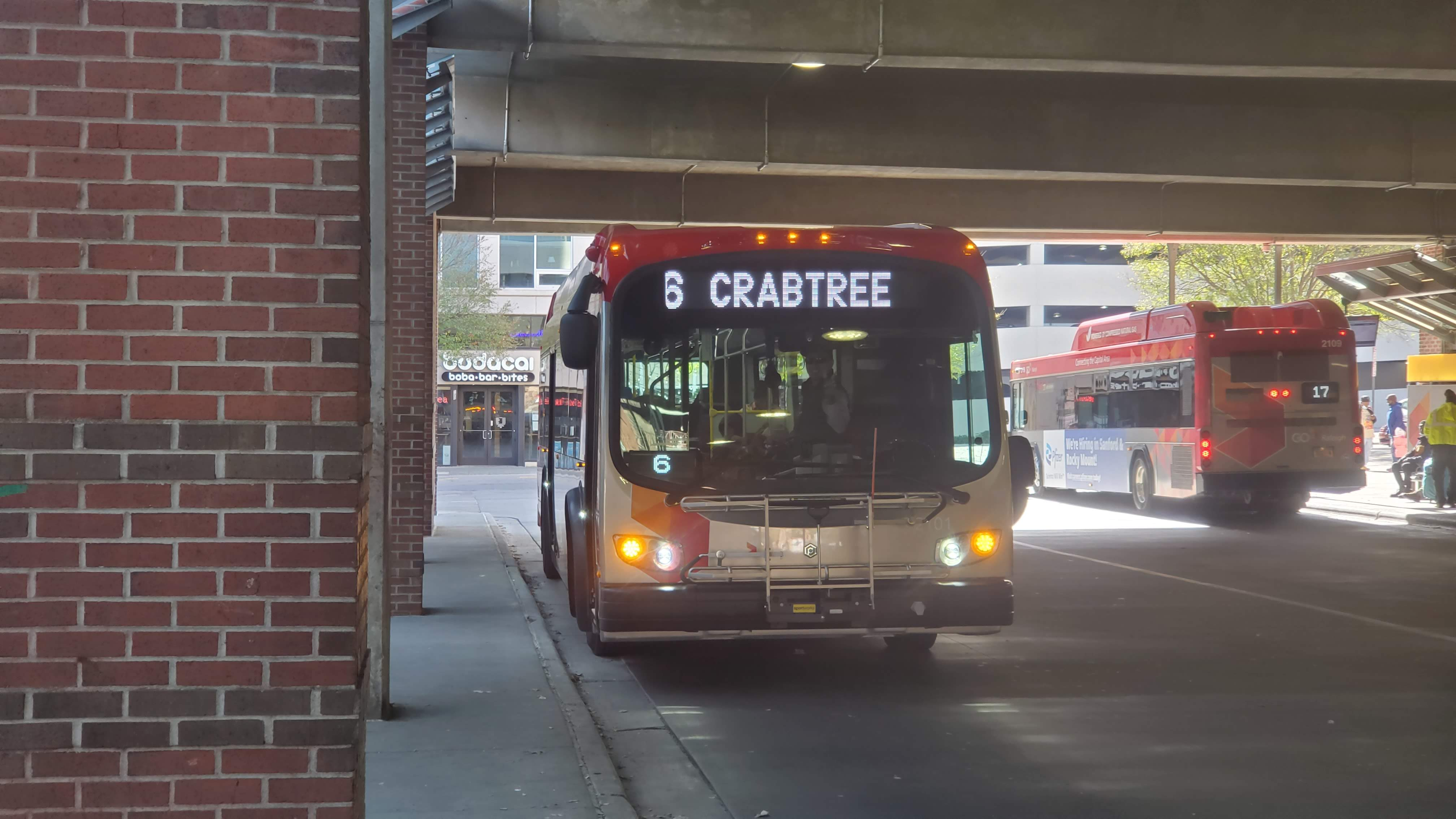
- GoRaleigh #2101 operating on Route 6
- Founded: 1881
- Headquarters: GoRaleigh Operational Facility 4104 Poole Road Raleigh, NC 27610
- Locale: Raleigh, North Carolina; United States
- Service area: 125 square miles
- Service type: bus service, express bus service, park and ride
- Alliance: Raleigh Transit Authority
- Routes: 38
- Stops: 1,400
- Hubs: GoRaleigh Station (214 South Blount Street); Raleigh Union Station (future)
- Stations: GoRaleigh Station & Crabtree Mall
- Fleet: 165
- Daily ridership: 24,500 (weekdays, Q1 2026)
- Annual ridership: 7,991,200 (2025)
- Fuel type: Biodiesel, Electricity, Hybrid, CNG
- Operator: RATP Dev
- Website: goraleigh.org

GoRaleigh is the transit system responsible for operating most of the public transportation services in Raleigh, North Carolina. The system operates 38 fixed routes throughout the city's municipal area and operates several regional/express routes in partnership with GoTriangle, the regional provider. GoRaleigh was previously contracted to operate an additional route in the Town of Wake Forest, a local circulator service which was replaced by "Go Wake Forest" a microtransit pilot program in October 2024.

Capital Area Transit, also known as CAT, was rebranded to GoRaleigh in 2015 under the consolidated GoTransit, a joint branding of municipal and regional transit systems for the Research Triangle. In 2025, the system had a ridership of 7,991,200, or about 24,500 per weekday as of the first quarter of 2026.

GoRaleigh is developing a bus rapid transit (BRT) system, covering approximately 20 miles with dedicated bus lanes, traffic signal priority, frequent service, off-board fare collection, and specialized buses with higher capacity. The first line, the New Bern Avenue Corridor, began construction in 2025 and is planned to open by 2030. Other corridors are in various stages of development.

== History ==
=== Early days ===
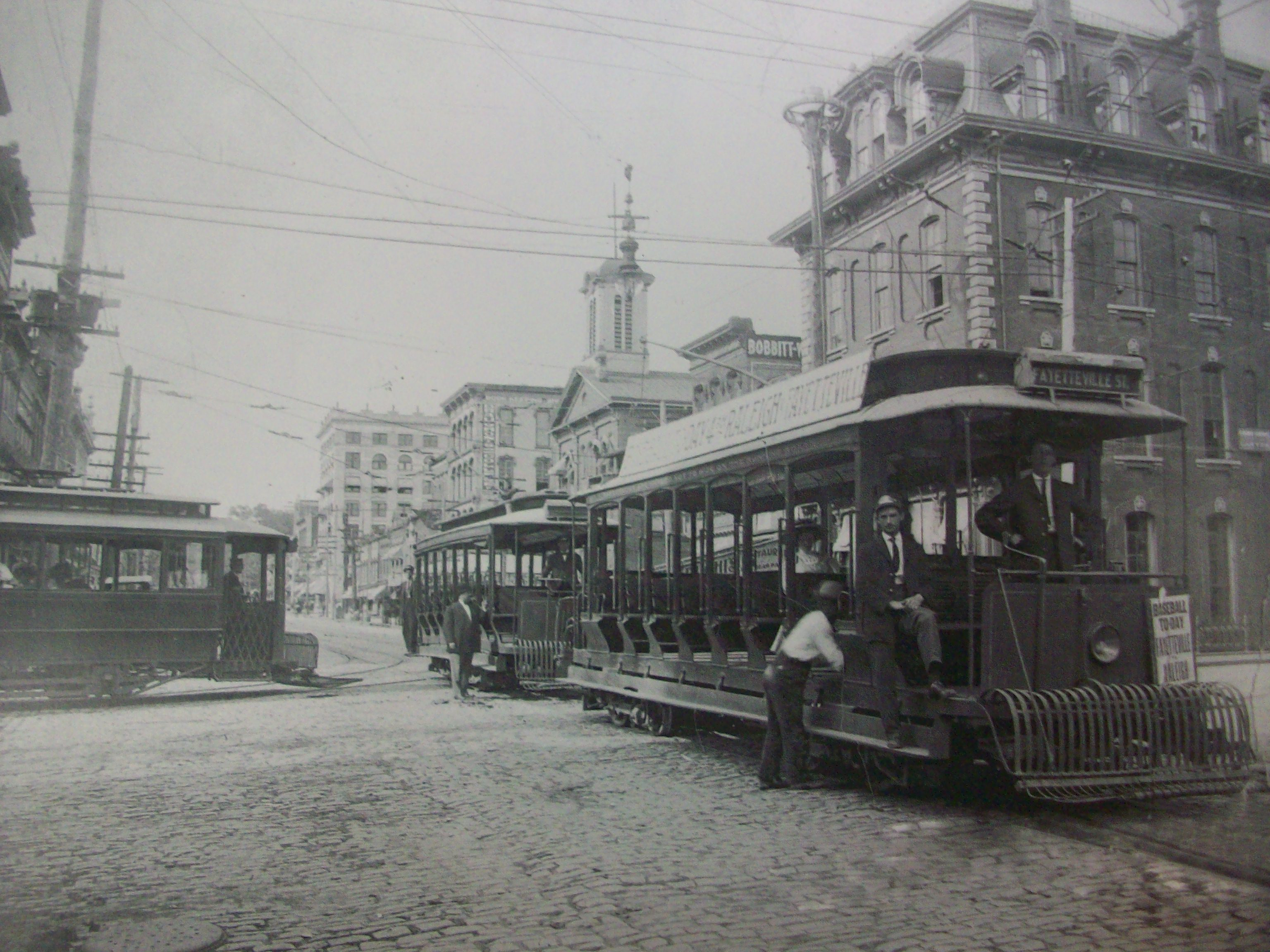
Electric street cars on Fayetteville Street, Raleigh, NC in 1910.

Previous to the GoRaleigh system, Carolina Power & Light Company provided public transit to the city, starting in 1886 with mule-drawn vehicles and covering routes in 1 square mile (3 km^{2}) of central Raleigh. In 1891, the mule-drawn service came to an end, and the electric streetcar service began. The streetcars served several routes, covering about 2 square miles (5 km^{2}) of the city. Due to rapid advances in automotive technology at that time, in 1933 all electric streetcar services ended, replaced by gasoline-powered buses. Ridership remained strong until the 1950s, when the popularity of private vehicles began to reduce transit ridership nationwide.

- 1881–1894 – Raleigh Street Railway
- 1894–1908 – Raleigh Electric Co.
- 1908–1921 – Carolina Power & Light Co.
- 1921–1925 – Carolina Power & Light Co. (Electric Bond & Shares Co.)
- 1925–1946 – Carolina Power & Light Co. (National Power & Light Co.), operating from 126 N. West Street, Raleigh
- 1930s – streetcars discontinued
- 1946–1950 – Carolina Power & Light Company (CP&L).
- 1950–1958 – White Transportation Co.
- 1958–1975 – Raleigh City Coach Lines (City Coach Lines, Inc.)
- 1975–2015 – City of Raleigh/Capital Area Transit
- 2015–present – City of Raleigh/GoRaleigh

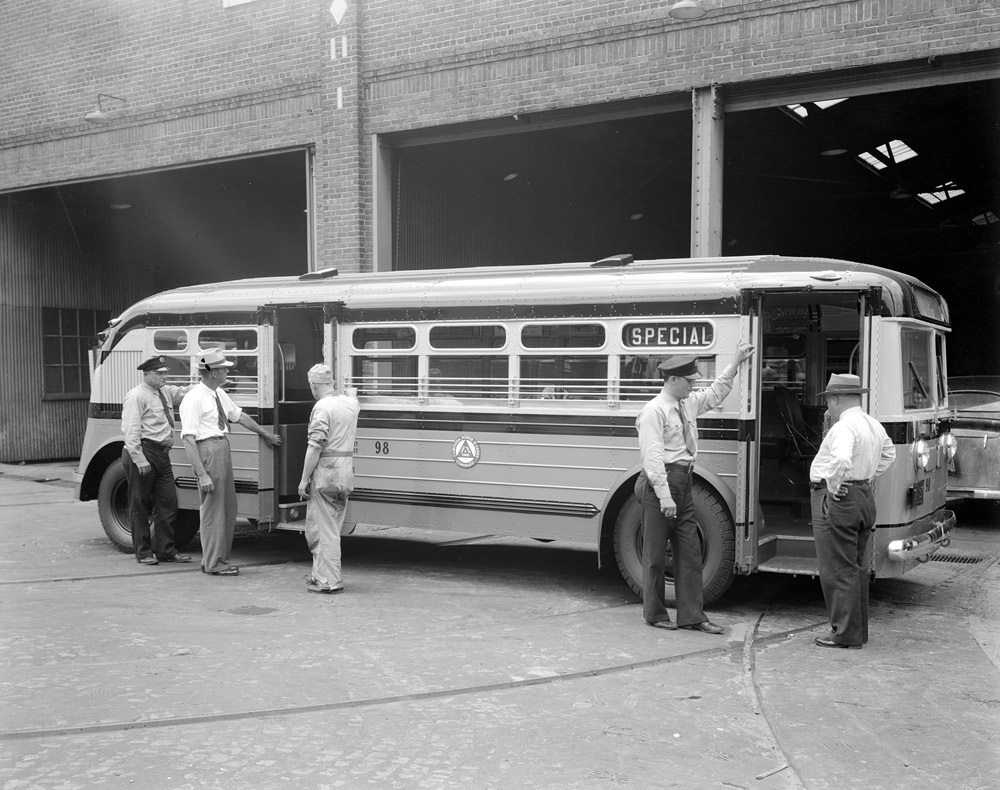
A newly delivered bus, built by Twin Coach, is inspected in 1941 at the Carolina Power & Light Car Barn and Automotive Garage in downtown Raleigh. The building, located at 126 N. West Street, is now the home to Clouds Brewing.

In the mid- to late 20th century, CP&L ended its operation of transit services in the city, and the current publicly owned Capital Area Transit system was created. Capital Area Transit formerly rebranded its system to GoRaleigh in 2015.

=== Five-year plan ===
In 2002, Capital Area Transit (CAT) spent $200,000 to hire consultants to come up with a five-year plan to improve public transit in Raleigh. At that time, most bus schedules were ten years out of date. It wasn't until fiscal year 2006 that the city council gave CAT the additional funding needed to begin implementing year one of a five-year plan. At the start of the fiscal year 2007, Raleigh City Council gave CAT the additional funding needed for year two of the five-year plan (which took effect on bus routes in January, 2007).

Despite the city budget providing CAT with additional funding for year three of the five-year plan for the fiscal year 2008 (July 2007-June 2008) and additional funding for year four of the five-year plan for the last quarter of the fiscal year 2009, these changes were never implemented because tax revenues had been lower than expected and the funds were not available.

The city budget for the fiscal year 2010 notes that "The FY 2010 budget represents the implementation of delayed transit services from last year... year three of the Transit Plan will begin January 2010 and will result in reduced headways on Route 15 Wake Med, a new route in Southeast Raleigh, and a series of other small service changes." However, the implementation of these changes continues to be delayed due to budget shortfalls.

In May 2008, the North Carolina Board of Transportation awarded CAT with $3.5 million for 13 additional buses (which CAT received in June, 2009) and $2.8 million to purchase land and design a new administration building and garage, which is now located on 23 acres (93,000 m^{2}) off of Poole Road. Additionally, $7.6 million of stimulus money has been awarded to CAT towards the garage. In May 2011, the new facility was opened.

On August 6, 2017, GoRaleigh expanded its Sunday service as described in the first round improvements of the Wake County Transit Plan.

== Current system ==
=== Layout ===
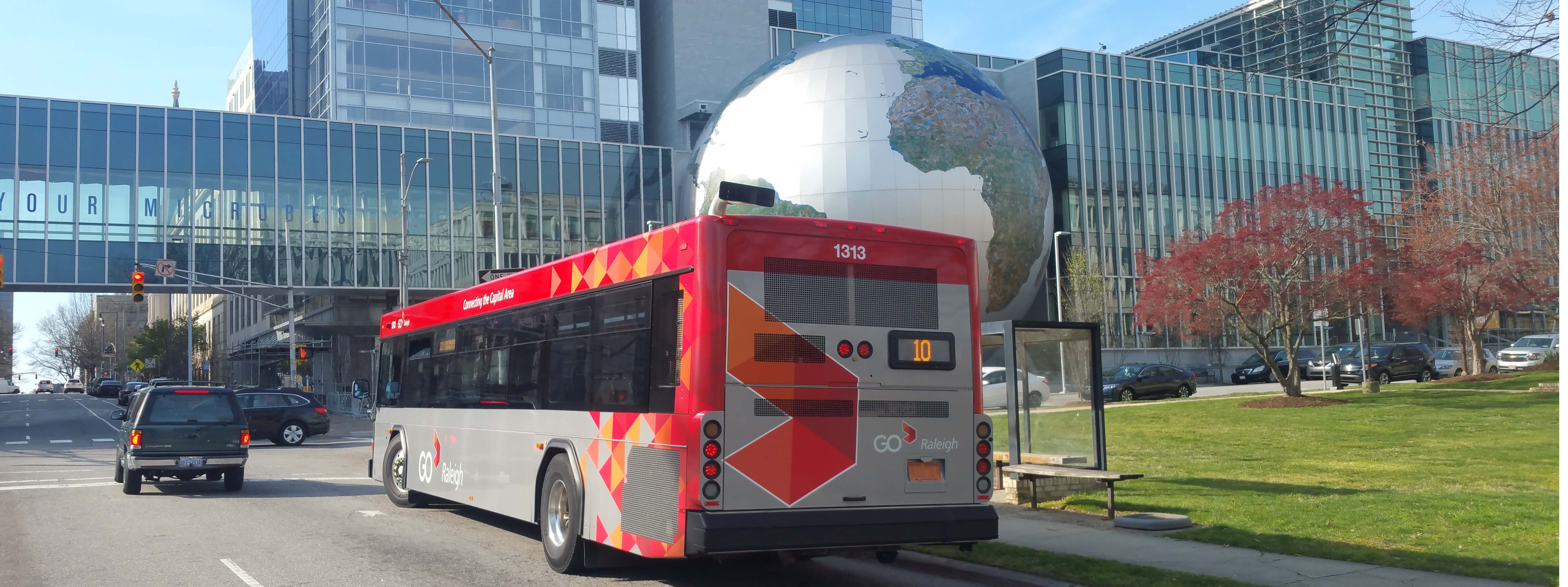
Standard GoRaleigh bus at the North Carolina Museum of Natural Sciences.

GoRaleigh provides public transportation to areas known colloquially as inside the beltline and outside I-440, as well as contracted service to Wake Tech Community College. The system operates on a hub and spoke-style layout, with most routes beginning and ending at the newly renovated GoRaleigh Station, formerly known as Moore Square Station, in downtown Raleigh. The "L" routes circulate through an area or operate as a cross-town route and link with one or more "spoke" routes. The "X" routes are express routes which operate non-stop or with limited stops along the body of the route. Stops on these routes are generally available only at the beginning and end points of the route. Longer distance routes are operated by the intercounty GoTriangle system.

GoRaleigh publicly posts its General Transit Feed Specification (GTFS) data so riders can easily plan their trips using services such as Google Transit in Google Maps. GoRaleigh also supports the Transit App that offers real-time bus location through its GPS equipped fleet and crowdsourced data.

=== High-Frequency Network ===
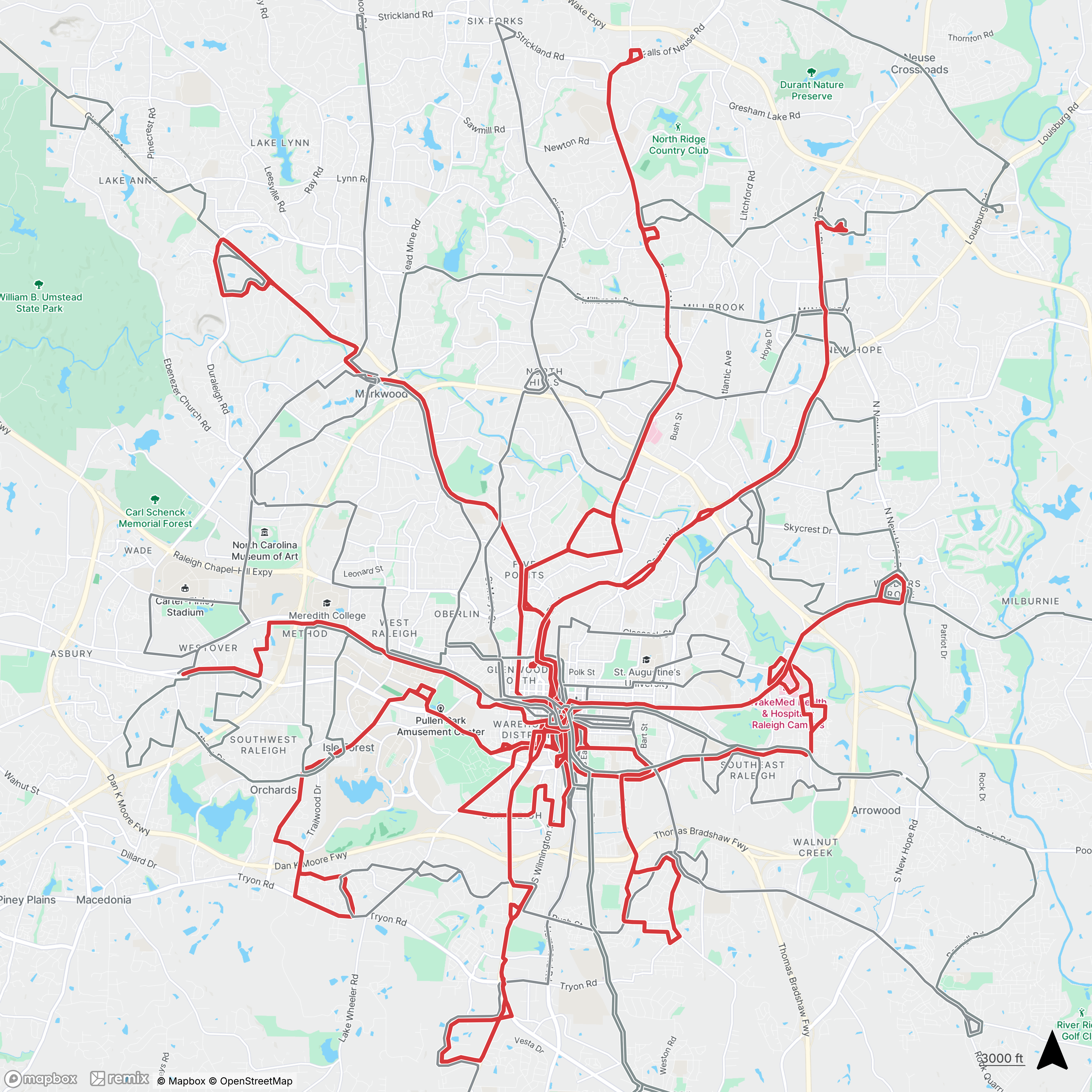
The GoRaleigh high-frequency network, as of March 2026, displayed in red alongside the rest of the fixed route network in grey.

GoRaleigh's high-frequency network operates 15-minute service or better. In January 2024, the high-frequency network consisted of three routes spanning 40 miles. As of March 2026, the high-frequency network has expanded to 11 routes totaling 137 miles. Route 1 (Capital Boulevard) operates with service every 10 minutes.

=== The R-Line ===
See main article R-Line (Capital Area Transit).

The R-Line began service on February 13, 2009. The route is served by three specially designed hybrid-electric buses, powered by bio-diesel fuel. The route resembles an inverted U, with 13 stops in the downtown area. Service frequency is every 15 minutes. In order to maximize frequency two buses operate on the circulator route at all times, while one bus serves as back-up in the event of mechanical failure. The R-Line is a free circulator service. The service was suspended from January 2021 to May 2024.

=== GoRaleigh Station ===
Renovations to GoRaleigh Station, formerly known as Moore Square Station, were completed May, 2017. What was once a cavernous tunnel that lacked informational signs was transformed into a spacious terminal with additional seating and LCD monitors that provide real time bus arrival information. The station is accessible to pedestrians from Blount Street, Hargett Street, Wilmington Street or Martin Street and features a centrally located information and ticket booth staffed by GoRaleigh employees.

The bus station was re-designed to accommodate more buses and more riders as a result of the Wake Transit Plan, which county voters approved in 2016. The station currently serves 35 bus routes per day and nearly 80 buses per hour during peak hours. The station is designed to support up to 150 buses per hour once the Wake County Transit Plan is fully implemented.

=== Fares ===
The basic fare is $1.25 one-way, beginning July 1, 2024. There are several discount and pass programs.

== Bus rapid transit ==
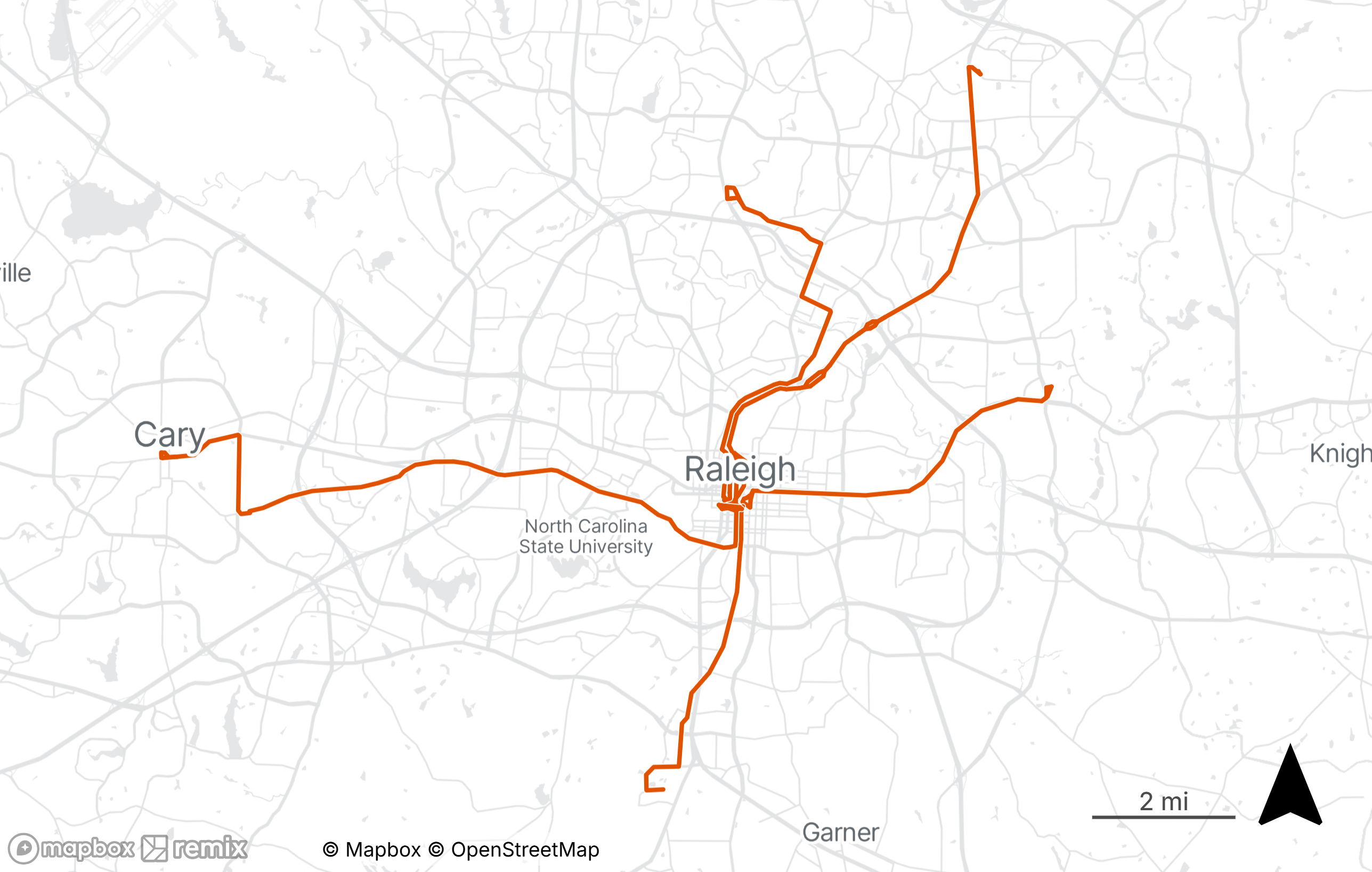
Future GoRaleigh BRT routes.

In May 2015, Wake County held town halls on whether to expand its transit system with light rail or bus rapid transit (BRT). A half-cent sales tax increase to finance transit was approved by voters in 2016. A plan to build four lines of BRT, totaling 20 miles, was revealed in May 2018. The county released a plan to begin construction on the New Bern Avenue line, connecting downtown Raleigh to WakeMed's Raleigh campus, and continue planning for the other three lines in January 2020. A southern line to Garner, a western line to downtown Cary, and a northern line to North Hills and Triangle Town Center are planned.

Work on the construction of the New Bern Avenue line began in November 2023. Construction faced delays as the city did not receive any bids for the project until July 2025. Phase One of construction began in August 2025. The line is scheduled to begin service in 2030.

== Funding ==
For FY 2010, CAT's operating budget was $15,439,636, a 1% decrease from the previous fiscal year's budget of $15,596,444. This ended a four-year streak in which CAT had seen an increase in funding to meet the demands of the five-year plan. Of CAT's budget, $10,369,966 is from the city, with additional funding coming from the state, passenger revenue (estimated farebox revenue for FY 2010 is $2,480,623, but it is unclear whether this includes bus pass sales or GoPass contracts, as in past city budgets this was separated), and miscellaneous sources (such as grants and advertising).

== Ridership ==
Ridership for GoRaleigh 2002–2018

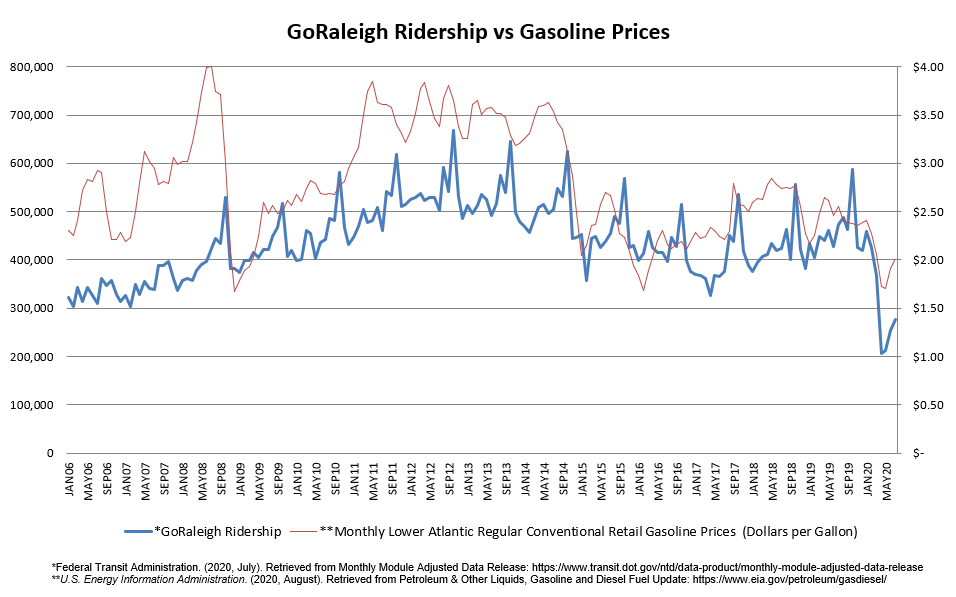
Comparison of GoRaleigh ridership to average mid-Atlantic region gasoline prices

According to the Raleigh City budget for the fiscal year 2010, ridership levels averaged over 14,000 each business day, up from 13,000 for the fiscal year of 2008, 11,000 in 2005 (when gas prices began to climb after Hurricane Katrina), and 8,000 in 2002.

== Other transit services in Raleigh ==
=== GoRaleigh Access ===
GoRaleigh Access, formerly Accessible Raleigh Transportation (ART), is the City of Raleigh's transportation service for people with disabilities. GoRaleigh Access programs help ensure an outstanding quality of life for everyone in the City of Raleigh. GoRaleigh Access enables eligible persons to access public transportation. GoRaleigh Access trips are eligible for paratransit service only if the trip begins and ends within 3/4 miles of a GoRaleigh bus stop.

=== GoTriangle ===
GoTriangle (formerly Triangle Transit or the Triangle Transit Authority), is a regional transit service that connects Raleigh with neighboring cities, suburbs, Raleigh-Durham International Airport and Research Triangle Park. GoTriangle also organizes a vanpool program serving the Research Triangle metropolitan region.

=== Wolfline ===
The Wolfline operates nearly a dozen routes that serve the NCSU (North Carolina State University) community and surrounding areas in west Raleigh. In addition to serving NCSU students, faculty and staff, the Wolfline system is available for use by the general public.

=== Pepsi Caniac Coach ===
The Pepsi Caniac Coach were shuttles that provided transportation between Downtown Raleigh and North Hills restaurants to the PNC Arena on Carolina Hurricanes gamedays and other events at the arena. The two routes started in 2013 due to a lack of public transit to the arena. The service is free for diners who purchase Pepsi-branded beverages at participating restaurants.
