= Natural Bridge Battlefield Historic State Park =

State park in Florida, United States

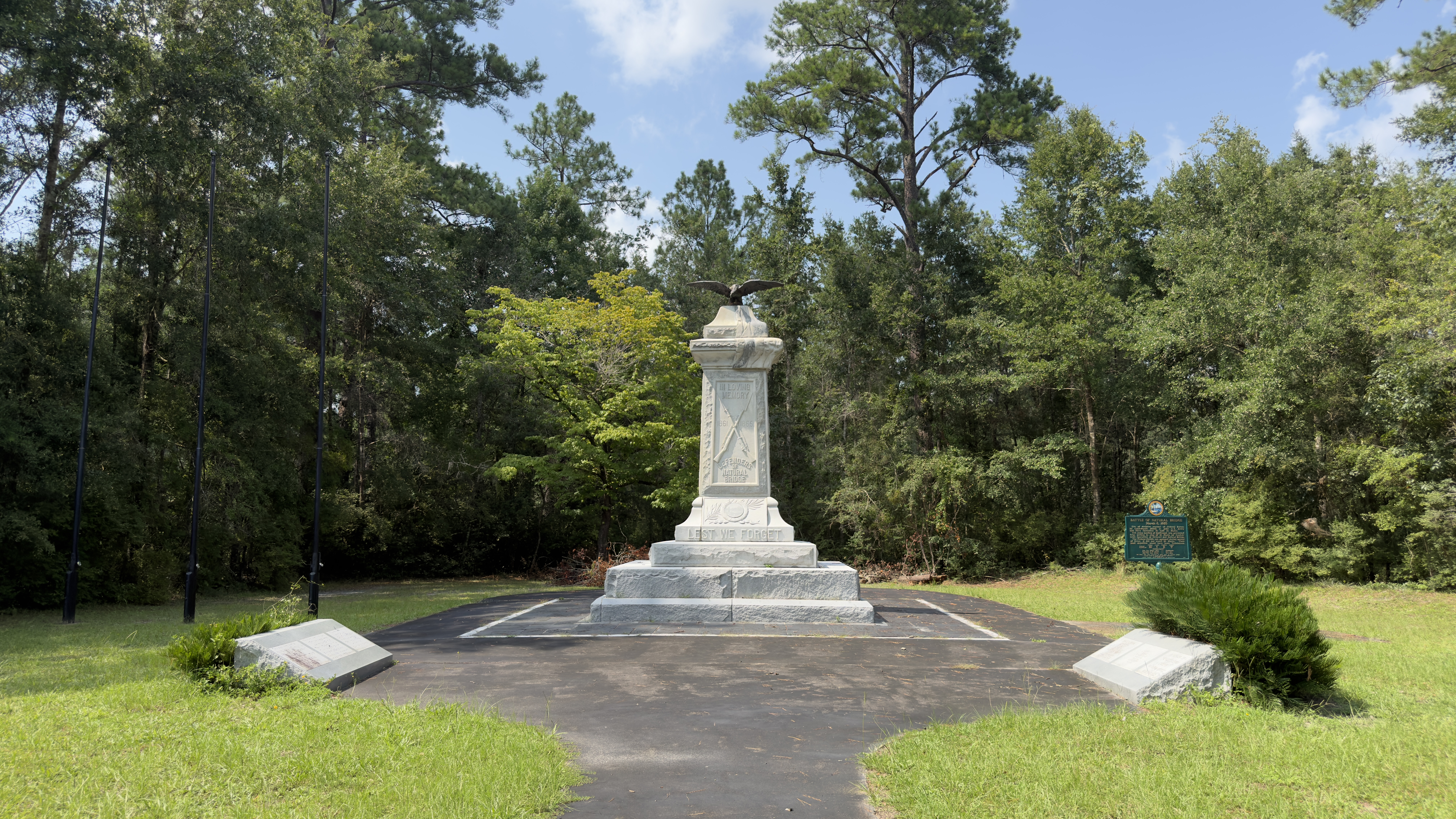
- Confederate monument at the park, erected by the Anna Jackson Chapter of the United Daughters of the Confederacy in 1922

- Location within Florida Location within the United States
- Interactive map of Natural Bridge Battlefield Historic State Park
- Location: Leon County, Florida, USA
- Nearest city: Tallahassee
- Coordinates: 30°17′02″N 84°09′07″W
- Area: 2,121.37 acres (858.49 ha)
- Established: 1950; 76 years ago
- Visitors: 6,251 (in 2014–15)
- Governing body: Florida Department of Environmental Protection
- Website: https://www.floridastateparks.org/parks-and-trails/natural-bridge-battlefield-historic-state-park
- Natural Bridge Battlefield
- U.S. National Register of Historic Places
- Built: 1865
- NRHP reference No.: 70000188
- Added to NRHP: 29 September 1970

Natural Bridge Battlefield Historic State Park is a 2,121.37 acres (858.49 ha) Florida state park in unincorporated Leon County, about 15 mi (24 km) southeast of Tallahassee and near the community of Woodville. The park takes its name from a natural bridge where the St. Marks River disappears into a series of sinkholes, flows about 0.6 mi (0.97 km) underground through a cave system, and re-emerges at the St. Marks River Rise just south of the park boundary.

The park preserves the site of the Battle of Natural Bridge, fought on March 6, 1865, in the closing weeks of the American Civil War. A Confederate force made up of regular cavalry, militia, reserves, and volunteers, including cadets from the West Florida Seminary (later Florida State University), turned back a Union column of United States Colored Troops and Florida Union cavalry attempting to cross the St. Marks River en route to Tallahassee and the port of St. Marks. The Union repulse is credited with allowing Tallahassee to remain the only Confederate state capital east of the Mississippi River that was never captured by Union forces.

The park is classified by the Florida Park Service as a "special feature site" and is managed for the joint protection of its cultural and geological resources. It hosts an annual reenactment of the battle on the first weekend of March, an event first held in 1975 and staged in cooperation with the Natural Bridge Historical Society and local reenacting units.

== History ==
=== Background ===
By early 1865 the Union blockading squadron on the Gulf coast had come under increasing pressure to shut down the port of St. Marks, which had grown in importance to blockade running after Fort Fisher, North Carolina, fell on January 15 and Wilmington, North Carolina, surrendered a month later. Federal raids launched from Cedar Key in February had drawn a sharp Confederate response: Captain J. J. Dickison engaged Major Edmund C. Weeks's column of the 2nd Florida Cavalry (Union) and the 2nd U.S. Colored Infantry at Station Four on February 13, and on February 20 Confederate horsemen threatened the Federal garrison at Fort Myers.

In response, Brigadier General John Newton, commanding the District of Key West and Tortugas, developed a joint expedition with Acting Rear Admiral Cornelius K. Stribling of the East Gulf Blockading Squadron. Their objective was to capture St. Marks and close the St. Marks River to blockade runners; they thought that a swift movement inland from the coast might also allow the seizure of Tallahassee. The Confederate District of Florida had been reassigned on January 11, 1865, to Major General Samuel Jones, who directed the defense from Tallahassee, with Brigadier General William Miller in immediate command of the state's reserve forces.

News that a Union fleet was off the coast near the St. Marks lighthouse produced sudden mobilization in the Florida capital. Home guards, furloughed soldiers, and cadets from the West Florida Seminary in Tallahassee (later Florida State University) were called into service and moved south to the St. Marks River line.

=== Battle ===
Federal troops began coming ashore near the St. Marks lighthouse on March 4, delayed by fog, gales, and grounded transports. Advancing north on March 5, the Union column of roughly 1,000 men captured the East River bridge and pushed on to Newport, where they found the Newport bridge over the St. Marks River burning and its far bank held by Confederate riflemen in prepared pits. Unable to force the crossing and unwilling to expose his flank to fire from the high ground opposite, Newton turned north in search of another crossing and pushed a night march toward the natural bridge, about 4 to 5 mi (6.4 to 8.0 km) above Newport.

The Confederates anticipated Newton's forces. Lieutenant Colonel George W. Scott of the 5th Florida Cavalry Battalion had been sent ahead to hold the natural bridge, and General Miller followed with the militia, reserves, and two sections of artillery drawn from Abell's, Dunham's, and the Kilcrease batteries; his column reached the crossing at four in the morning on March 6. At daybreak Major Benjamin C. Lincoln of the 2nd U.S. Colored Infantry drove the Confederate outposts back across the bridge, but his advance was halted by a strong line of rifle pits, and his flanking parties found the approaches choked by "sloughs, ponds, marshes, and thickets".

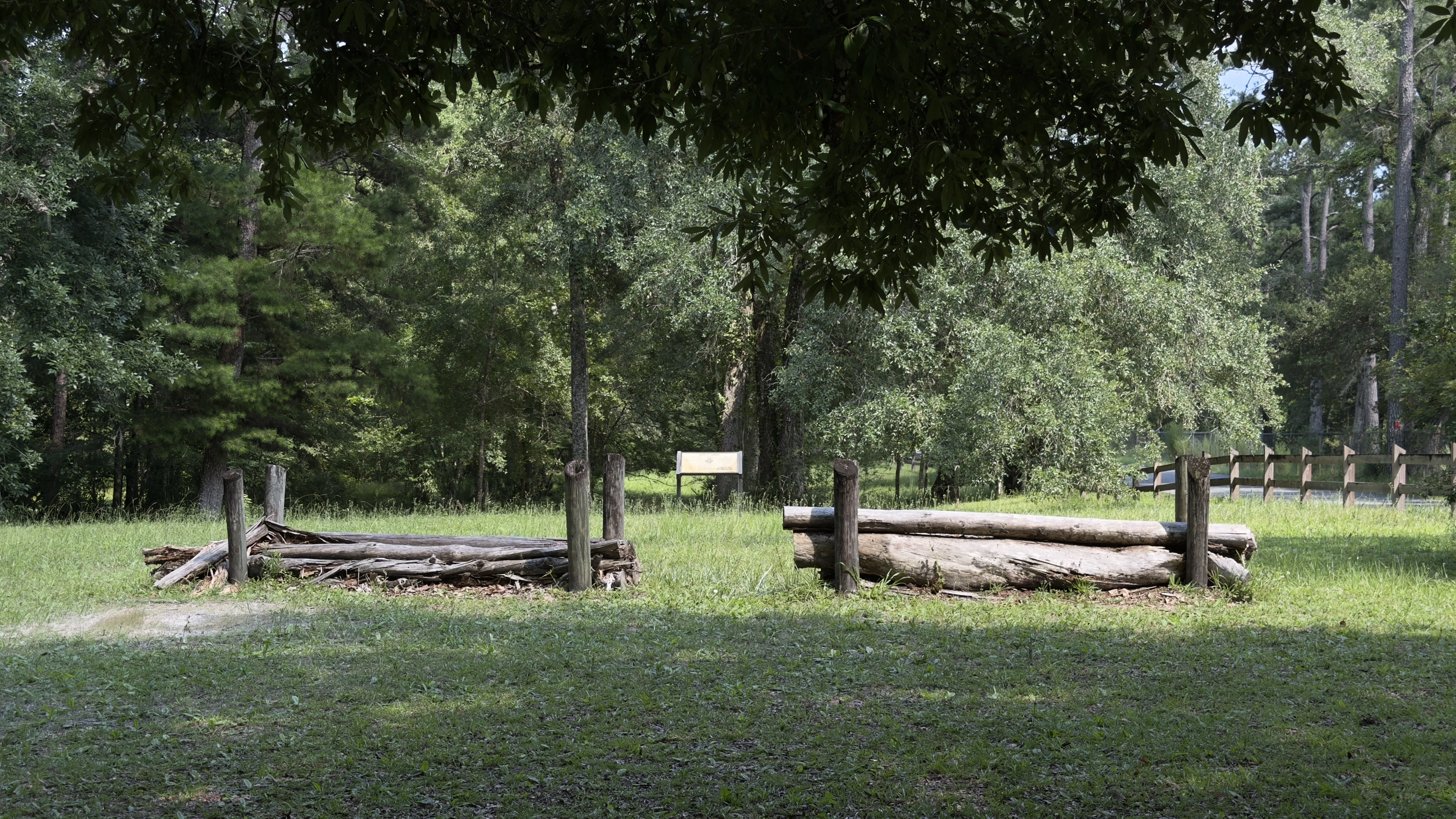
Replica breastworks at the park for Civil War reenactments

General Newton and the Union forces attempted a coordinated attack, sending Colonel Benjamin R. Townsend with three companies of the 2nd U.S. Colored to turn the Confederate right while Lincoln pressed the front with three more companies, supported by the 99th U.S. Colored Infantry as a reserve. Townsend's flanking column was checked by an impassable slough, and Lincoln's frontal attack was broken up, the major himself mortally wounded. Sensing the shift in momentum, Miller then led the Confederates out of their works and across the bridge in a column of assault, but two charges were repulsed by a solid Union line of infantry supported by artillery, and the attackers fell back into their earthworks. The West Florida Seminary cadets, held in reserve near the Confederate center, saw the artillery duel and skirmishing from close range but were not committed to the main attacks and suffered no casualties.

The battle continued as an artillery and skirmish action through the middle of the day, its guns audible in Tallahassee some 18 mi (29 km) away. With ammunition running low, the naval column blocked from providing the flanking landing at Port Leon, and the risk of Confederate raiders cutting his line of retreat, Newton disengaged in the early afternoon and marched back through Newport to the coast, torching the East River bridge behind him. Union losses in the expedition were reported as 148: 21 killed, 89 wounded, and 38 missing. Confederate losses at Natural Bridge itself were three killed and about twenty-two wounded.

=== Outcome and significance ===
The war ended in Virginia a little over a month later, and no further Federal offensives were made against St. Marks or Tallahassee. As a result, Tallahassee held the distinction, at war's end, of being the only Confederate state capital east of the Mississippi River never taken by Union forces, a status widely attributed to the Confederate defense of the natural bridge. The engagement is generally described as the second largest Civil War battle fought in Florida, after the Battle of Olustee in 1864.

The cadets' participation in the battle carries a distinct institutional legacy. On the basis of the West Florida Seminary company's presence in the Confederate line, the Army Reserve Officer Training Corps (ROTC) unit at Florida State University is one of only four Army ROTC programs authorized to carry a Civil War battle streamer, the others belonging to the Virginia Military Institute, The Citadel, and the University of Mississippi.

Two Union sailors from the USS Hendrick Hudson who participated in the operation, Seaman John Mack and Coxswain George Schutt, were subsequently awarded the Medal of Honor for their conduct during the expedition.

=== Park establishment ===
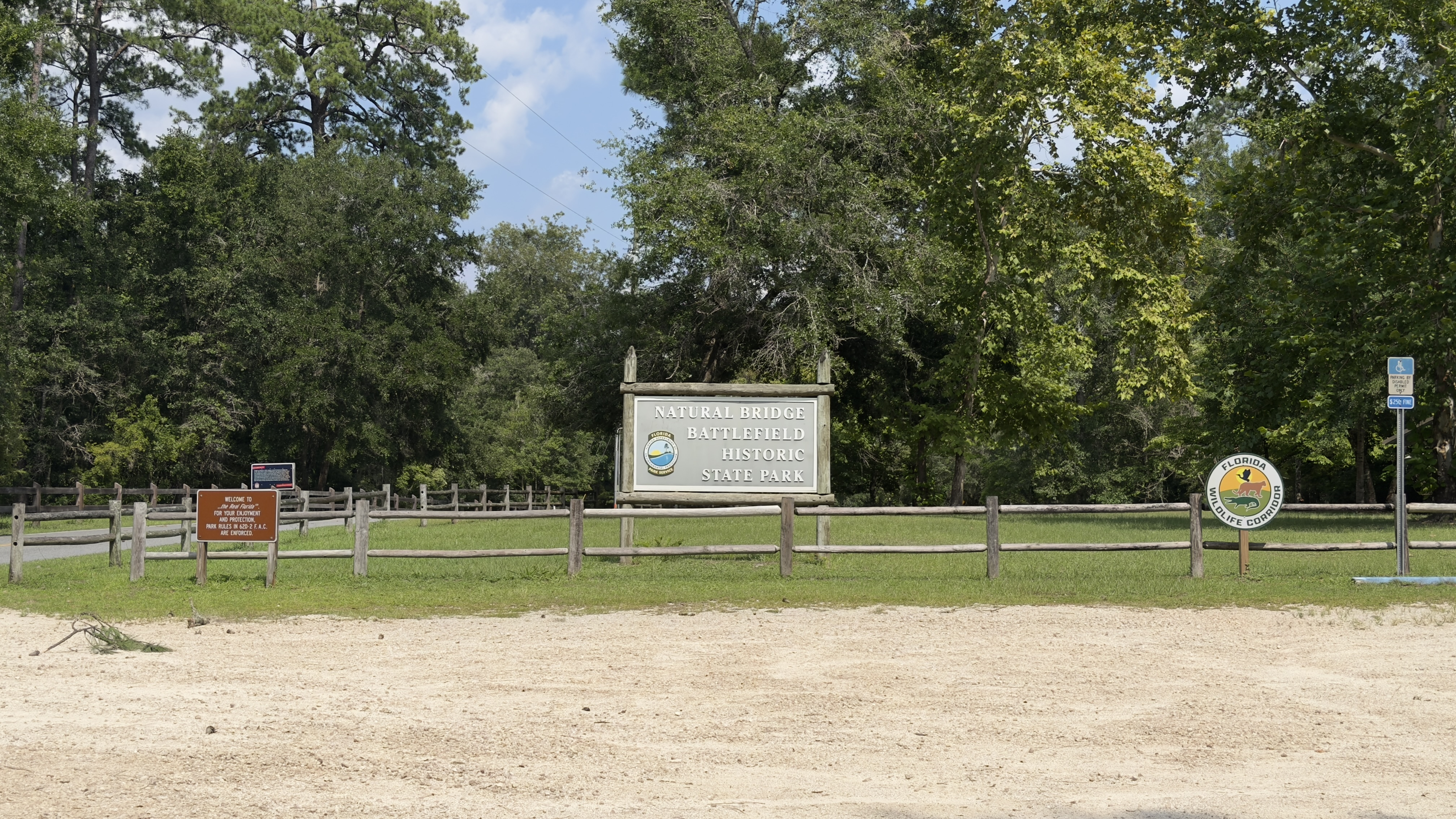
Park entrance sign, with a Florida Wildlife Corridor placard mounted below

Local commemoration of the battle began within a generation of the war. On March 6, 1911, a committee of Confederate veterans and local residents was organized to secure title to the battlefield, and in January 1919 a veteran of the engagement, J. B. Fletcher, formally approached the Anna Jackson Chapter of the United Daughters of the Confederacy for help erecting a permanent memorial. On July 21, 1921, the Florida Legislature appropriated $5,000 for the memorial, entrusting the funds to the chapter, and on April 26, 1922, the Anna Jackson Chapter dedicated a fifteen-foot granite column topped by a copper eagle on the battlefield ground.

The state took possession of the site itself on March 8, 1950, when the Division of Recreation and Parks acquired title to a 6 acres (2.4 ha) parcel donated by the United Daughters of the Confederacy; a further 3-acre (1.2 ha) letter of authorization from the St. Joe Paper Company in 1970 expanded the working area of the park to just over 9 acres (3.6 ha). Title interest was transferred to the Board of Trustees of the Internal Improvement Trust Fund in 1967, and the park was leased back to the Division in 1968 (Lease 2324, later renumbered 3635) for a ninety-nine-year term. The battlefield was listed on the National Register of Historic Places on September 29, 1970, under Criterion A for events of military significance during the period 1850–1874.

The park's modern footprint was assembled by two large post-2000 acquisitions. On February 25, 2009, the state acquired the 22.627 ha (55.913 acres) Rakestraw Tract, which contains most of the sinkhole and karst-window complex on the south side of Natural Bridge Road together with the nineteenth-century canal system that linked the sinks; on September 16, 2011, it added the 22.556 ha (55.736 acres) Gerrell Tract on the east side of the river, which brought the newly named Gerrell Spring and its short spring run into public ownership. The American Battlefield Trust and its predecessor the Civil War Trust have credited themselves and their partners with helping to save 110 acres (45 ha) of the battlefield now within the park.

=== Reenactment ===
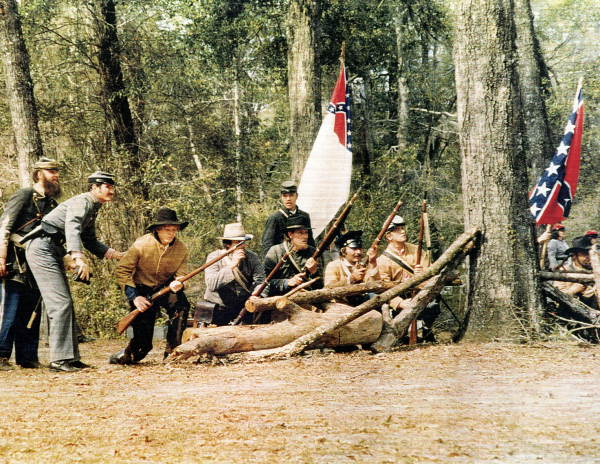
The first reenactment of the Battle of Natural Bridge, staged at the park in 1975

Reenactment of the battle at the park began in 1975 and was placed on an annual footing under the Natural Bridge Historical Society. The Natural Bridge Historical Society was organized in 1978 to raise funds for the site and coordinate the event with local Sons of Confederate Veterans and United Daughters of the Confederacy chapters. The 1922 monument was refurbished in 2011: its badly weathered copper eagle, which was found on removal to be pierced by bullet holes accumulated over decades of exposure, was laser-scanned by cultural-resources staff of the Florida Division of Historical Resources and replaced with a copy, with the original to be conserved for a future protected display; the marble was cleaned and its grout joints repaired the following year.

== Geology ==
The park lies within the Gulf Coastal Lowlands on the Woodville Karst Plain, a gently sloping surface of loose quartz sand thinly veneering a shallow limestone substratum. The Woodville Karst Plain is subdivided into the Lake Munson Hills to the north and the Wakulla Sand Hills to the south; Natural Bridge Battlefield occupies the northern edge of the Wakulla Sand Hills immediately adjacent to the St. Marks River, in an area of relict sand dunes associated with a former higher shoreline. Elevations in the park range from about 10 ft (3.0 m) near the river to slightly above 20 ft (6.1 m) on the sandiest ridges.

The uppermost bedrock is the St. Marks Formation, a fine- to medium-grained silty limestone deposited in the early Miocene about 15 million years ago and made up of at least 90 percent calcium carbonate; the overlying Hawthorn and Miccosukee formations that once capped it have been eroded away, and the St. Marks Formation is now exposed along the river channel and in the walls of the park's sinkholes. Beneath it lies the Oligocene Suwannee Limestone, which holds the principal water supply for Leon County and rests in turn on the late Eocene Crystal River Formation.

Three soils are mapped within the park boundary. The nearly level, poorly drained Chaires fine sand covers most of the uplands on either side of the river; the Talquin fine sand occupies the northeastern corner of the Gerrell Tract; and the very poorly drained, organic-rich Pamlico–Dorovan complex fills the alluvial and bottomland strip adjacent to the St. Marks River channel.

=== Hydrology ===
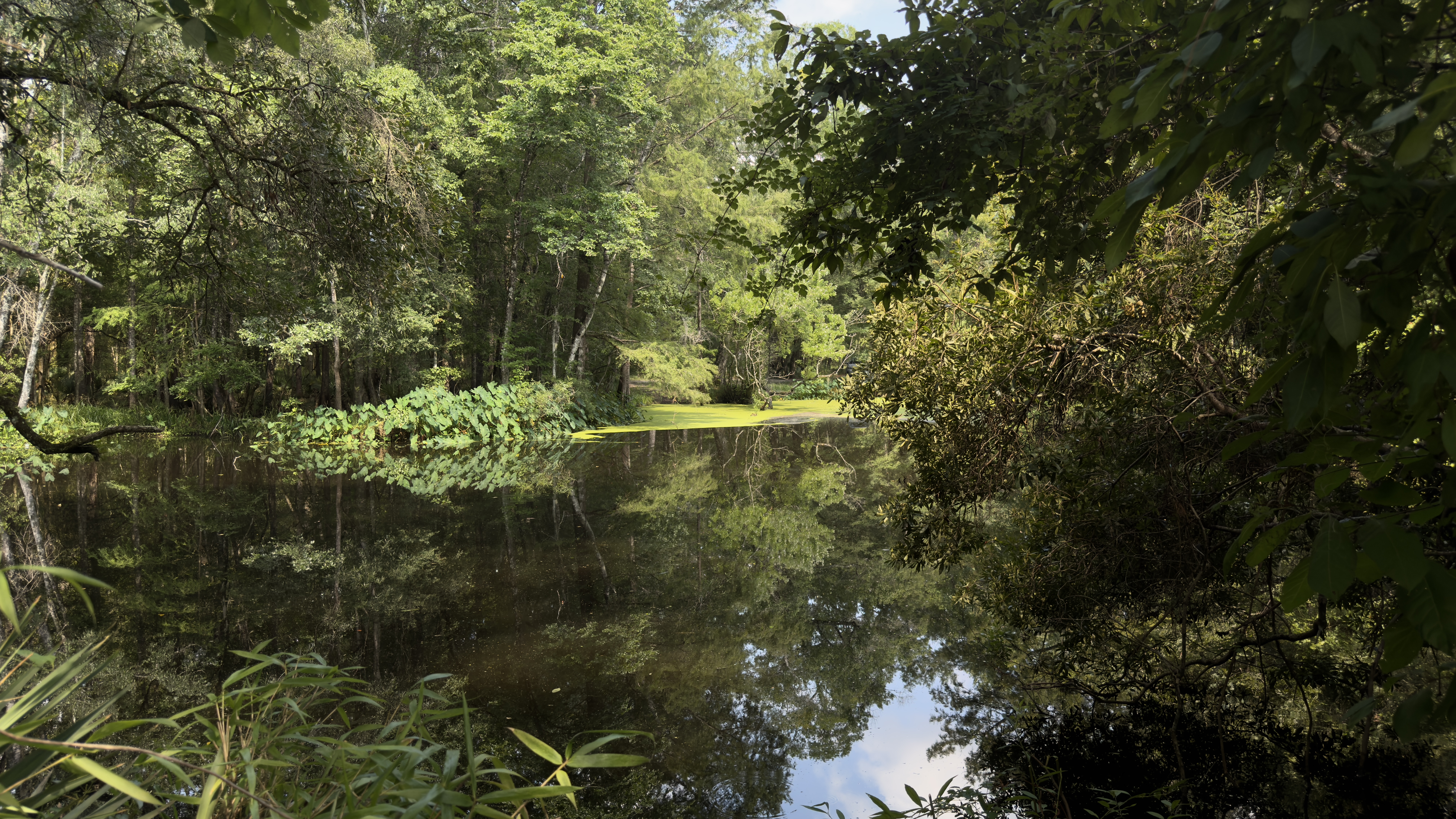
St. Marks River just before the natural bridge

Hydrology is the defining feature of the park. The St. Marks River enters the property from the northeast as a blackwater stream and, immediately downstream of Horn Spring, flows about 2.5 mi (4.0 km) to the natural bridge, where it plunges into a sinkhole and travels roughly 0.6 mi (0.97 km) through an active cave system before re-emerging at the St. Marks River Rise just south of the park boundary. Below the rise the river continues about 11 mi (18 km) south to its confluence with the Wakulla River and, shortly thereafter, the Gulf of Mexico; average flow measured within the park is about 700 cu ft/s (20 m^{3}/s).

Along the underground reach the surface displays a chain of sinkholes and karst windows: shallow, seasonally dry depressions on the original park parcel, and deeper flooded chambers on the Rakestraw Tract where currents and ripples on the water surface reveal the flow of the subterranean river. A nineteenth-century canal system, likely excavated in the 1830s for the passage of timber, links several of the Rakestraw sinks across the surface of the natural bridge; the spoil piles thrown up by the canal excavation formed defensive cover during the 1865 battle. Acquisition of the Gerrell Tract in 2011 added the magnitude-two Gerrell Spring, formerly known locally as Elly Spring, and about 0.5 mi (0.80 km) of spring run that flows south to join the main river below the rise. All waters within the park are designated Outstanding Florida Waters under Chapter 62-302 of the Florida Administrative Code and are classified as Class III surface waters.

== Climate ==
The park has a humid subtropical climate (Köppen Cfa), typical of the Florida Big Bend. Summers are long, hot, and humid, with frequent afternoon thunderstorms, and winters are mild and generally dry but subject to occasional freezes; annual rainfall recorded at the on-site park gauge averages about 57 in (1,400 mm). The nearest first-order weather station is at Tallahassee International Airport (USW00093805), about 20 mi (32 km) west-southwest of the park.

Climate data for Tallahassee International Airport, the nearest weather station (1991–2020 normals, extremes 1892–present)
Month	Jan	Feb	Mar	Apr	May	Jun	Jul	Aug	Sep	Oct	Nov	Dec	Year
Record high °F (°C)	84 (29)	89 (32)	91 (33)	95 (35)	102 (39)	105 (41)	104 (40)	103 (39)	102 (39)	97 (36)	89 (32)	84 (29)	105 (41)
Mean daily maximum °F (°C)	63.9 (17.7)	67.8 (19.9)	74.2 (23.4)	80.2 (26.8)	87.4 (30.8)	90.8 (32.7)	92.1 (33.4)	91.5 (33.1)	88.6 (31.4)	81.7 (27.6)	72.5 (22.5)	65.9 (18.8)	79.7 (26.5)
Daily mean °F (°C)	52.2 (11.2)	55.6 (13.1)	61.4 (16.3)	67.3 (19.6)	75.2 (24.0)	80.8 (27.1)	82.5 (28.1)	82.4 (28.0)	79.1 (26.2)	70.3 (21.3)	60.2 (15.7)	54.4 (12.4)	68.5 (20.3)
Mean daily minimum °F (°C)	40.5 (4.7)	43.5 (6.4)	48.6 (9.2)	54.4 (12.4)	63.0 (17.2)	70.8 (21.6)	73.0 (22.8)	73.2 (22.9)	69.6 (20.9)	58.8 (14.9)	48.0 (8.9)	42.9 (6.1)	57.2 (14.0)
Record low °F (°C)	6 (−14)	−2 (−19)	20 (−7)	29 (−2)	34 (1)	46 (8)	57 (14)	57 (14)	40 (4)	29 (−2)	13 (−11)	10 (−12)	−2 (−19)
Average precipitation inches (mm)	4.41 (112)	4.28 (109)	5.24 (133)	3.53 (90)	3.36 (85)	7.76 (197)	7.14 (181)	7.60 (193)	4.91 (125)	3.24 (82)	3.10 (79)	4.24 (108)	58.81 (1,494)
Average precipitation days (≥ 0.01 in)	8.9	8.1	8.0	6.7	7.5	14.3	16.4	14.8	9.0	5.9	6.3	8.3	114.2
Source: NOAA

== Ecology ==
The Florida Natural Areas Inventory recognizes eight distinct natural communities within the park boundary, together with several altered land-cover types associated with the original battlefield core and the Rakestraw and Gerrell tracts.

=== Flora ===
Bottomland forest, in very good condition, covers about 46.68 acres (18.89 ha) and forms the park's largest natural community. It supports a diverse hardwood canopy including swamp chestnut oak (Quercus michauxii), white oak (Q. alba), American beech (Fagus grandifolia), blue beech (Carpinus caroliniana), sweetgum (Liquidambar styraciflua), spruce pine (Pinus glabra), southern magnolia (Magnolia grandiflora), pignut hickory (Carya glabra), American holly (Ilex opaca), loblolly bay (Gordonia lasianthus), and sweetbay (Magnolia virginiana). Alluvial forest, occurring on both banks of the Gerrell Tract tributary and in smaller patches near the river, occupies about 32.64 acres (13.21 ha) and is dominated by bald cypress (Taxodium distichum), black gum (Nyssa sylvatica), red maple (Acer rubrum), swamp bay (Persea palustris), and black willow (Salix nigra); crawfish chimneys and cypress knees are conspicuous ground features. A floodplain swamp at the southwest corner of the park is dominated by mature bald cypress with sweetgum and black gum, and the sinkhole-lake and sinkhole communities carry a distinct assemblage that in places includes pink azalea (Rhododendron canescens), a species listed as commercially exploited by the Florida Department of Agriculture and Consumer Services.

The upland communities on the Gerrell Tract are dominated by about 13.24 acres (5.36 ha) of mesic flatwoods in fair to good condition, with a sparse canopy of slash pine (Pinus elliottii) and longleaf pine (P. palustris) over saw palmetto (Serenoa repens), wiregrass (Aristida stricta), and characteristic ericaceous shrubs. An adjacent 10.66 acres (4.31 ha) pine plantation, whose indicator species and deep sandy soils suggest an original sandhill affinity, is targeted for restoration to sandhill through prescribed burning and longleaf pine replanting.

=== Fauna ===
Imperiled fauna documented within the park include the American alligator (Alligator mississippiensis), gopher tortoise (Gopherus polyphemus), alligator snapping turtle (Macrochelys temminckii), Suwannee cooter (Pseudemys concinna suwanniensis), little blue heron (Egretta caerulea), wood stork (Mycteria americana), and Florida black bear (Ursus americanus floridanus). A bald eagle (Haliaeetus leucocephalus) nest has been recorded in the canopy of the Gerrell tributary, and gopher tortoise burrows are present on the Gerrell Tract and on neighboring lands, with occasional foragers observed inside the park. The St. Marks River and its associated karst waters, all designated Outstanding Florida Waters, provide important habitat for the aquatic and semi-aquatic species listed above, as well as for wading birds along the vegetated shorelines.

== Recreational activities ==
The park is classified in the Florida State Park system as a "special feature site", a designation reserved for discrete resources of statewide or regional significance where recreation is limited to passive, interpretive activities that support protection of the feature. Facilities on the original park parcel include a stabilized parking area for up to twenty-five vehicles, three small picnic shelters with grills, restrooms, the 1922 monument, reconstructed picket lines, interpretive panels, and a shoreline canoe and kayak launch on a 3.31 acres (1.34 ha) parcel operated under agreement with Natural Bridge Timberlands, LLC. Visitors also fish from the banks of the St. Marks River above the natural bridge; access to the Rakestraw and Gerrell tracts is by scheduled guided tour, both for interpretive reasons and to protect the steep-walled sinkhole lakes and archaeological resources from unsupervised use.

The most public event is the annual reenactment of the Battle of Natural Bridge, staged on the first weekend of March each year and open to the public without charge. In addition to the battle reenactment itself, the weekend includes period military and civilian encampments, artillery and small-arms demonstrations, and a memorial service by the Anna Jackson Chapter of the United Daughters of the Confederacy. By DEP estimates, the park's 6,251 visitors during fiscal year 2014–15 contributed about $583,000 in direct economic impact to the local economy.

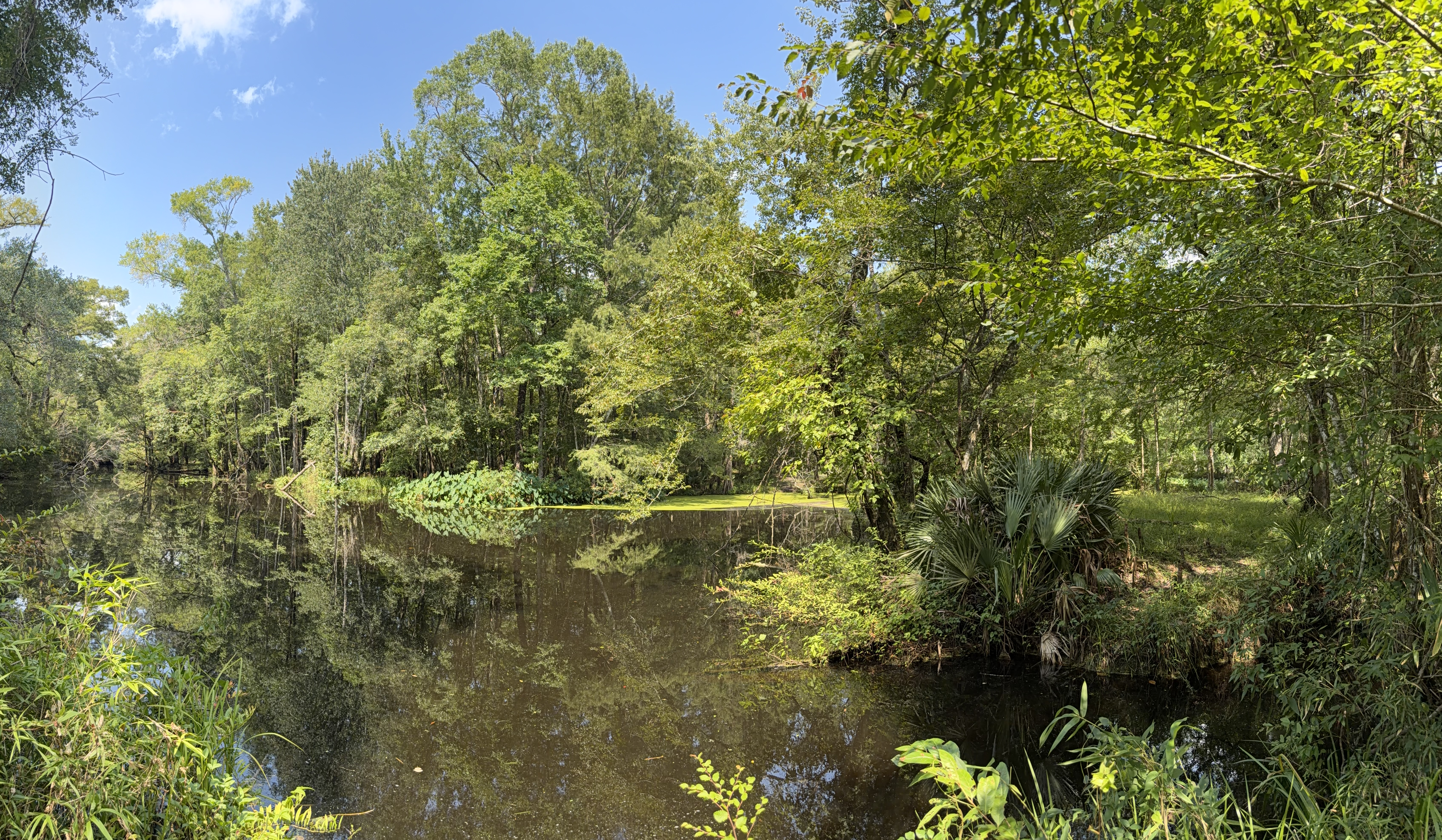
Panorama shot of St. Marks River Rise
