= CSS Florida (blockade runner) =

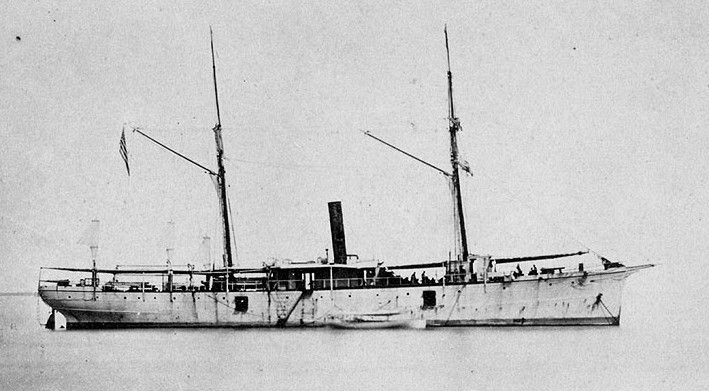
- CSS Florida after she was captured by the United States and renamed USS Hendrick Hudson

History

Confederate States
- Name: Florida
- Launched: 1859
- Commissioned: January 15, 1862
- Decommissioned: April 6, 1862
- Fate: Captured by U.S. Navy, renamed USS Hendrick Hudson

General characteristics
- Displacement: 460 tons
- Length: 171 ft (52 m)
- Beam: 29 ft 11 in (9.12 m)
- Propulsion: Steam engine and sails

The Confederate blockade runner CSS Florida, was built at Greenpoint, New York in 1859. Considered for service as a gunboat three times during the American Civil War, the vessel was captured by the Union Navy on April 6, 1862. The ship was taken into service by the Union and renamed USS Hendrick Hudson.

== Construction and career ==
Florida was thrice considered for a gunboat before she became one. Contrary to previous interpretation of the official records, closer comparison of entries reveals that she did not serve the Mississippi River Defense Fleet as originally intended but became a Government-owned blockade runner; most authors have confused her with the Mobilian CSS Florida who did not receive her name CSS Selma until July 1862. CSS Florida of New Orleans was one of 14 steamers of Charles Morgan's Southern Steamship Co. which Major General Mansfield Lovell "impressed for public service" at New Orleans, January 15, 1862, acting on Confederate Secretary of War Judah P. Benjamin's orders.

Lieutenant Beverly Kennon, CSN, had sought Florida's command but had to be content with CSS Governor Moore. He nostalgically described Florida to a court of inquiry as "a very fast and a very handsome vessel indeed... A direct-acting screw of about 100 horsepower [75 kW] …about the same size in all respects as the U.S. steam sloop Pocahontas."

Of the several ships of the same name, she apparently is the Florida which arrived at Havana, Cuba on March 23, 1862, with 1,000 bales of cotton. Attempting to repeat her success, she had loaded 211 bales in St. Joseph Bay near Pensacola, Florida when captured by Acting Master Elnathan Lewis, USN, with armed boats from the bark USS Pursuit on April 6. The boarders had just captured a sloop, Lafayette, at St. Andrew's, Florida, 20 miles below, and the latter's Captain Harrison volunteered to pilot Lewis' party on up to capture Florida. Surprised at 4 o'clock Sunday morning, Florida's crew were unable to fire their ship.

It later appeared that the pilot, chief mate, first and second engineers were Union sympathizers. Mr. Lewis, after running Florida aground twice and jettisoning 30 bales of cargo, found "it was impossible to bring her out without the assistance of the engineers, pilot, and mate; so rather than burn her he considered it prudent to bargain with them, and gave his word that they would receive $500.00 each. They were faithful."

In the 30 mile (50 km) passage to the bar, Florida and Lafayette were almost recaptured by the Confederates on April 8 after Captain R. L. Smith, CSA, and his company of dragoons had galloped 24 hours from Marianna, Florida to intercept them off St. Andrew's. A ship's boat was ambushed with four casualties, one dead, but the prizes continued on to Key West. There, on April 19, 1862, Commodore William McKean reporting to United States Secretary of the Navy Gideon Welles confirmed that Florida had never been converted: "I have examined her, and find that her upper deck is too light to carry guns of any weight. I have not the means to strengthen her sufficiently, or I should retain and convert her into a gunboat." Despite this rejection, the U.S. Navy bought Florida from the Philadelphia prize court on September 20, 1862, changed her name to USS Hendrick Hudson and placed 4, later 5, guns on board.

=== Union service ===
Hendrick Hudson served in the East Gulf Blockading Squadron for the remainder of the war, capturing two schooners and sinking the blockade runner Wild Pigeon. Two members of her crew received the Medal of Honor for their actions at the Battle of Natural Bridge. She was sold into commercial service in 1865, and sunk near Havana, Cuba in 1867.

== See also ==
- Captured ships of the American Civil War

== Bibliography ==
- Wilkinson, John (1877). The Narrative of a Blockade-Runner.
  Sheldon & Company, New York. p. 252. Url1 Url2
- Ellis, John E. "CONFEDERATE STATES NAVY, MUSEUM, LIBRARY & RESEARCH INSTITUTE". Confederate States Navy Research Library, Mobile, Alabama.
