= Charles Read (Medal of Honor) =

Union Navy sailor in the American Civil War

- Born: 1840; Cambridge, New York
- Died: Unknown
- Military career
- Allegiance: United States
- Branch: United States Navy
- Rank: Ordinary Seaman
- Unit: (United States Navy) USS Magnolia
- Conflicts: American Civil War • Battle of Natural Bridge
- Awards: Medal of Honor

Charles Read (born 1840, date of death unknown) was a Union Navy sailor in the American Civil War and a recipient of the U.S. military's highest decoration, the Medal of Honor, for his actions at the Battle of Natural Bridge.

Born in 1840 in Cambridge, New York, Read joined the Navy from that state. By March 5, 1865, he was serving as an ordinary seaman on the USS Magnolia. On that day and the next, he accompanied a Union Army force during the Battle of Natural Bridge near St. Marks, Florida. He helped transport and fire a naval howitzer throughout the engagement despite heavy Confederate fire. For this action, he was awarded the Medal of Honor three months later, on June 22, 1865. He was one of six sailors to receive the medal for manning artillery pieces during the battle, the others being Landsman John S. Lann, Seaman John Mack, Seaman George Pyne, Coxswain George Schutt, and Seaman Thomas Smith.

Read's official Medal of Honor citation is as follows:

As seaman on board the U.S.S. Magnolia, St. Marks, Fla., 5 and 6 March 1865. Serving with the Army in charge of Navy howitzers during the attack on St. Marks and throughout this fierce engagement, Read made remarkable efforts in assisting transport of the gun, and his coolness and determination in courageously standing by his gun while under the fire of the enemy were a credit to the service to which he belonged.
