= Thomas Smith (Medal of Honor, 1865) =

- Born: 1838; England
- Died: 22 October 1905 (aged 66–67)
- Burial place: Mountain Home National Cemetery in Johnson City, Tennessee
- Military career
- Allegiance: United States
- Branch: United States Navy
- Rank: Seaman
- Unit: USS Magnolia
- Conflicts: American Civil War • Battle of Natural Bridge
- Awards: Medal of Honor

Thomas Smith (1838 – 22 October 1905) was a Union Navy sailor in the American Civil War and a recipient of the U.S. military's highest decoration, the Medal of Honor, for his actions at the Battle of Natural Bridge.

Born in 1838 in England, Smith joined the U.S. Navy from the state of New York. By March 5, 1865, he was serving as a seaman on the USS Magnolia. On that day and the next, he accompanied a Union Army force during the Battle of Natural Bridge near St. Marks, Florida. He helped transport and fire a naval howitzer throughout the engagement despite heavy Confederate fire. For this action, he was awarded the Medal of Honor three months later, on June 22, 1865. He was one of six sailors to receive the medal for manning artillery pieces during the battle, the others being Landsman John S. Lann, Seaman John Mack, Seaman George Pyne, Ordinary Seaman Charles Read, and Coxswain George Schutt. He was buried at the Mountain Home National Cemetery in Johnson City, Tennessee.

Smith's Medal of Honor citation reads:

As seaman on board the U.S.S. Magnolia, St. Marks, Fla., 5 and 6 March 1865. Serving with the Army in charge of Navy howitzers during the attack on St. Marks and throughout this fierce engagement, Smith made remarkable efforts in assisting transport of the gun, and his coolness and determination in courageously standing by his gun while under the fire of the enemy were a credit to the service to which he belonged.
