= John Lanning =

John Lanning may refer to:

- John S. Lanning, Union Navy sailor and Medal of Honor recipient
- John Tate Lanning, historian of Spanish America
- Johnny Lanning, American baseball pitcher
