= USS Magnolia =

Gunboat of the United States Navy

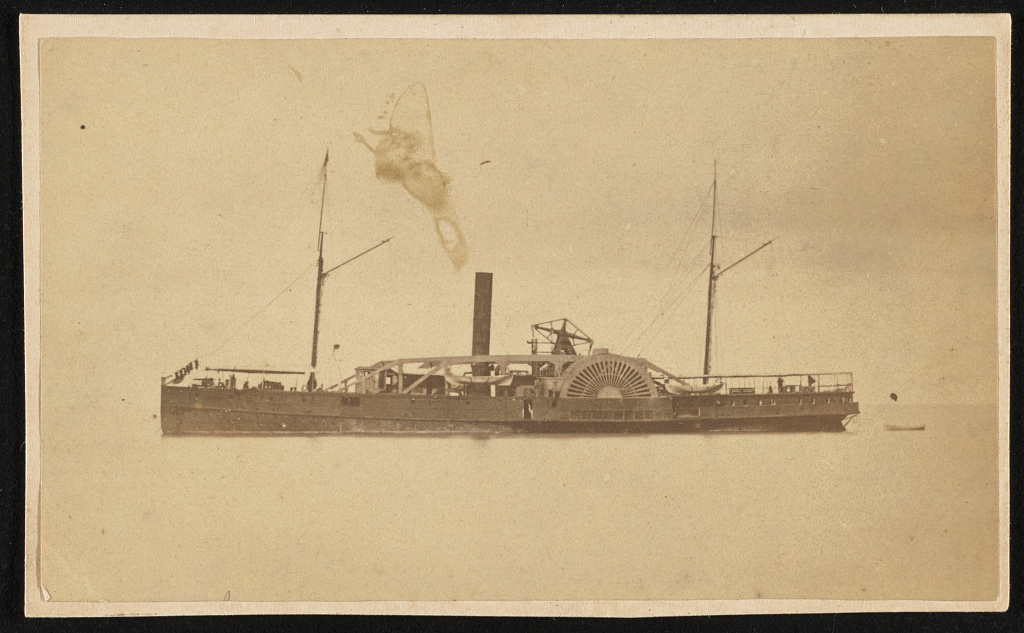
- USS Magnolia, circa 1864

History

United States
- Launched: 22 Aug 1854
- Acquired: 9 April 1862
- Commissioned: 22 July 1862
- Decommissioned: 10 June 1865
- Captured: by Union Navy forces; 19 February 1862
- Fate: sold, 12 July 1865

General characteristics
- Displacement: 843 tons
- Length: 242 ft (74 m)
- Beam: 34.5 ft (10.5 m)
- Height: 10.5 ft (3.2 m)
- Draft: 8 ft (2.4 m)
- Propulsion: 2 × Vertical beam steam engine, 2 × sidewheels; auxiliary sails
- Sail plan: Schooner-rigged
- Speed: 12 knots (22 km/h; 14 mph)
- Complement: 95
- Armament: one 20-pounder Parrott rifle; four 24-pounder guns

USS Magnolia was a paddle steamer captured by the Union Navy during the American Civil War. She served with the Union Navy from 1862-1865 primarily to enforce the naval blockade of the Confederacy off of its Atlantic and Gulf coasts.

== Service history ==
Magnolia, a wooden, seagoing, sidewheel steamer built by J. Simonson of Greenpoint, New York for Charles Morgan's Southern Steamship Company. Launched in 1854, the ship was impressed as a public vessel in New Orleans, Louisiana, 15 January 1862, by Maj. Gen. Mansfield Lovell, CSA, acting for the Confederacy's Secretary of War Judah P. Benjamin. The South's original plan to arm her as a ram was dropped in favor of turning her into a blockade runner. In 1858 Floridian cattle man Captain James McKay Sr. of Tampa made a contract with the Morgan Line. This contract allowed McKay to use Magnolia twice a month at a price of $1,500 each run in order to ship cattle to Cuba, making Magnolia the first of many ships to be used in the same way. For this reason, the introduction of Spanish doubloons to Florida can be traced back to the trading trips made by Magnolia. Magnolia made at least two successful runs to nearby British islands in 1861 carrying large cargoes.

On 19 February 1862, while trying to escape in a dense fog through Pass a' l’Outre to the Gulf of Mexico with a large cargo of cotton and rosin, Magnolia was detected and chased by Union ships Brooklyn and Mercedita. After a daylong pursuit, Magnolia was intercepted by South Carolina near the entrance to Mobile Bay. Under cannon fire from both Brooklyn and South Carolina, Magnolia's Confederate crew and passengers abandoned their run, attempted to destroy the ship by setting fire to cotton cargo, opening seacocks, and exploding a boiler, then departed in small boats. A boarding party from South Carolina under command of Lt. James Parker took possession of Magnolia, extinguished the fires, and stopped the flooding. Magnolia's passengers and crew were taken prisoner. Her destination was discovered to have been Havana, Cuba, a Spanish colony at the time. Letters found aboard Magnolia documented arms purchases by the Confederacy from Spain, and implicated the Spanish consul in New Orleans as an intermediary profiting from the deals.

After capture, Magnolia was towed to the Union naval station at Ship Island for further repairs, then to Key West, Florida, where she was evaluated and condemned. She was purchased 9 April 1862 at New York City, by the Navy Department from the Key West Prize Court. After repairs, she commissioned at New York City 22 July 1862, Lt. William Budd in command.

The sidewheel steamer departed New York 26 July 1862 to take station near Key West as part of the Union blockade. En route on the 31st, she captured British steamer Memphis near Cape Romain, South Carolina, bound ostensibly from Nassau, Bahamas, to Liverpool, England. Search produced papers revealing that she had actually departed Charleston, South Carolina, the previous night with a cargo of cotton and rosin. Aided by South Carolina, Magnolia convoyed her prize to New York City, arriving 3 August. After repairs, she sailed again for Key West. Operating off the coast of Florida with the Eastern Gulf Blockading Squadron, Magnolia took British schooner Carmita 27 December, and 2 days later seized a second blockade runner, British sloop Flying Fish, off Tortugas. By mid January 1863, repeated boiler problems slowed down Magnolia’s activities on blockade, and 15 July she sailed for New York for extensive repairs.

Magnolia sailed to rejoin the Eastern Gulf Blockading Squadron 25 April 1864, and patrolled off the Bahama Banks. On 10 September, she captured steamer Matagorda with a load of cotton, carrying no papers and flying no colors. She remained on blockade in these waters until February 1865, when she shifted to Apalachee Bay to blockade St. Marks, Florida. Four of the ship's sailors were awarded the Medal of Honor for accompanying a Union Army force during the Battle of Natural Bridge on 5–6 March 1865. The four men were Landsman John S. Lann, Seaman George Pyne, Ordinary Seaman Charles Read, and Seaman Thomas Smith. Magnolia put into Key West 15 March, and spent her last war days ferrying supplies to the ships maintaining the blockade. Magnolia decommissioned at New York 10 June 1865 and was sold at public auction to N. L. & G. Griswold 12 July 1865. Redocumented 23 August 1865, Magnolia served briefly as a merchantman and was abandoned in 1866.

== Monuments / Artifacts ==
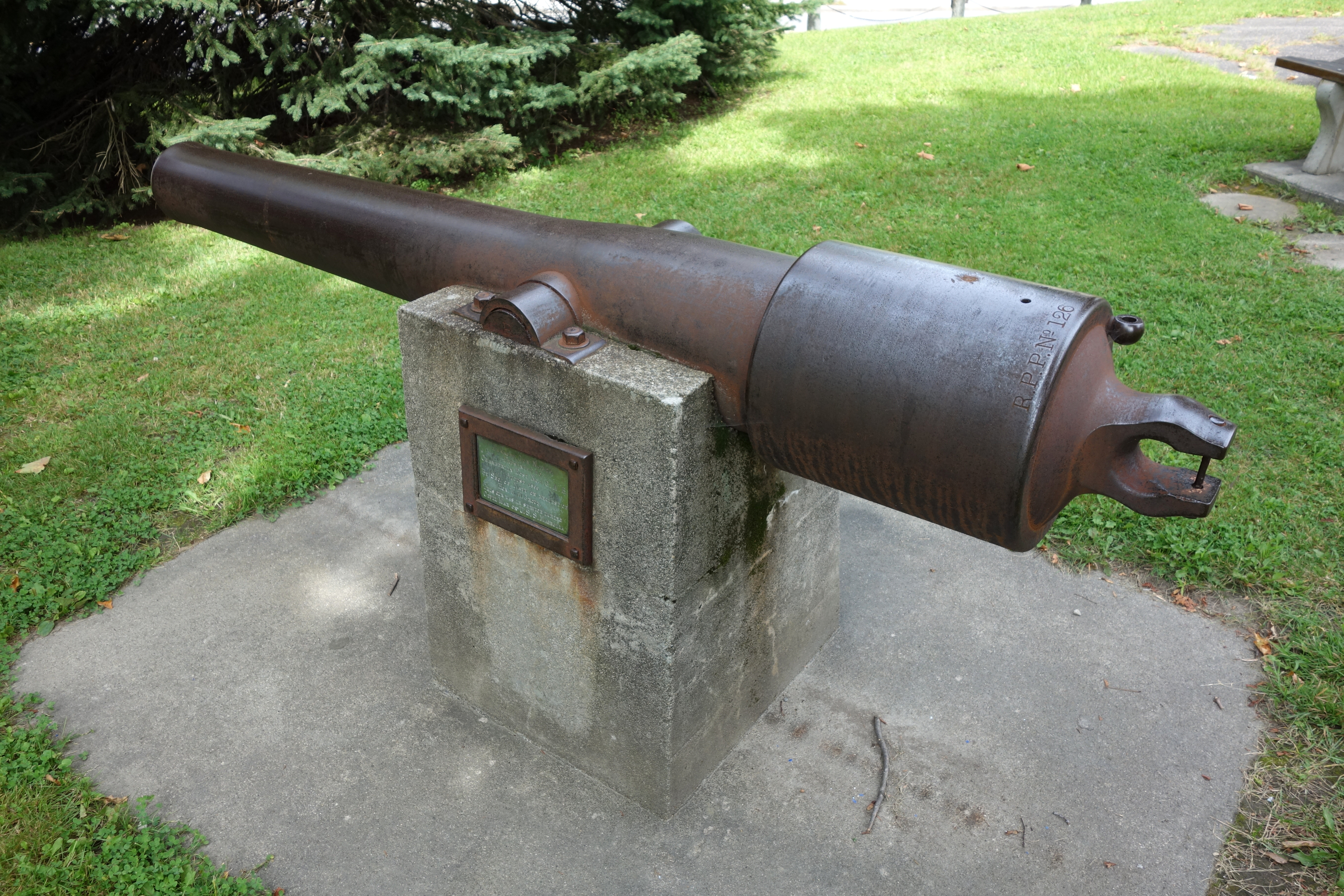
Parrott gun No. 126, from USS Magnolia - St. Johnsbury, Vermont - DSC04161

A Parrot gun (No. 126) from Magnolia's wartime service was presented by the Secretary of the Navy in 1899 to Chamberlin Post 1, Grand Army of the Republic in St Johnsbury, VT. As of 2025, it remains on public display at the St. Johnsbury Civil War Memorial.
