= Woodville, Florida =

- CDP
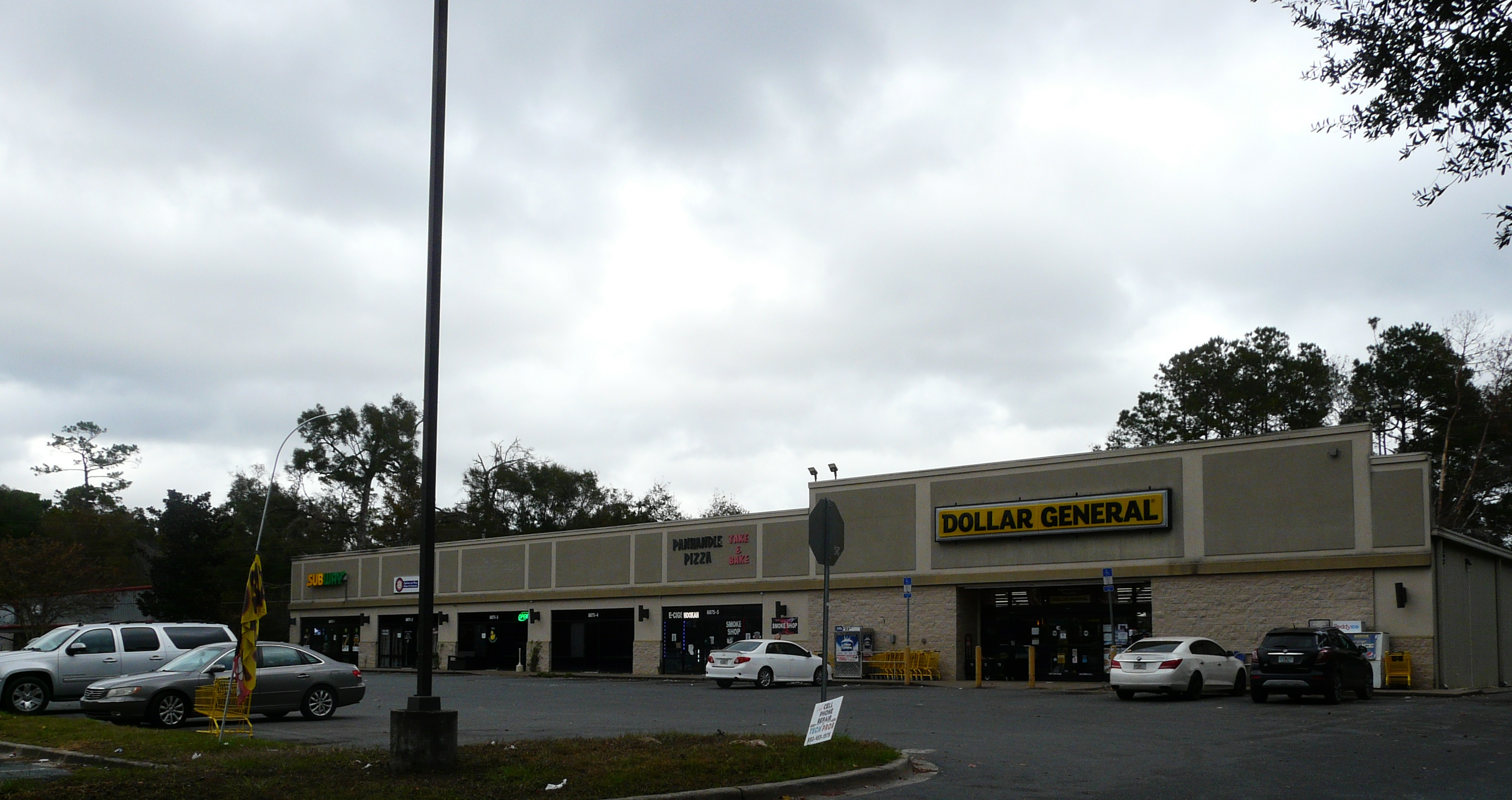
- Woodville Dollar General

- Location in Leon County and the state of Florida
- Coordinates: 30°18′27″N 84°15′18″W
- Country: United States
- State: Florida
- County: Leon

Area
  - Total: 8.46 sq mi (21.91 km^{2})
  - Land: 8.44 sq mi (21.87 km^{2})
  - Water: 0.012 sq mi (0.03 km^{2})
- Elevation: 30 ft (9.1 m)

Population (2020)
  - Total: 4,097
  - Density: 485/sq mi (187.3/km^{2})
- Time zone: UTC-5 (Eastern (EST))
  - Summer (DST): UTC-4 (EDT)
- ZIP code: 32305
- Area code: 850
- FIPS code: 12-78700
- GNIS feature ID: 2403043

Woodville is a census-designated place in Leon County, Florida, United States, just south of Tallahassee, Florida. The population was 4,097 at the 2020 census, up from 2,978 at the 2010 census. It is part of the Tallahassee, Florida Metropolitan Statistical Area. The American Civil War Battle of Natural Bridge, in March 1865, occurred near what is now Woodville, at the Natural Bridge (approximately six miles from Woodville proper). This is where the St. Marks River drops into a sinkhole, the Natural Bridge Sink and flows underground, reemerging .25 miles (0.40 km) downstream.

== Geography ==
According to the United States Census Bureau, the CDP has a total area of 6.4 square miles (17 km^{2}), all land.

== Demographics ==
Historical population
Census	Pop.	Note	%±
1990	2,760		—
2000	3,006		8.9%
2010	2,978		−0.9%
2020	4,097		37.6%
U.S. Decennial Census

=== 2020 census ===
As of the 2020 census, Woodville had a population of 4,097. The median age was 44.2 years. 21.0% of residents were under the age of 18 and 18.9% were 65 years of age or older. For every 100 females, there were 98.3 males, and for every 100 females age 18 and over, there were 95.8 males age 18 and over.

0.0% of residents lived in urban areas, while 100.0% lived in rural areas.

There were 1,671 households in Woodville, of which 28.8% had children under the age of 18 living in them. Of all households, 43.5% were married-couple households, 19.9% were households with a male householder and no spouse or partner present, and 28.1% were households with a female householder and no spouse or partner present. About 24.7% of all households were made up of individuals, and 10.1% had someone living alone who was 65 years of age or older.

There were 1,841 housing units, of which 9.2% were vacant. The homeowner vacancy rate was 0.2% and the rental vacancy rate was 6.2%.

Woodville racial composition (NH = Non-Hispanic) (Note: Note: the US Census treats Hispanic/Latino as an ethnic category. This table excludes Latinos from the racial categories and assigns them to a separate category. Hispanics/Latinos can be of any race.)
Race	Number	Percentage
White (NH)	2,513	61.34%
Black or African American (NH)	1,098	26.8%
Native American or Alaska Native (NH)	19	0.46%
Asian (NH)	9	0.22%
Pacific Islander (NH)	7	0.17%
Some Other Race (NH)	20	0.49%
Mixed/Multi-Racial (NH)	236	5.76%
Hispanic or Latino	195	4.76%
Total	4,097	

=== 2000 census ===
As of the census of 2000, there were 3,006 people, 1,182 households, and 855 families residing in the CDP. The population density was 427.8 inhabitants per square mile (165.2/km^{2}). There were 1,278 housing units at an average density of 198.9 per square mile (76.8/km^{2}). The racial makeup of the CDP was 79.34% White, 18.30% African American, 0.70% Native American, 0.13% Asian, 0.27% from other races, and 1.26% from two or more races. Hispanic or Latino of any race were 2.00% of the population.

There were 1,182 households, out of which 32.0% had children under the age of 18 living with them, 50.7% were married couples living together, 15.4% had a female householder with no husband present, and 27.6% were non-families. 21.7% of all households were made up of individuals, and 7.0% had someone living alone who was 65 years of age or older. The average household size was 2.54 and the average family size was 2.92.

In the CDP, the population was spread out, with 25.1% under the age of 18, 8.8% from 18 to 24, 29.2% from 25 to 44, 26.3% from 45 to 64, and 10.6% who were 65 years of age or older. The median age was 37 years. For every 100 females, there were 95.6 males. For every 100 females age 18 and over, there were 92.0 males.

The median income for a household in the CDP was $38,946, and the median income for a family was $42,026. Males had a median income of $26,495 versus $27,237 for females. The per capita income for the CDP was $19,915. About 6.2% of families and 10.7% of the population were below the poverty line, including 19.0% of those under age 18 and 2.8% of those age 65 or over.

== Climate ==
The climate in this area is characterized by hot, humid summers and generally mild to cool winters. According to the Köppen Climate Classification system, Woodville has a humid subtropical climate, abbreviated "Cfa" on climate maps.

== Fire suppression ==
The Woodville Volunteer Fire Department (WVFD) is a non-profit organization established on January 5, 1989. Bylaws and articles of incorporation were filed in May of that year. WVFD shares Tallahassee Fire Department Station 13 through a mutual-aid agreement with the City of Tallahassee. The station is located at 1555 Oak Ridge Road East.
