= 1st Florida Infantry Regiment =

1st Florida Infantry Regiment 1st (McDonell's) Battalion, Florida Infantry 1st and 3rd Consolidated Florida Infantry Regiment
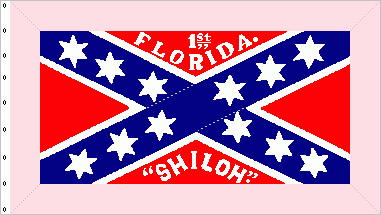
- Flag of the 1st Florida Infantry
- Active: 1st Florida Infantry Regiment (May 5, 1861 – May 1862); 1st (McDonell's) Florida Infantry Battalion (May 1862 – August 1862); 1st Florida Infantry Regiment (August 1862 – December 1862); 1st and 3rd Consolidated Florida Infantry Regiment (December 1862 – April 9, 1865); 1st Florida Infantry Regiment (April 9, 1865 – April 26, 1865)
- Country: Confederate States of America
- Allegiance: Confederate Florida; Confederate States of America
- Branch: Confederate States Army
- Type: Regiment / Battalion
- Role: Infantry
- Part of: Army of Tennessee; Army of Mississippi; Army of Pensacola
- Equipment: .69 Springfield Model 1842
- Engagements: American Civil War: Battle of Santa Rosa Island; Battle of Shiloh; Siege of Corinth; Confederate Heartland Offensive; Battle of Perryville; Battle of Stones River; Jackson Expedition; Battle of Chickamauga; Battle of Missionary Ridge; Atlanta campaign; Battle of Resaca; Battle of Marietta; Franklin-Nashville Campaign; Third Battle of Murfreesboro; Carolina Campaign; Battle of Bentonville; Surrender at Bennett Place

Commanders
- Notable commanders: Col. James Patton Anderson; Maj. Thaddeus A. McDonell; Col. William Miller; Col. William S. Dilworth; Lt. Col. Elisha Mashburn

The 1st Florida Infantry Regiment was an infantry regiment raised by the Confederate state of Florida during the American Civil War. Raised for 12 months of service its remaining veterans served in the 1st (McDonell's) Battalion, Florida Infantry from April 1862 on. In August the depleted battalion was consolidated with the 3rd (Miller's) Battalion into the reorganized 1st Florida Infantry Regiment again. In December 1862 it merged with the 3rd Florida Infantry Regiment and received the form it kept till the war's end as the 1st and 3rd Consolidated Florida Infantry Regiment. Fighting as part of the Army of Tennessee in the Western Theater of the American Civil War it was surrendered on April 26, 1865.

== Organization ==
When the civil war erupted in 1861 Florida hastened to raise a regiment of infantry. On January 6, state militia occupied the Apalachicola Arsenal at Chattahoochee and the following day the Fort Marion in St. Augustine. on May 5, 1861, men from the counties of Leon, Alachua, Madison, Jefferson, Jackson, Franklin, Gadsden, and Escambia were mustered into state service as the 1st Florida Infantry Regiment. Like all regiments mustered in the early days of 1861, it enlisted for twelve months. Because of the haste the regiment totaled about 700 men in 9 companies with an insufficient number of uniforms and weapons. The elected staff officers were James Patton Anderson, of Jefferson County, colonel; William K. Beard, of Leon County, as lieutenant colonel, and Thaddeus A. McDonell, of Alachua County as major. Upon the completion of the organization the regiment was ordered to Pensacola where it arrived April 12, 1861. There it was mustered into Confederate service on April 19.

== Service history ==
=== 1861 and 1862 ===
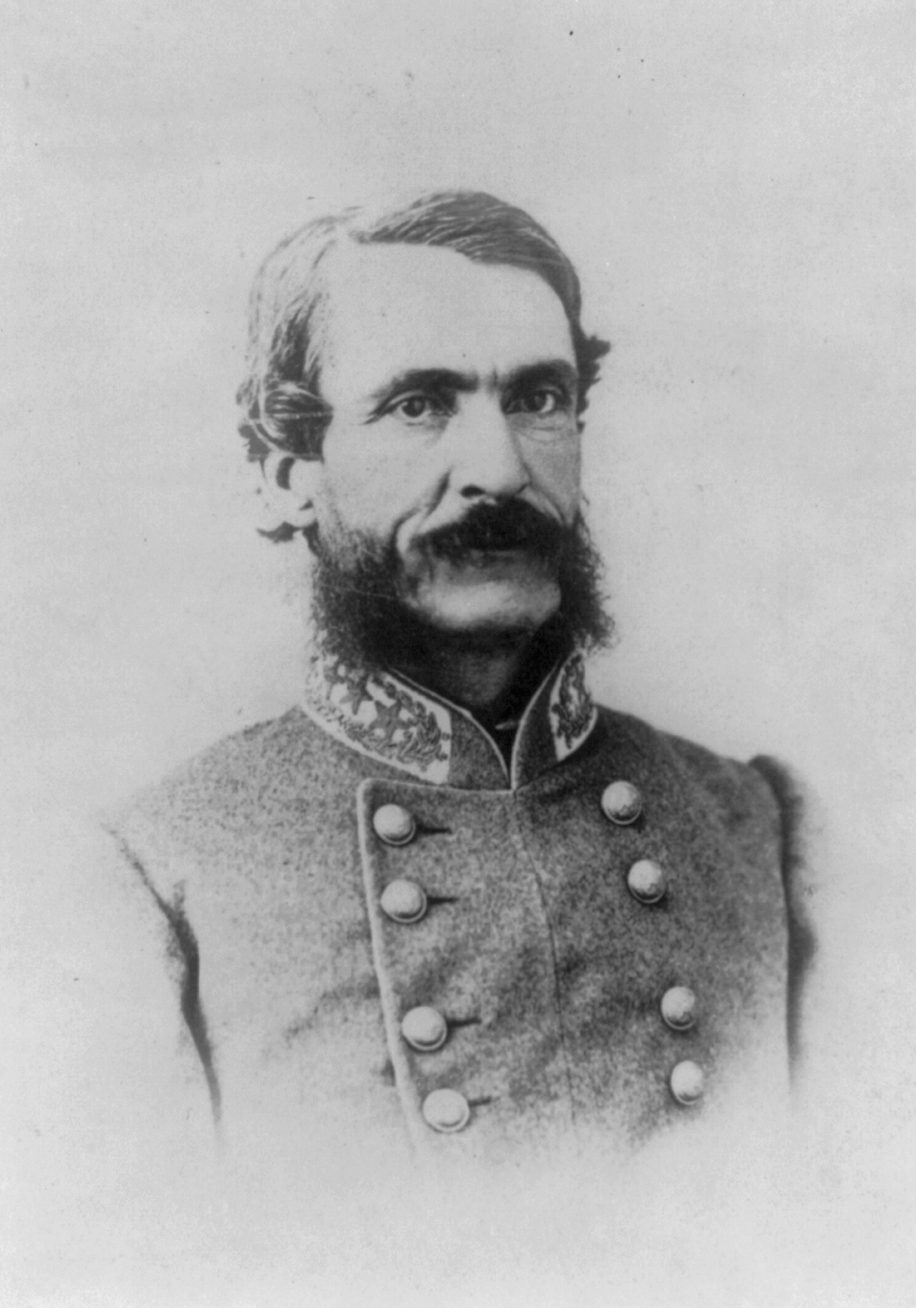
James Patton Anderson, first commander of the 1st Florida

In June the regiment received its tenth company, the local Pensacola Guards. Now the regiment was part of the Army of Pensacola under command of Brigadier General Sam Jones. On October 9, 1861, a detachment of 180 men from all companies of the regiment participated in the unsuccessful attempt to capture Fort Pickens. Under command of Colonel Anderson, leading a column with his Floridians and men from Louisiana and Alabama, the regiment lost 7 dead, 8 wounded and 12 men captured. Captain Richard Bradford of the Madison Minute Men was one of those killed in action and is reported to be the first casualty for the 1st Florida, or possibly the first casualty from the state.

The regiment joined General Braxton Bragg on his westbound journey in March 1862, and went to Corinth. When the service time of the regiment came to its end it failed to reorganize in early 1862 when only 300 of the remaining 600 men, enough for four companies, reenlisted. Those were organized into four companies under the command of Major McDonnell, as Lt. Col. Beard was appointed Inspector General of Bragg's II Corps. The 1st (McDonell's) Florida Infantry Battalion, as it was now known, and its 328 men were just in time for the Battle of Shiloh.

Patton Anderson, the regiments former Colonel, was commanding the brigade since October 1861 and was promoted to brigadier on February 10, 1862. The brigade was part of Ruggles' division. On April 6, 1862, the 250 present men participated in the morning advance as part of the second line. Advancing along the Pittsburgh-Corinth Road the regiment suffered heavy fire from Ohio troops and artillery. When Major McDonell fell, wounded by an artillery fragment to the thigh, command of the unit fell onto Captain William G. Poole.

Anderson's brigade, and the 1st Florida, belonged to the force that stormed the Hornet's Nest. The exhausted troops were periodically bombarded through the night by Union gunboats; and retreated with the rest of the army on April 7. Poole, who turned command over to Captain W.C. Beard on the 7th, was cited by Anderson for his gallant leadership throughout the two-day battle.

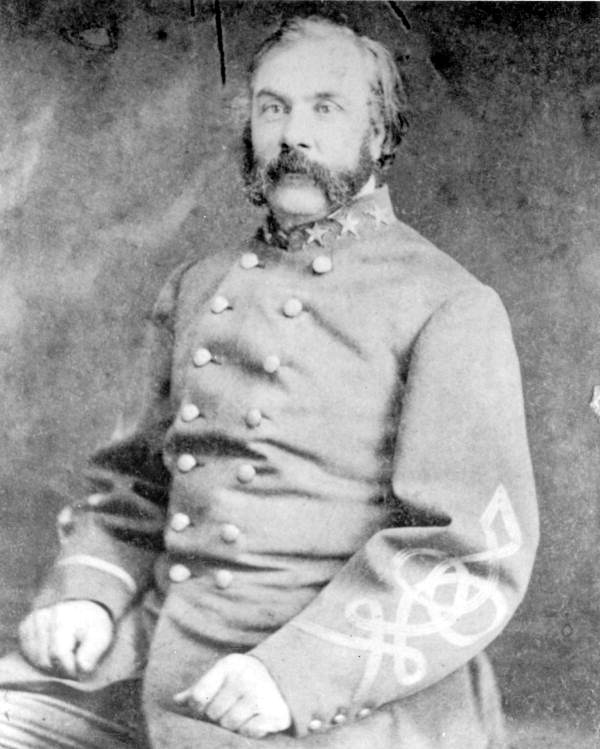
William Miller, third commander of the 1st Florida

Afterwards the battalion, which had tallied 2 officers and 14 enlisted men dead along with 57 wounded at Shiloh, was consolidated with the Confederate (Louisiana) Guards Response Battalion under overall command of Major William Clack. The consolidation proved to be only temporary as the Guards Battalion was transferred in August 1861. Going north in the Confederate Heartland Offensive the 1st Battalion fought in the Battle of Perryville, suffering 12 dead, 54 wounded and 6 missing from a total of 167 men. The depleted battalion was consolidated with the 3rd (Miller's) Florida Battalion. Miller's 6 companies and the veterans of the 1st Battalion were reorganized as 1st Florida Infantry Regiment again. William Miller was elected Colonel, McDonell became lieutenant colonel and Glover A. Ball became major. In December 1862 the regiment, now part of the brigade of Brigadier William Preston, was loosely paired with the 3rd Florida Infantry, under the overall command of Miller. The 531 men of the 1st and 3rd Regiments fought distinctively at Stones River, taking high losses including Colonel Miller, who was wounded on the last day of the battle. Overall command then went to Colonel William S. Dilworth of the 3rd Florida. Due to the casualties both regiments took before, this consolidation became permanent; Dilworth stayed in command for the rest of the war while Miller commanded reserve forces (becoming a brigadier general in 1864).

=== 1863 ===
The 1st-3rd Florida spent the winter near Tullahoma, Tennessee, with drilling new arrived recruits and holding target practice. In March 1863 The regiment saw combat around the siege of Vicksburg. Detached to participate in the Jackson Expedition, General Joseph Johnston's relief action, it fought as part of Adams' brigade in the Siege of Jackson. By summer the returned regiment was in the brigade of Marcellus A. Stovall.

On September 19, 1863, General John C. Breckinridge's division was on the left of the entire Confederate line along the Chickamauga Creek. Stationed near Glass' Mill; the 1st-3rd Florida was detached with an artillery battery as observation force when the rest of the division moved southwards. During the night to the 20th, D.H. Hill's whole corps was shifted to the extreme right of the Confederate lines. The 1st-3rd, relieved by cavalry from Wharton's division, had to march the whole night till it reached its position on the right; not locating its brigade till 8 a.m. When the advance against the Union positions around Horseshoe Ridge started in the morning the brigade was on the right of the second line, and marched against elements from Thomas' XIV Corps. Advancing towards Kelly Field along the Lafayette Road in a southern move, the 1st-3rd Florida, together with the 47th Georgia Infantry, was separated from the rest of the column and drifted rightwards. Here it faced elements from King's Regular Brigade. Nearly losing its colors during the retreat it reunited with the brigade after the later was repulsed. Then the division shifted its northern elements to the east due to the advance of Gordon Granger's Reserve Corps from the north. Another local advance towards Kelly Field in the afternoon brought in a number of prisoners but could not break the enemy's lines. The regiment lost 9 killed, 70 wounded and 13 missing.

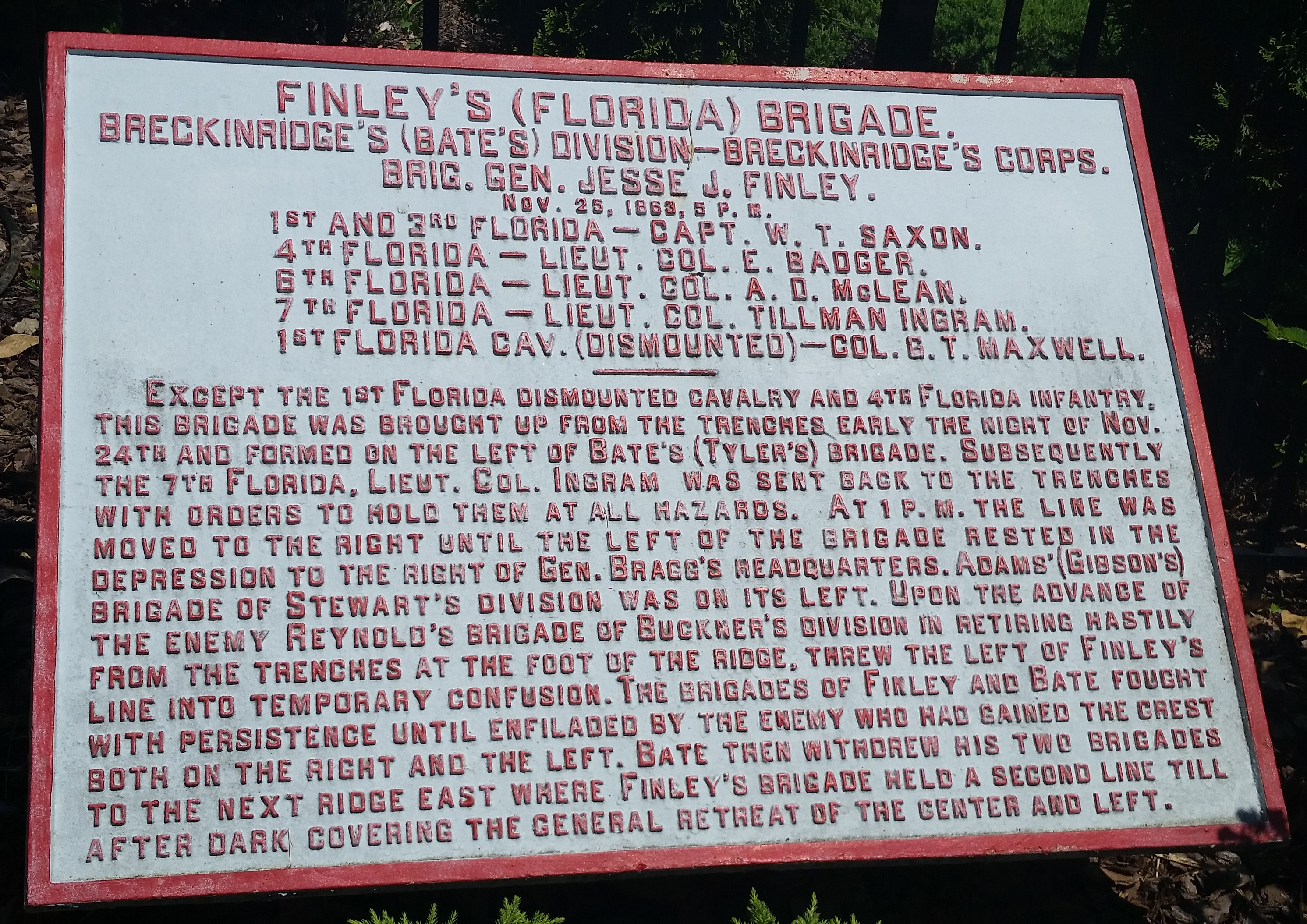
FL marker near Missionary Ridge/Lookout Mountain

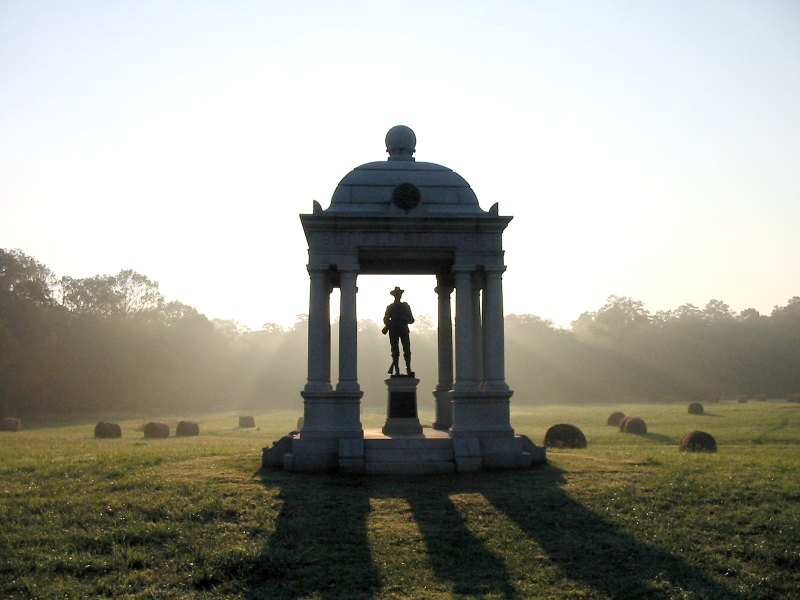
The Chickamauga Florida Monument

When the battle ended in a victory for the South, the Army of Tennessee received the gratitude of their superiors; and the 1st-3rd Florida had 18 of its men put on the Confederate Honor Roll. In early November the Army of Tennessee, still besieging the Union at Chattanooga, Tennessee, to where the federals retreated after Chickamauga, all infantry units from Florida were gathered together into one brigade. Colonel Dilworth, the senior Colonel of the Florida regiments, was on a furlough he was passed for command. Likewise the recommendations for his promotion to brigadier, issued by General Breckinridge and endorsed by General William J. Hardee, was not followed Instead Jesse J. Finley, till now commander of the 6th Florida Infantry, was promoted and assigned. The Florida Brigade consisted of the 1st-3rd, 4th, 6th and 7th Florida Infantry Regiments, as well as the 1st Dismounted Florida Cavalry.

Taking position on Missionary Ridge, the brigade was stationed next to Bragg's headquarters, half in the second line and half in the forward position below the crest. As the army was overwhelmed by the reinforced Union army it tumbled out of position. Parts of the brigade fought in General William B. Bate's makeshift rear-guard and Brigadier Finley receive praise for his command. The brigade continued its service through the rest of 1863, taking part in the moves of General Johnston. When Colonel Dilworth temporarily took command of a brigade, the regiment was commanded by Lt. Col. Elisha Mashburn.

=== 1864 and 1865 ===
In early 1864, the beginning of the Atlanta campaign, the hardships of winter and constant marches took its toll. The regiment, commanded by Mashburn as Dilworth was on sick leave, was no exception. Within months the command changed to Major Ball and in June to Cpt. Matthew H. Strain before Ball took command again. At Resaca the regiment had to endure its worst artillery barrage during the war. Later in the campaign, during the Battle of Marietta, the regiment was in position when corps commander General Leonidas Polk was killed, Col. Dilworth asking the General to search cover only seconds before he was hit by an artillery shell. By this time the 1st-3rd Florida had just 120 men ready for duty.

When the 1st-3rd Florida went with General John Bell Hood into the terrible winter campaign of Franklin-Nashville the command quickly went to Cpt. Strain again, but later developed upon Cpt. A.B. McLeod. When General Nathan B. Forrest and his cavalry were dispatched to raid the area it was accompanied by Bate's division, including the Florida Brigade. At the Third Battle of Murfreesboro the Floridians, who lost their acting brigade commander Colonel Robert Bullock, had to give way; and the numerically inferior and unsupported brigade were pushed back for nearly a mile before the Union troops stopped their advance.

After the retreat from Nashville, the six small regiments were sent to North Carolina where they fought one more battle, the Battle of Bentonville, on 19 March 1865. On the same day General Lee surrendered in Virginia, April 9, 1865, Johnston reorganized his army. The Western Florida Brigade was consolidated and their six regiments were put into a single unit, being the last form of the 1st Florida Infantry Regiment. Under command of Lt. Col. Mashburn the 1st Florida marched in Brigadier James A. Smith's brigade in the division of General John C. Brown, who was their brigade commander at Perryville. When Johnston surrendered at Bennett Place on April 26 the 1st Florida, and so all Floridian units in the Army of Tennessee, had fewer than 200 men present and fit for duty (with just over 400 total). The troops were paroled on May 1, 1865.

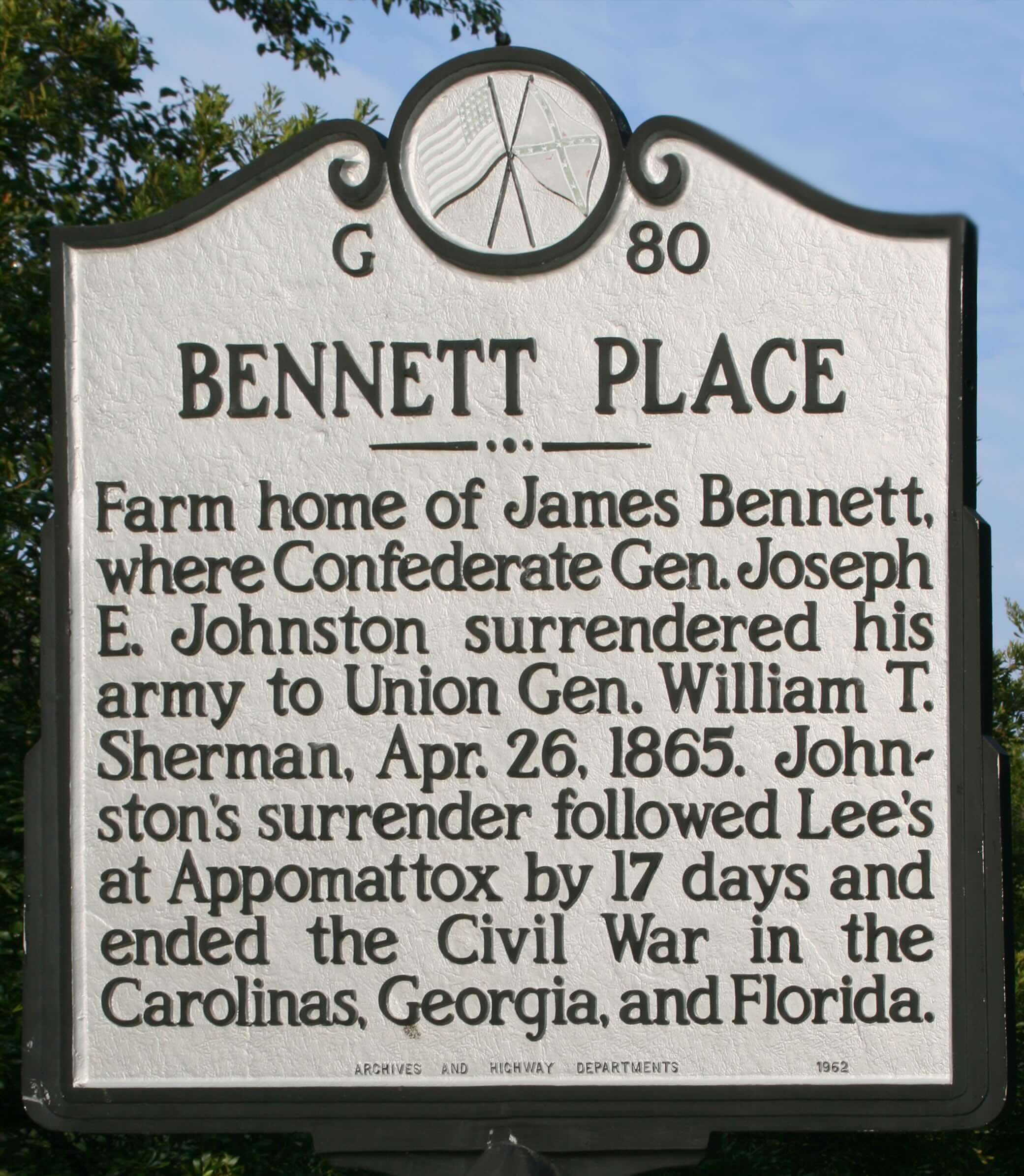
The Bennett Place marker

== Other regimental data ==
=== Commanding officers ===
Col. James Patton Anderson	April/May 1861 – October 12, 1861 (assigned brigade command)
Lt. Col. William K. Beard	October 12, 1861 – April, 1862 (acting, assigned to staff duty)
Maj Thaddeus A. McDonell	April, 1862 – April 6, 1862 (wounded); April 1862 — August 1862 (consolidated)
Cpt. William G. Poole	April 6, 1862 – April 7, 1862 (acting)
Cpt. William C. Beard	April 7, 1862 – April 1862 (acting)
Col. William Miller	August 1862 – December 1862 (wounded & transferred)
Col. William S. Dilworth	December 1862 – July 1864 (frequently detached to command a brigade & on sick leave)
Lt. Col. Elisha Mashburn	1863 – April 26, 1865 (commanded brigade in 1864 & 1865) (commanded the 1st Florida at the surrender)
Maj. Glover A. Ball	1864 (acting, temporarily commanded brigade in 1864)
Cpt. Matthew H. Strain	1864 (acting)
Cpt. A.B. McLeod	1864 (acting)

=== Duty assignments ===
- Army of Pensacola (Sam Jones' Command)
- Patton Anderson's Brigade, Cheatham's Division, Bragg's Corps, Army of Mississippi
- Patton Anderson's Brigade, Ruggles' Division, Bragg's Corps, Army of Mississippi
- Patton Anderson's Brigade, II Corps, Army of Mississippi
- Preston's Brigade, Breckinridge's Division, Hardee's Corps, Army of Tennessee
- Brown's Brigade, Patton Anderson's Division, Hardee's Corps, Army of Tennessee
- Stovall's Brigade, Breckinridge's Division, D.H. Hill's Corps, Army of Tennessee
- Finley's (Florida) Brigade, Breckinridge's Division, D.H. Hill's Corps, Army of Tennessee
- Finley's (Florida) Brigade, Breckinridge's Division, Breckinridge's Corps, Army of Tennessee
- Finley's (Florida) Brigade, Breckinridge's Division, Hindman's Corps, Army of Tennessee
- Finley's (Florida) Brigade, Bate's Division, Hardee's Corps, Army of Tennessee
- Finley's (Florida) Brigade, Bate's Division, Cheatham's Corps, Army of Tennessee
- Smith's Brigade, Brown's Division, Hardee's Corps, Army of Tennessee

=== Confederate Honor Roll for Chickamauga ===
10 soldiers of the 1st and 8 soldiers of the 3rd were inscribed into the Confederate Roll of Honor for their services during the Battle of Chickamauga:

- Sgt Randolph Hernandez, 1st A
- Pvt Henry Taylor, 1st B
- Pvt George M. Williams, 1st C
- Pvt Samuel V. Neeley, 1st D (w)
- Pvt John Wheeler, 1st E
- Sgt E.V. McCaskill, 1st F
- Pvt Alfred Bray, 1st G
- Pvt John Dixon, 1st H
- Sgt E.E. Baggett, 1st I
- Pvt Robert B. McKay, 1st K (w)
- Pvt Robert Curry, 3rd A
- Pvt Lott Allen, 3rd C
- Pvt Jasper N. Caraway, 3rd D
- Pvt Spicer B. Wilds, 3rd F
- Sgt William W. Lamb, 3rd G
- Pvt George Walker, 3rd H
- Pvt M.W.A. Hutchingson, 3rd I
- Pvt C. Gray, 3rd H

== See also ==
- Florida in the American Civil War
- List of Florida Confederate Civil War units
- Western Theater of the American Civil War
