= Michael Connelly (Medal of Honor) =

American Civil War sailor (1843–1881

Michael Connelly, a.k.a. John Mack
- Born: c. 1843; Brooksville, Maine
- Died: November 10, 1881 (aged 37–38)
- Burial place: Saint Mary's Cemetery; Lynn, Massachusetts
- Military career
- Allegiance: United States of America; Union
- Branch: United States Navy; Union Navy
- Rank: Seaman
- Unit: (United States Navy) USS Hendrick Hudson (1859)
- Conflicts: American Civil War • Battle of Natural Bridge
- Awards: Medal of Honor

Michael Connelly (c. 1843 – November 10, 1881) was a United States Navy sailor and a Medal of Honor recipient for his role in the American Civil War. He served under the name John Mack.

Born in about 1843 in Brooksville, Maine, Connelly joined the Navy from that state. By March 5, 1865, he was serving as a seaman on the USS Hendrick Hudson. On that day and the next, he accompanied a Union Army force during the Battle of Natural Bridge near St. Marks, Florida. He helped transport and fire a naval howitzer throughout the engagement despite heavy Confederate fire. For this action, he was awarded the Medal of Honor three months later, on June 22, 1865; the medal was issued under the name "John Mack". He was one of six sailors to receive the medal for manning artillery pieces during the battle, the others being Landsman John S. Lann, Seaman George Pyne, Ordinary Seaman Charles Read, Coxswain George Schutt, and Seaman Thomas Smith.

Connelly's official Medal of Honor citation reads:

As seaman on board the U.S.S. Hendrick Hudson, St. Marks, Fla., 5 and 6 March 1865, Mack served with the Army in charge of Navy howitzers during the attack on St. Marks and, throughout this fierce engagement, made remarkable efforts in assisting transport of the gun. His coolness and determination in courageously standing by his gun while under the fire of the enemy were a credit to the service to which he belonged.

He is buried in Saint Mary's Cemetery in Lynn, Massachusetts. His grave can be found in Section 6, Row 6, Lot 18.

== See also ==
- List of American Civil War Medal of Honor recipients: M–P
