= William Miller (Confederate Army officer) =

American military figure and politician

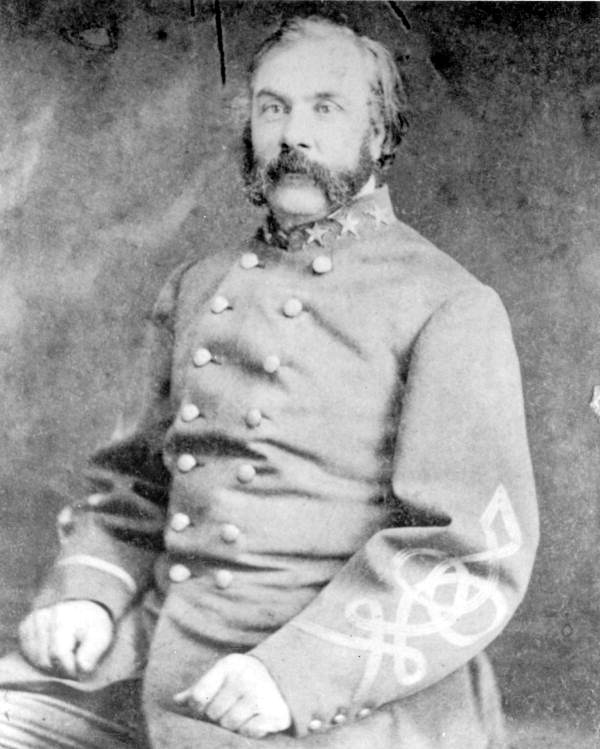
- William Miller
- Born: August 3, 1820; Ithaca, New York, US
- Died: August 8, 1909 (aged 89)
- Burial place: Pensacola, Florida, US
- Military career
- Allegiance: United States; Confederate States of America
- Branch: US Army; Confederate States Army
- Service years: 1846–48 (USA); 1862–65 (CSA)
- Rank: Brigadier General (CSA)
- Commands: 1st Florida Infantry Regiment
- Conflicts: Mexican–American War American Civil War: Battle of Perryville; Battle of Stones River; Battle of Natural Bridge

William Miller (August 3, 1820 – August 8, 1909) was an American soldier, attorney, timberman, and politician. He served as a general in the Confederate States Army during the American Civil War. One of the few Northern-born Confederate generals, he led the reserve troops of the state of Florida and helped win one of the South's last victories of the war at the Battle of Natural Bridge.

== Biography ==
Miller was born in Ithaca, New York, but moved to Louisiana with his family while still a young child. He attended Louisiana College. He was a veteran of the Mexican–American War, serving in the army of Zachary Taylor and was awarded by the government for his service with 40 acres (160,000 m^{2}) of land in Florida. He studied law, passed his bar exam, and engaged in a private practice in Santa Rosa County. He was engaged in the timber and lumber business in northwest Florida prior to the Civil War.

Miller formed a unit, the 3rd Florida Infantry Battalion, and was commissioned as its lieutenant colonel. He and his men eventually were consolidated with the 1st Florida Infantry Battalion, forming the (new) 1st Florida Infantry Regiment. Miller became the regimental colonel in August 1862. Later that year, he fought at the Battle of Perryville, suffering a minor wound, and the Battle of Stones River, where he was severely wounded. He returned home to Florida to recuperate for several months. He was placed in charge of the Confederate Conscript Bureau for Alabama and South Florida.

On August 2, 1864, Miller was promoted to brigadier general and appointed to organize and coordinate the state's reserve troops as the new commander of the Florida District. He raised and commanded the 1st Florida Reserves, a regiment recruited to help defend the state, as most of the regular Confederate troops were serving elsewhere. His most prominent action came at the Battle of Natural Bridge in March 1865, where he served as the tactical field commander in defeating Union forces under John Newton. His men repelled three separate Union attacks during the 12-hour battle. The battle helped keep the state capital, Tallahassee, under Confederate control. It would prove to be the last state capital east of the Mississippi to remain in Confederate hands.

Miller and his men finally surrendered in Tallahassee in May 1865.

After the war, Miller returned to his timber business and also established a farm. He eventually settled in Port Washington in Walton County, where he became the justice of the peace. Miller served two terms in the Florida House of Representatives and the Florida Senate.

== See also ==
- List of American Civil War generals (Confederate)
