= John S. Lanning =

American Civil War Medal of Honor recipient

- Born: August 29, 1843; Rochester, New York
- Died: April 13, 1907 (aged 63)
- Burial place: Yankton, South Dakota
- Military career
- Allegiance: United States of America; Union
- Branch: United States Navy; Union Navy
- Rank: Landsman
- Unit: (United States Navy) USS Magnolia
- Conflicts: American Civil War • Battle of Natural Bridge
- Awards: Medal of Honor

John S. Lanning (August 29, 1843 – April 13, 1907) was a Union Navy sailor and a Medal of Honor recipient for his actions in the American Civil War. He served under the name John S. Lann.

Born on August 29, 1843, in Rochester, New York, Lanning enlisted in the 1st New York Independent Battery Light Artillery (July 1861) and served with said Battery until the battle of Antietam (Sept. 1862). He was seriously injured in this battle and eventually sent home. When he was recovered he tried to return to his group but was told that he was done, go home. So he joined the Navy under the name John S. Lann, from that state. By March 5, 1865, he was serving as a landsman on the USS Magnolia. On that day and the next, he accompanied a Union Army force during the Battle of Natural Bridge near St. Marks, Florida. He helped transport and fire a naval howitzer throughout the engagement despite heavy Confederate fire. For this action, he was awarded the Medal of Honor three months later, on June 22, 1865. The medal was issued under the name he had enlisted with, John S. Lann. He was one of six sailors to receive the medal for manning artillery pieces during the battle, the others being Seaman John Mack, Seaman George Pyne, Ordinary Seaman Charles Read, Coxswain George Schutt, and Seaman Thomas Smith.

Lanning's official Medal of Honor citation reads:

As landsman on board the U.S.S. Magnolia, St. Marks, Fla., 5 and 6 March, Lann served with the Army in charge of Navy howitzers during the attack on St. Marks and throughout this fierce engagement made remarkable efforts in assisting transport of the gun. His coolness and determination in standing by his gun while under the fire of the enemy were a credit to the service to which he belonged.

== See also ==
- List of American Civil War Medal of Honor recipients: G–L
