= USS Hendrick Hudson =

Gunboat of the United States Navy

Coordinates: 23.172°N 82.393°W

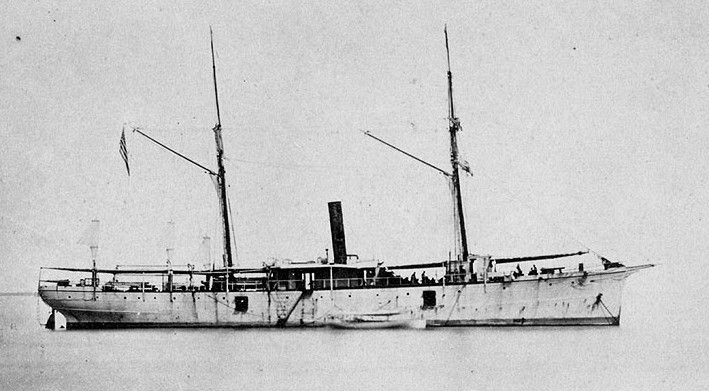
- Hendrick Hudson

History

United States
- Ordered: as Florida
- Launched: 1859
- Acquired: 20 September 1862
- Commissioned: 30 December 1862
- Decommissioned: 8 August 1865
- Captured: by Union Navy forces, 6 April 1862
- Fate: Sold, 12 September 1865; Lost in commercial service 13 November 1867

General characteristics
- Displacement: 460 tons
- Length: 171 ft (52 m)
- Beam: 29 ft 11 in (9.12 m)
- Depth of hold: 9 ft 6 in (2.90 m)
- Propulsion: steam engine; screw-propelled; with sail assist
- Speed: 11 knots
- Armament: four 8" guns; two 20-pounder cannon

USS Hendrick Hudson was a schooner-rigged screw steamer.

== Service history ==
=== CSS Florida ===
Hendrick Hudson was built in Florida in 1859 at Greenpoint, New York. She was taken into the Confederate States Navy in 1862 as CSS Florida. (Note: Conflicting sources: The Confederate States Navy Research Library, Mobile, Alabama claims: *The first cruiser built overseas in England.)

=== USS Hendrick Hudson ===
Hendrick Hudson was captured by the USS Pursuit while attempting to run the blockade at St. Andrews Bay, Florida on 6 April 1862. She was taken to Philadelphia, Pennsylvania for adjudication, where she was condemned and purchased by the United States Department of the Navy from the prize court on 20 September 1862. Renamed Hendrick Hudson, she was commissioned on 30 December 1862 at Philadelphia, Acting Master John E. Giddings commanding. Assigned to the East Gulf Blockading Squadron, Hendrick Hudson sailed to Hampton Roads, Virginia, arriving on 3 January 1863, and from there proceeded to her blockading station off East Pass, St. George's Sound, Florida. On station 1 February, Hendrick Hudson began her long months of arduous blockade duty, working to shut off commerce through the multitude of small inlets and passes of the Florida coast.

She remained off St. George's Sound until late August 1863, capturing schooner Margaret on 1 February and schooner Teresa on 16 April. She then retired to Boston, Massachusetts for repairs and refitting, returning to a new station off the mouth of the Suwannee River on 28 December. Resuming her blockading duties, Hendrick Hudson encountered a small schooner off Key West, Florida on 21 March 1864 and stood toward her. The blockade runner, Wild Pigeon, suddenly turned across Hendrick Hudson's bow, however, and was inadvertently rammed and sunk. None of her assorted cargo could be recovered. The steamer continued her blockading duties through 1864, spending much of her time in busy Tampa Bay and St. Marks, Florida. A group of her men went ashore on an expedition on 12 November and engaged some Confederate soldiers briefly, in one of the many forays ashore by personnel of the East Gulf Squadron.

Hendrick Hudson participated from 27 February to 7 March 1865 in an expedition with Union Army units in the vicinity of St. Marks, Florida. The steamer helped blockade the river and some of her crew went ashore with the Army in an attempt to capture Confederate positions in what came to be known as the Battle of Natural Bridge. Two of the ship's sailors were awarded the Medal of Honor for their part in this battle: Seaman John Mack and Coxswain George Schutt. Following the end of the U.S. Civil War, Hendrick Hudson was not retained in the squadron, and was ordered north on 15 July 1865. She decommissioned on 8 August 1865 at Philadelphia and was sold on 12 September. Hendrick Hudson operated in commercial service until she was wrecked off Havana, Cuba on 13 November 1867. Her passengers and crew were rescued.

== See also ==
- Blockade runners of the American Civil War
- Captured ships of the American Civil War
