= George Schutt =

- Born: c. 1833; Ireland
- Military career
- Allegiance: United States
- Branch: United States Navy
- Rank: Coxswain
- Unit: USS Hendrick Hudson
- Conflicts: American Civil War • Battle of Natural Bridge
- Awards: Medal of Honor

George Schutt (c. 1833 – unknown) was a Union Navy sailor in the American Civil War and a recipient of the U.S. military's highest decoration, the Medal of Honor, for his actions at the Battle of Natural Bridge.

Born in about 1833 in Ireland, Schutt joined the U.S. Navy from the state of New York. By March 5, 1865, he was serving as a coxswain on the USS Hendrick Hudson. On that day and the next, he accompanied a Union Army force during the Battle of Natural Bridge near St. Marks, Florida. He helped transport and fire a naval howitzer throughout the engagement despite heavy Confederate fire. For this action, he was awarded the Medal of Honor three months later, on June 22, 1865. He was one of six sailors to receive the medal for manning artillery pieces during the battle, the others being Landsman John S. Lann, Seaman John Mack, Seaman George Pyne, Ordinary Seaman Charles Read, and Seaman Thomas Smith.

Schutt's official Medal of Honor citation reads:

As coxswain on board the U.S.S. Hendrick Hudson, St. Marks, Fla., 5 and 6 March 1865. Serving with the army in charge of Navy howitzers during the attack on St. Marks and throughout the fierce engagement, Schutt made remarkable efforts in assisting transport of the gun, and his coolness and determination in courageously remaining by his gun while under the heavy fire of the enemy were a credit to the service to which he belonged.
