= USS Pursuit (1861) =

Gunboat of the United States Navy

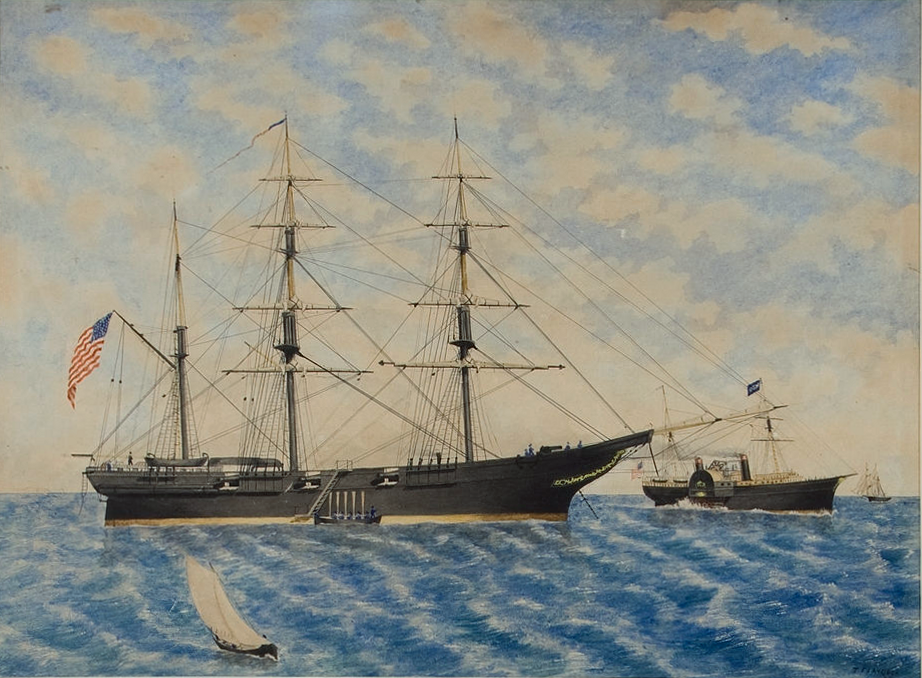
- Period watercolor by amateur artist

History

United States
- Name: USS Pursuit
- Acquired: by purchase 3 September 1861
- Commissioned: 17 December 1861
- Decommissioned: 5 June 1865
- Fate: Sold, 12 July 1865

General characteristics
- Type: Barque
- Tonnage: 600
- Length: 144 ft (44 m)
- Beam: 34 ft 10 in (10.62 m)
- Depth of hold: 15 ft 1 in (4.60 m)
- Speed: 10 knots (19 km/h; 12 mph)
- Complement: 100 officers and enlisted
- Armament: 6 × 32-pounder guns

USS Pursuit was a bark purchased at New York City on 3 September 1861; and was commissioned 17 December 1861, Acting Volunteer Lt. David Cate in command.

== Service history ==
=== Assigned to the Gulf blockade ===
Assigned to the East Gulf Blockading Squadron, she operated off the Florida coast, with several cruises to Cuba, during the course of the American Civil War.

=== Intercepting and capturing blockade runners ===
Operating as named, she captured her first prize, the schooner Anna Belle, off Apalachicola, Florida 6 March 1862. In April she took the sloop La Fayette (4th) and the steamer Florida (6th), both in St. Joseph's Bay near Pensacola, Florida, and on 28 May she ran down the schooner Andromeda off the Cuban coast.

On 27 March 1863, while laying off Gadsden's Point in Tampa Bay, the crew spotted smoke on the beach and three people waving a white flag. Suspecting them to be either runaway slaves or Confederate deserters, the Pursuit sent a boat under a flag of truce. It appeared that two of the people on shore were in women's clothing "with their hands and faces blackened." Upon the boat touching the beach, an ambush was sprung as the three people turned out to be Confederates. Roughly 100 armed men revealed themselves and demanded the boat and its small crew surrender. When the men from the Pursuit refused, the Confederates unleashed a volley, injuring four of the crew including the officer in charge. As the boat pulled away from the beach back to the Pursuit, the ship was able to bring its guns to bear and fired four shells into the group of rebels, seemingly without effect.

On 23 June 1863 she captured the sloop Kate at the mouth of the Indian River and, at the end of December, destroyed two salt works on St. Joseph's Bay.

=== Final Indian River operations ===
Pursuit took her final prizes, the cotton boat Peep O'Day and the British schooner Mary, in the Indian River, 4 December 1864 and 16 March 1865 respectively.

== Decommissioning ==
At the close of the American Civil War she returned to New York where she was decommissioned 5 June 1865 and sold 12 July 1865.

== See also ==
- Union Navy
- Union Blockade
