= John Newton (engineer) =

Union general in the American Civil War, and Chief of the Corps of Engineers

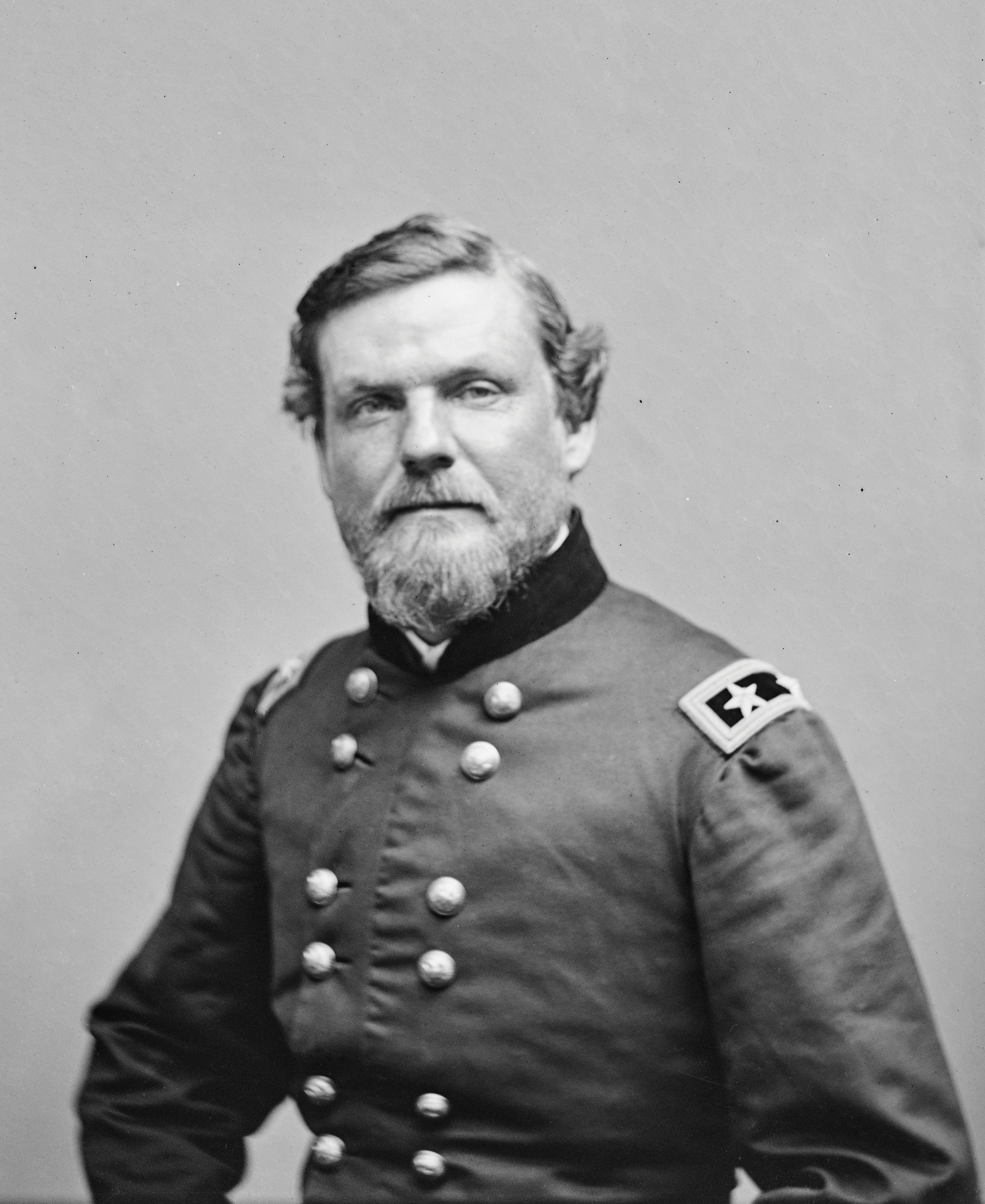
- John Newton by Mathew Brady
- Born: August 24, 1823; Norfolk, Virginia
- Died: May 1, 1895 (aged 72); New York City, New York
- Burial place: West Point National Cemetery
- Military career
- Allegiance: United States of America; Union
- Branch: United States Army; Union Army
- Service years: 1842–1886
- Rank: Major General
- Commands: I Corps; US Army Corps of Engineers
- Conflicts: American Civil War; Peninsula Campaign; Maryland Campaign; Battle of South Mountain; Battle of Antietam; Battle of Fredericksburg; Battle of Salem Church; Battle of Gettysburg; Atlanta campaign; Battle of Peachtree Creek; Battle of Natural Bridge
- Other work: Commissioner of Public Works, New York City (1886–1888); President, Panama Railroad Company (1888–1895)

John Newton (August 24, 1823 – May 1, 1895) was an American general and engineer who served in the Union Army during the American Civil War, and as Chief of the Corps of Engineers in the United States Army. He served as Commissioner of Public Works in New York City and as President of the Panama Railroad Company.

== Early life ==
Newton was born in Norfolk, Virginia, a city his father Thomas Newton, Jr. represented in the U.S. Congress for 31 years. He ranked second in the United States Military Academy class of 1842 and was commissioned in the Corps of Engineers. He taught engineering at the Military Academy (1843–46) and constructed fortifications along the Atlantic coast and Great Lakes (1846–52). He was a member of a special Gulf Coast defense board (1856) and chief engineer, Utah Expedition (1858).

== Civil War ==
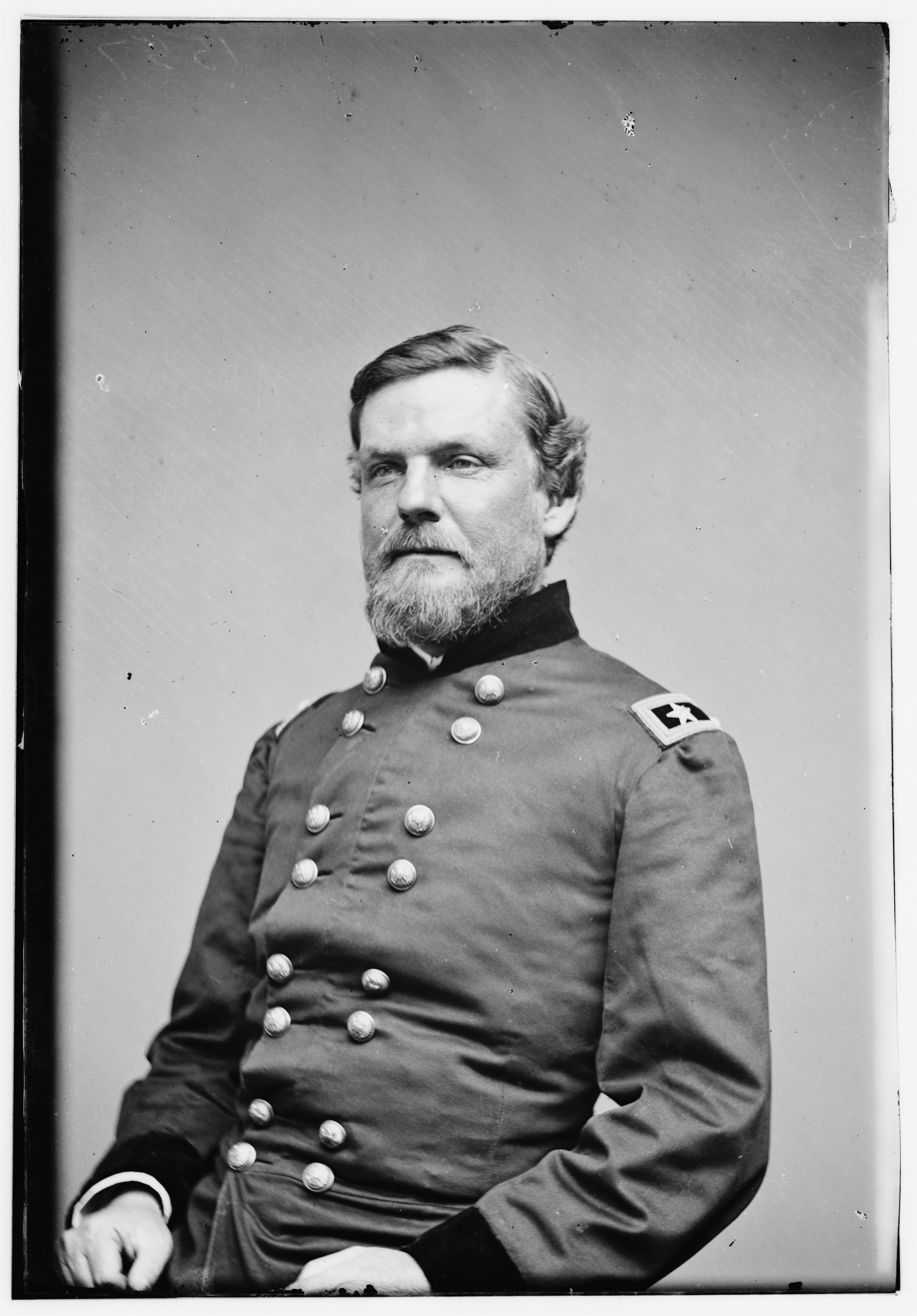
John Newton

Though a fellow Virginian, Newton stood firm for the Union. He helped construct Washington defenses and led a brigade in the Peninsula Campaign. In the Maryland Campaign, at South Mountain, he led a bayonet charge that resulted in taking the enemy position, and also fought at the Battle of Antietam.

As a division commander in the VI Corps, he participated in the Battle of Fredericksburg. After that disastrous defeat, he and other generals journeyed to see President Abraham Lincoln and informed him of their lack of confidence in Army of the Potomac commander, Maj. Gen. Ambrose E. Burnside. This was one of the causes of Burnside's relief in January 1863, but it also damaged Newton's career. He was promoted to major general on March 30, 1863, but Congress never officially confirmed it and the promotion expired a year later.

In the Chancellorsville Campaign, Newton was wounded at Salem Church. At Gettysburg, George Meade named Newton to command of the I Corps after John F. Reynolds was killed in the battle. Command of the corps had fallen to Abner Doubleday, the ranking division commander, but Meade had little regard for Doubleday's fighting ability, dating back to South Mountain, so Meade preferred Newton to command it instead. Newton commanded the I Corps until the start of the Overland Campaign in the spring of 1864, when the I Corps was dissolved and its remnants divided among the II and V Corps. At this point, Newton reverted to the rank of brigadier general and was sent west to serve with William T. Sherman.

In the Atlanta campaign, he commanded the 2nd Division, IV Corps, in Maj. Gen. George H. Thomas's command. He served under Sherman, who regarded him highly. At the Battle of Peachtree Creek, he prevented a dangerous Confederate movement against Sherman and his rapidly constructed works allowed him to turn back the Confederate thrust, a victory that put his official military career back on track.

After the capture of Atlanta, Newton left active field duty and commanded the District of Key West and the Tortugas of the Department of the Gulf from 1864 to 1866. His last campaign resulted in a defeat at the Battle of Natural Bridge in Florida in March 1865, which temporarily enabled the Confederates to hold on to the state capital.

== Postbellum career ==
Returning to the Corps of Engineers, Newton oversaw improvements to the waterways around New York City, into Vermont, and to the Hudson River above Albany. This work is covered in detail in the 2021 book by Thomas Barthel Opening the East River: John Newton and the Blasting of Hell Gate. He also had charge of New York Harbor defenses until he was appointed Chief of Engineers in 1884. He is famed for blowing up two of New York's Hell Gate Rocks, the three acre Hallet's Point Reef with 50,000 pounds of a nitroglycerine compound and the nine acre Flood Rock with 282,730 pounds of dynamite on October 10, 1885, that detonation destroying 730,935,900 pounds of rock. For his extraordinary achievements, he was elected to the prestigious National Academy of Sciences. Newton retired from the Army in 1886 after forty-four years of service, a year short of mandatory retirement at age 64. He served as Commissioner of Public Works, New York City (1886–88), and as President of the Panama Railroad Company (1888–95). Newton died in New York City on May 1, 1895, of complications from heart disease and rheumatism. He was buried at Calvary Cemetery in Woodside, Queens on May 4, 1895, and then reburied at West Point on June 14, 1895.

In 1886, he was awarded the Laetare Medal by the University of Notre Dame, the oldest and most prestigious award for American Catholics. Newton had converted to Catholicism from Protestantism.

In 1899, the Corps of Engineers named a 175-foot paddlewheeler in Newton's honor; the boat was later used as the Minnesota Centennial Showboat until its destruction by fire in 2000.

== See also ==
- List of American Civil War generals (Union)

Military offices
Preceded by Abner Doubleday	Commander of the I Corps (Army of the Potomac); July 2, 1863 – March 12, 1864	Succeeded by James S. Wadsworth
Preceded by James S. Wadsworth	Commander of the I Corps (Army of the Potomac); March 14, 1864 – March 24, 1864	Succeeded by Command absorbed into V Corps (Army of the Potomac)
Preceded by Horatio Wright	Chief of Engineers; March 6, 1884 – August 27, 1886	Succeeded by James Chatham Duane
