= Battle of Natural Bridge =

Battle of the American Civil War

- Part of the American Civil War
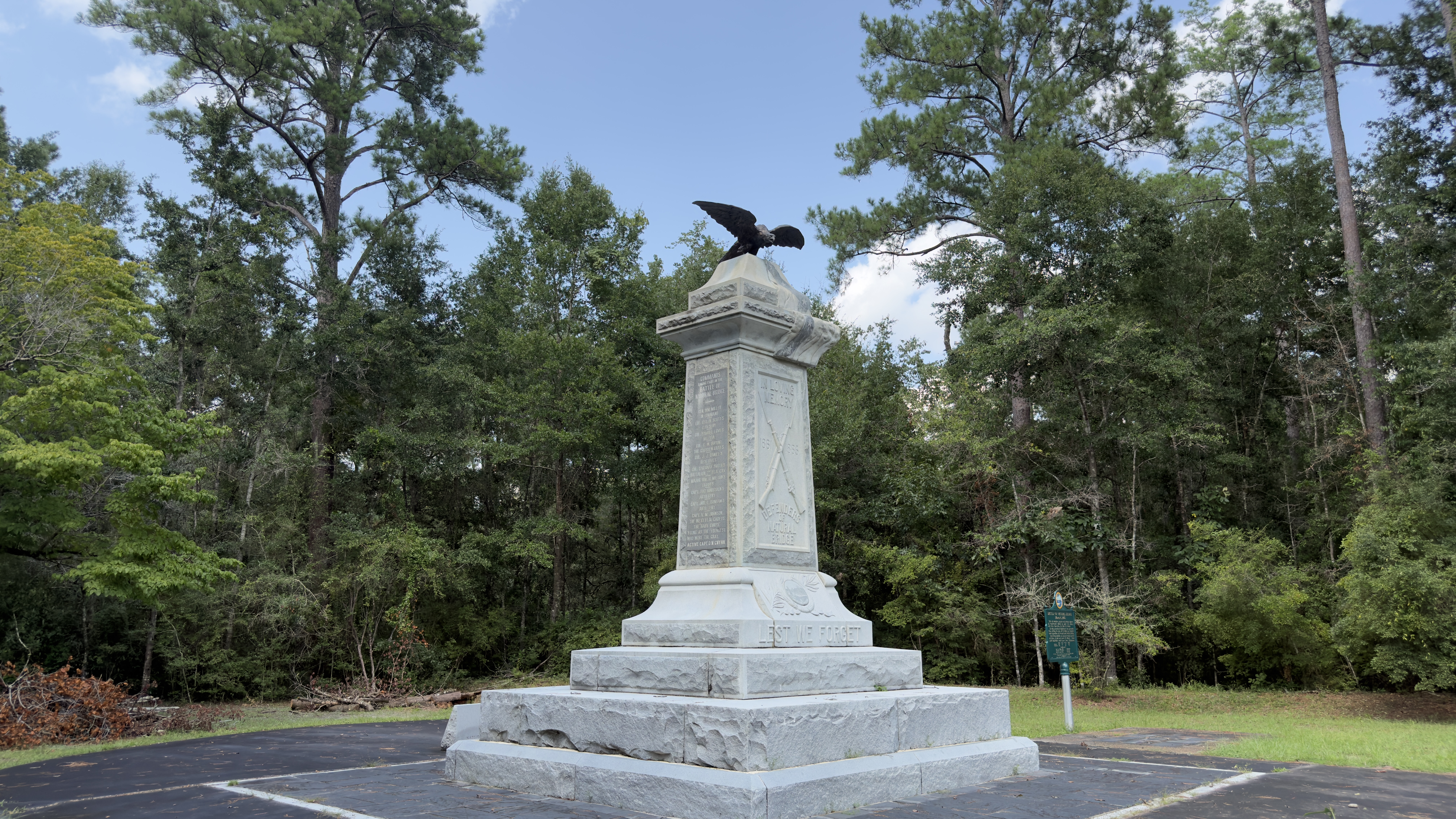
- Natural Bridge Monument
Date	March 6, 1865
Location	Leon County, Florida 30°17′02″N 84°09′07″W
Result	Confederate victory

Belligerents
United States (Union)	(Confederate States of America) CSA (Confederacy)

Commanders and leaders
John Newton	Sam Jones; William Miller

Units involved
2nd Florida Cavalry Regiment; 2nd U.S. Colored Infantry; 99th U.S. Colored Infantry	1st Florida Militia; 5th Florida Cavalry Battalion; Kilcrease Artillery; Dunham’s Battery; Abell's Battery; Company A, Milton Light Artillery; Barwick’s Company Reserves; Hodges' Company Reserves; Companies A, B, and F; Florida Reserves; Reinforcements from Georgia; Florida Military and Collegiate Institute Battalion; 2nd Florida Cavalry (Confederate)

Strength
700	1,000

Casualties and losses
148 total 21 killed 89 wounded 38 captured	26 total 3 killed 23 wounded

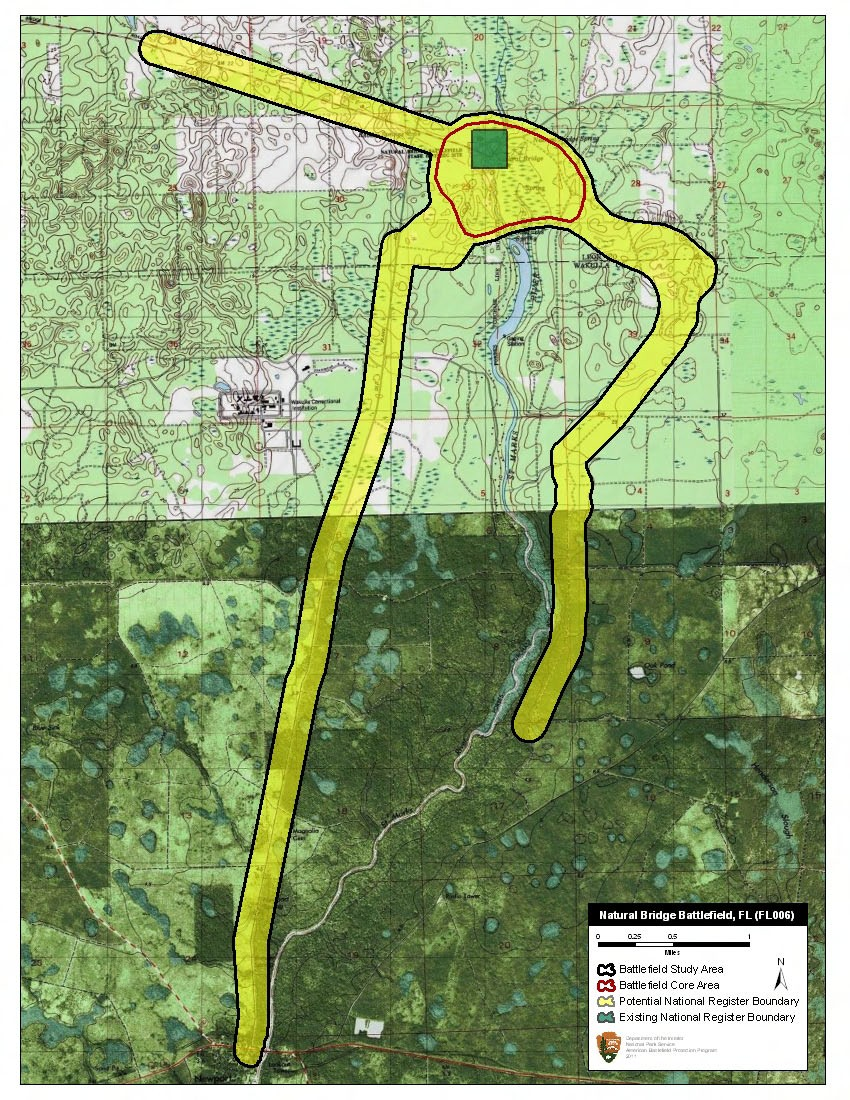
Map of Natural Bridge Battlefield core and study areas by the American Battlefield Protection Program.

The Battle of Natural Bridge was fought during the American Civil War near what is now Woodville, Florida south of Tallahassee on March 6, 1865. A small group of Confederate troops and volunteers, which included teenagers from the nearby Florida Military and Collegiate Institute that would later become Florida State University, protected by breastworks, prevented a detachment of United States Colored Troops from crossing the Natural Bridge on the St. Marks River.

The Natural Bridge is a 1/4-mile-long (400-meter) stretch along which the St. Marks River runs underground, after dropping into a sinkhole.

== Battle ==
The Union's Brig. Gen. John Newton had undertaken a joint force expedition to engage and destroy Confederate troops (FL Cow Cavalry) that had attacked at Cedar Keys and Fort Myers (see Battle of Fort Myers) and were allegedly encamped somewhere around St. Marks. The Union Navy had trouble getting its ships up the St. Marks River. The Union Army force, however, had advanced and, after finding one bridge destroyed, started before dawn on March 6 to attempt to cross the river at Natural Bridge. The Union troops initially pushed Rebel forces back, but not away from the bridge.

Sailors from USS Hendrick Hudson also participated, and two were awarded the Medal of Honor for their part in this battle: Seaman John Mack and Coxswain George Schutt.

Confederate forces under Brigade General William Miller, protected by breastworks, guarded all of the approaches and the bridge itself. The action at Natural Bridge lasted most of the day, but, unable to take the bridge in three separate charges, the Union troops retreated to the protection of the fleet.

Based on the involvement of the students from the Florida Military and Collegiate Institute, the Florida State University Reserve Officer Training Corps (ROTC) program is one of only four Army ROTC programs to have a battle streamer for their actions in the Civil War. Since it was originally part of the Army, FSU's Air Force ROTC unit also displays the same battle streamer.

While the raid was not aimed at Tallahassee, the defeat of the Union force is regarded as keeping Tallahassee as the only Confederate state capital east of the Mississippi River that was not captured by the Union during the war.

== Legacy ==
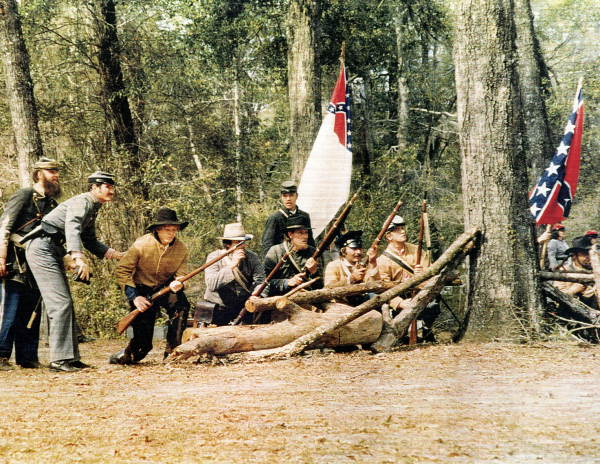
First reenactment of the battle in 1974

The site has been preserved by the Natural Bridge Battlefield Historic State Park. As of mid-2023, the American Battlefield Trust and its partners have acquired and preserved 110 acres (45 hectares) of the battlefield that are now part of the state park.

A ceremony honoring the combatants on both sides of the Battle of Natural Bridge, followed by a reenactment of the battle featuring Union, Confederate, and civilian reenactors, is held at the park the first weekend of March every year. The event is free and open to the public.

== See also ==
- Military history of African Americans in the U.S. Civil War
- United States Colored Troops
- Historical reenactment
- List of Florida state parks
- List of Registered Historic Places in Leon County, Florida
