= Sullivan's Island Historic District =

Historic district in South Carolina, United States

- U.S. National Register of Historic Places
- U.S. Historic district
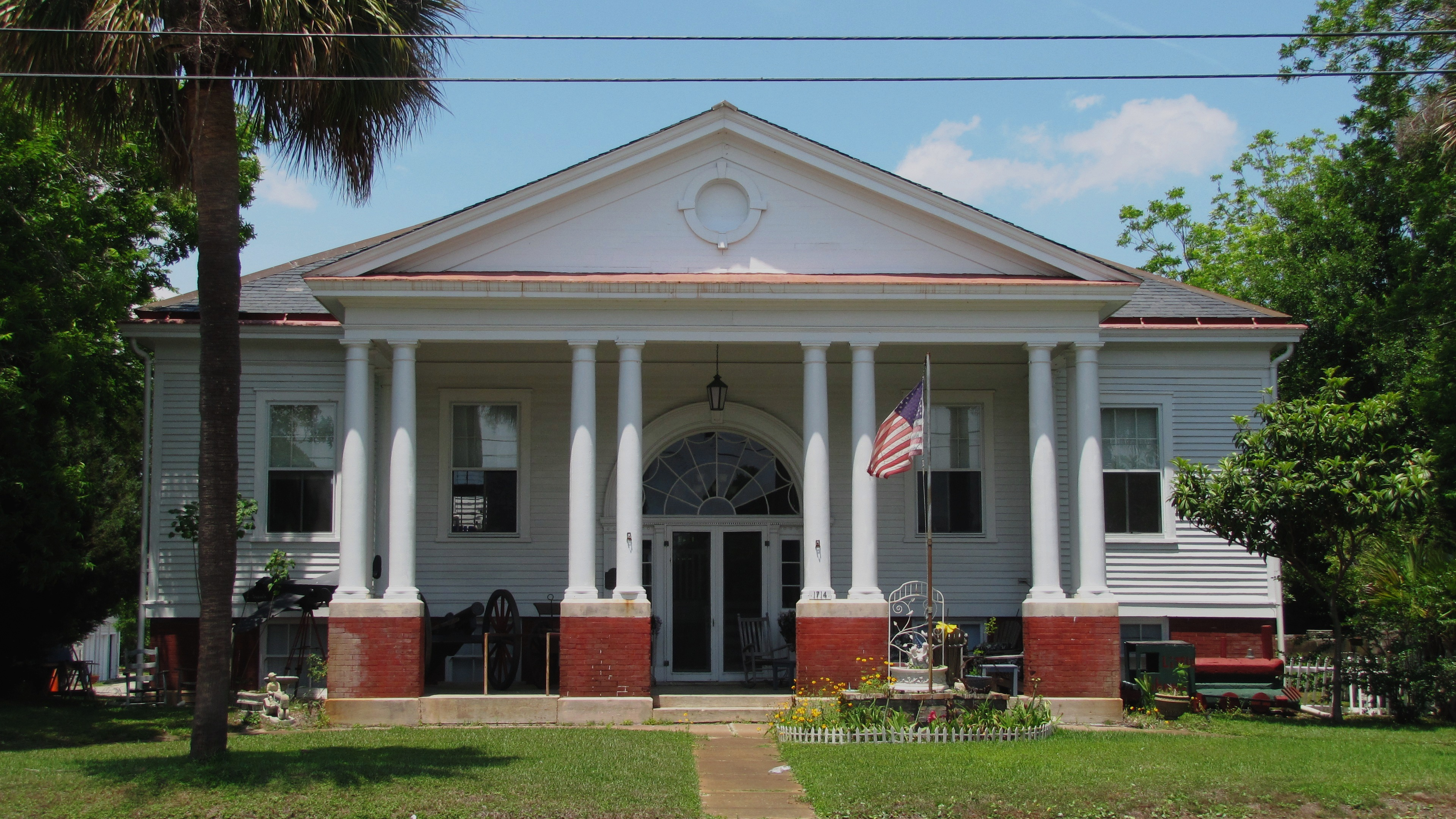
- Post Exchange and Gymnasium, Sullivan's Island Historic District, May 2010

- Location within South Carolina Location within the United States
- Location: Middle St., I'on Ave. and Central Ave. bet. Stations 17 and 18-1/2, Sullivan's Island, South Carolina
- Coordinates: 32°45′33″N 79°50′45″W
- Area: 31.2 acres (12.6 ha)
- MPS: Sullivan's Island, South Island MPS
- NRHP reference No.: 07000929
- Added to NRHP: September 6, 2007

Sullivan's Island Historic District is a national historic district located at Sullivan's Island, Charleston County, South Carolina. The district encompasses 36 contributing buildings on Sullivan's Island. They predominantly include the core residential and administrative areas of Fort Moultrie built between about 1870 to 1950. Also included are representative "Island Houses" and the Post Chapel. Notable buildings include the Base Commander's Quarters, nine Senior Officers' Quarters, ten Junior Officers' Quarters, the Bachelor Officers' Quarters, the Administration Building, the Post Exchange and Gymnasium, and the Electrical Shop.

It was listed on the National Register of Historic Places in 2007.
