= ABC Columbia =

ABC Columbia can refer to:

- KMIZ, the ABC television affiliate in Columbia, Missouri
- WOLO-TV, the ABC television affiliate in Columbia, South Carolina
