= Union National Bank Building =

Union National Bank Building may refer to:

- The Carlyle (Pittsburgh), Pennsylvania, U.S.
- Union National Bank Building (Columbia, South Carolina), U.S.
