= WCOS-TV =

Television station in Columbia, South Carolina (1953–1956)

- Columbia, South Carolina; United States
- Channels: Analog: 25 (UHF)

Programming
- Affiliations: ABC

Ownership
- Owner: Radio Columbia, Inc.

History
- First air date: May 1, 1953
- Last air date: January 21, 1956

Technical information
- ERP: 15.7 kW
- HAAT: 198 m (650 ft)

WCOS-TV (channel 25) was a television station in Columbia, South Carolina, United States. The first television station to broadcast in South Carolina, it was owned by Radio Columbia alongside the WCOS radio stations (1400 AM and 97.9 FM). It operated from 1953 until 1956, when it shut down and sold its assets to competitor WNOK-TV (channel 67) amid a difficult economic environment for UHF television stations.

== History ==
The Federal Communications Commission (FCC) approved construction permit grants for WCOS-TV and WNOK-TV simultaneously in September 1952. Broadcasting from channel 25 began on May 1, 1953; the television station's studios, in a Quonset hut, and transmitter were located off Two Notch Road. (Note: This road later became known as Shakespeare Road, though materials from the period of station operation and the Television Factbook list Two Notch Road.) It decided to operate with a lower effective radiated power than authorized—15,700 watts—because it had been advised by a manufacturer that a transmitter to operate with its full authorized power would not be immediately available. At launch, the primary local shows were a daily sports program and weather report.

When it signed on, WCOS was a primary affiliate of ABC. It also carried select programming from NBC. However, this was a temporary arrangement. NBC Radio's Columbia affiliate, WIS (560 AM), had filed for VHF channel 10—the only assignment on the preferred VHF band available in central South Carolina. A competing application from WMSC (1320 AM) held up adjudication of the prized channel until WIS and WMSC merged their applications in February 1953, clearing the way for channel 10 to sign on that November 7 as WIS-TV. By that time, WNOK-TV had also started with CBS and DuMont programs on September 1. DuMont later moved to channel 25 by 1955.

In the days before the All-Channel Receiver Act, the presence of a VHF station in town, even though channel 25 was not Columbia's only UHF outlet, hurt it economically. In January 1956, WNOK-TV purchased most of WCOS-TV's assets (excluding its physical plant). WCOS-TV then ceased broadcasting on January 21; the WCOS radio stations continued in operation. Television Digest noted that the station "simply could not stand the economic gaff". For the remainder of the 1950s, the Quonset hut was operated as a recording studio for the production of radio commercials and jingles; in 1959, "Stay" by Maurice Williams and the Zodiacs was recorded there.

A local group, First Carolina Corporation, bought the Shakespeare Road facilities and used them to launch a new channel 25 in 1961 under the call letters WCCA-TV. That station, now WOLO-TV, has long claimed WCOS-TV's history as its own, at least as early as 1986. However, FCC history cards for WOLO make no mention of WCOS-TV.
