= WOLO-TV =

Television station in Columbia, South Carolina

- Columbia, South Carolina; United States
- Channels: Digital: 7 (VHF); Virtual: 25
- Branding: ABC Columbia

Programming
- Affiliations: 25.1: ABC; for others, see § Subchannels

Ownership
- Owner: Bahakel Communications; (South Carolina Broadcasting Partners)

History
- First air date: October 1, 1961
- Former call signs: WCCA-TV (1961–1964)
- Former channel numbers: Analog: 25 (UHF, 1961–2009); Digital: 8 (VHF, 2000–2020)

Technical information
- Licensing authority: FCC
- Facility ID: 60963
- ERP: 43.7 kW
- HAAT: 530 m (1,739 ft)
- Transmitter coordinates: 34°6′58.4″N 80°45′49.9″W

Links
- Public license information: Public file; LMS
- Website: www.abccolumbia.com

WOLO-TV (channel 25) is a television station in Columbia, South Carolina, United States, affiliated with ABC and owned by Bahakel Communications. Its studios and business offices are located on Cushman Drive (near US 1) in northeast Columbia. WOLO-TV's transmitter is located on Rush Road in southwestern Kershaw County, near Camden.

WOLO-TV began broadcasting on October 1, 1961, as WCCA-TV. It used the facilities of WCOS-TV, South Carolina's first TV station, which left the air in 1956. It brought Columbia back to having three commercial television stations. Its first owners, First Carolina Corporation, went bankrupt and sold the station to Cy Bahakel in 1964; the call sign was changed to WOLO-TV. It was one of several stations Bahakel upgraded to coincide with the All-Channel Receiver Act making UHF stations more economically viable.

WOLO-TV has perennially been a third-place outlet in local news ratings, lacking investment and, at times, a late local newscast. In the 1990s, it gained a reputation as a station with instability in management and news leadership. Between 2002 and 2005, the newscast was produced entirely from the studios of Bahakel-owned WCCB in Charlotte, North Carolina. From 2005 to 2022, the station's newscasts originated from a streetside studio in downtown Columbia.

== History ==
=== Early years ===
Channel 25 in Columbia was originally occupied by WCOS-TV, South Carolina's first television station. It signed on the air on May 9, 1953, and operated as an ABC affiliate until January 21, 1956, when competitor WNOK-TV bought most of WCOS-TV's assets.

The First Carolina Corporation, a group of local investors, obtained a construction permit from the Federal Communications Commission (FCC) to build a new station on channel 25 on June 1, 1961, after applying on August 5, 1960. Construction was in full swing by the summer. The former physical plant of WCOS-TV on Shakespeare Road was purchased for use by the new station, and a new 348-foot (106 m) tower was erected on the site. The station signed on for the first time on October 1, 1961, as WCCA-TV, using the former WCOS-TV facilities and downtown sales offices in the Hotel Columbia. The FCC granted First Carolina a license to cover the permit on July 24, 1962.

=== Bahakel purchase ===
In 1964, Cy Bahakel bought the station out of bankruptcy and changed its call sign to WOLO-TV, seeking a fresh start. Immediately, work began to add height to the station's tower to increase its coverage area. WOLO announced another upgrade in 1966, with the height going from 522 feet (159 m) to 933 feet (284 m) and an increase in power from 174,000 watts to 550,000 watts. This ultimately materialized in 1969 as an increase to 904,000 watts, followed up in 1981 by a boost to 3.6 million watts from a new 1,149-foot (350 m) tower.

The case of WOLO-TV was not unique. Instead of one VHF station in Chattanooga, Tennessee, Bahakel bought three similar UHF stations: WOLO, WKAB-TV in Montgomery, and WCCB in Charlotte—all ABC affiliates at the time, and two of them off the air—in the same year. All three were then upgraded to increase their coverage areas at the same time that the All-Channel Receiver Act meant that all new sets could receive UHF stations; the three stations had become profitable operations by the early 1980s. Cash flow increased fivefold from 1975 to 1979, and the staff tripled in size.

In the 1970s, even as ABC rose to become the nation's highest-rated network for the first time, WOLO-TV remained stubbornly in third place. This was in part because Bahakel ran the station very cheaply. While its on-air look during this time left much to be desired, it had something of a cult following among students at the University of South Carolina. Before the 1981 power increase, it was frequently knocked off the air due to technical glitches.

In 2001, WOLO activated a new transmitter tower along I-20 outside Camden, one of the tallest structures in South Carolina at 1,764 feet (537.7 m). Prior to then, the station had long been plagued by a weak signal. Although it decently covered Columbia and most of its inner suburbs in Richland and Lexington counties, it only provided grade B signal coverage of the second-largest city in the market, Sumter. Even after the 1981 power increase, it was all but unviewable in some outlying areas. The new tower, in contrast, increased WOLO's coverage by 50 percent, providing at least secondary coverage of 24 counties from Charlotte's outer suburbs to the Pee Dee. It also allowed the station to begin digital broadcasts. The station rebranded from "ABC 25" to "ABC Columbia" in 2005; the move coincided with the return of local news production to the city after three years where the anchors were based at WCCB.

In 2002, the station became the second commercial television station in the Columbia market to sign on a digital signal. WOLO's broadcasts became digital-only, effective June 12, 2009. As part of the SAFER Act, WOLO-TV kept its analog signal on the air until June 26 to inform viewers of the digital television transition through a loop of public service announcements from the National Association of Broadcasters.

Since at least 1986, WOLO has claimed WCOS-TV's history as its own. However, FCC history cards for WOLO make no mention of WCOS-TV.

== News operation ==
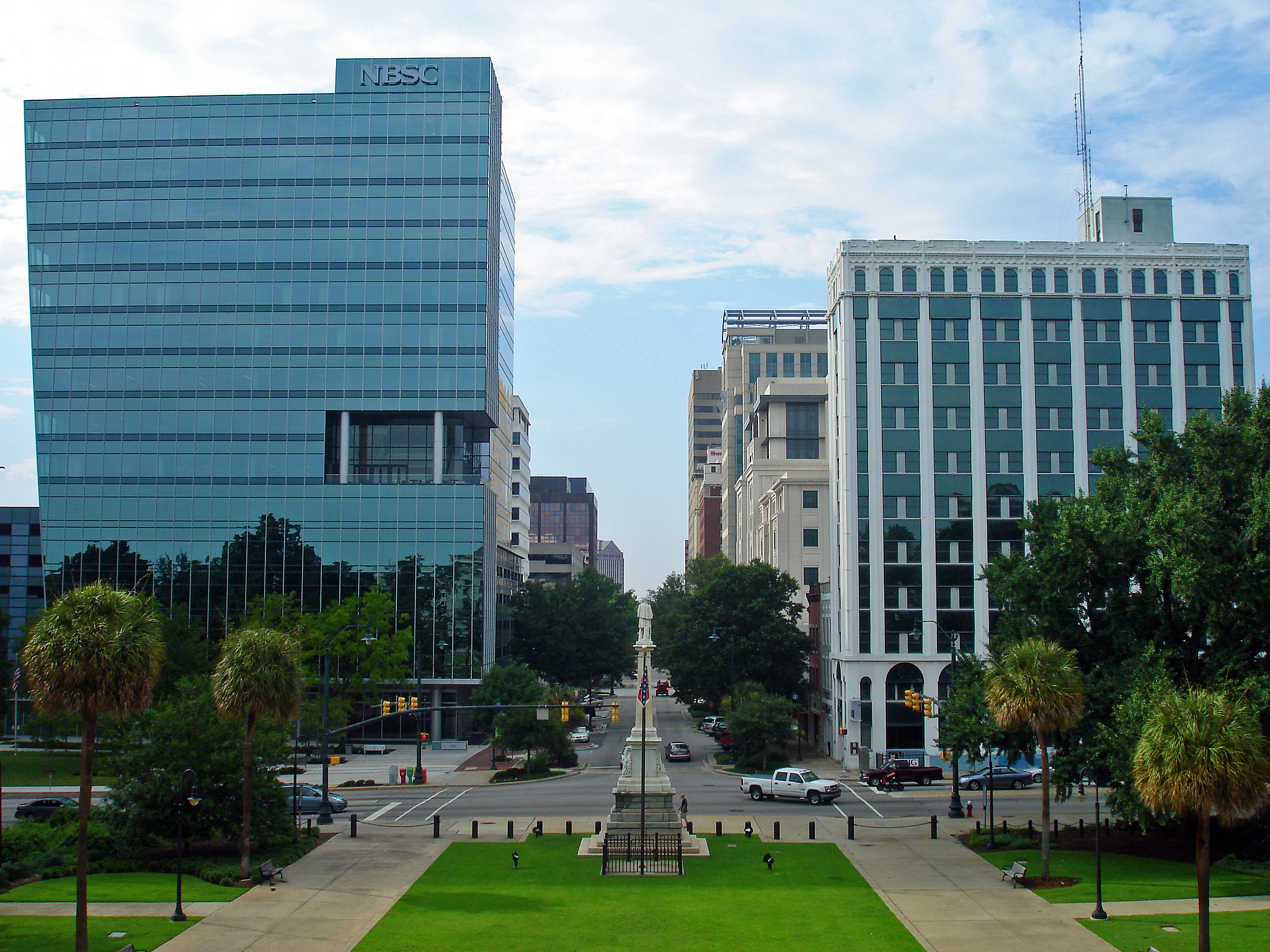
The building at Main and Gervais that previously housed the WOLO-TV newsroom is seen at right

For most of its first four decades, WOLO-TV was the third station in what was essentially a two-station market, in large part due to its weak signal. Its local newscasts languished in a distant third place, well behind WIS and WLTX. Despite this, the station was responsible for several firsts in the Columbia area. In 1977, the station hired Elizabeth Snite to co-anchor the station's evening newscasts, becoming the first female news anchor in the market. The following year, it hired the first certified meteorologist in the market, Bob Richards, and also introduced the first color weather radar system in the area. However, these moves failed to rid WOLO of what The State columnist Doug Nye called an "image of comical ineptness" that stuck with the station for decades. According to Nye, this was largely because of Bahakel's frugal approach to running the station; well into the 1990s, it was the only station in the market that did not broadcast in stereo. In the 1970s, channel 25 was notorious for "skimpy news sets and Crayola-style graphics". Its news desk was little more than a cloth thrown over a fruit box. During storms, rain could be heard pelting the roof of the Quonset hut studio inherited from WCOS-TV. For years afterward, according to former operations director Jim Forrest, whenever the station made an on-air mistake, viewers harrumphed, "same old WOLO".

Channel 25 added an 11 p.m. newscast in 1977, after an earlier attempt failed. This second effort at late news lasted until 1986, but never made much headway against WIS. An 11 p.m. newscast was not restored until 1991, ending a five-year period where WIS offered the only late news in the market.

In the second half of the 1990s, the station made several moves, including hiring Jim Blue and Leslie Mattox as its top anchor team, additional morning and 5 p.m. newscasts, and a rebrand as 25 Eyewitness News, to improve its position. However, just two months after hiring Blue and Mattox, Bahakel fired general manager Carl Bruce after he refused to be reassigned to WBAK-TV in Terre Haute, Indiana. Bruce's successor fired news director Dale Cox soon afterward. According to Nye, this was one of many cases over the years where Bahakel "tightened the purse strings" just as channel 25 was showing promise. At one point in the 1990s, channel 25 was in danger of falling to fourth place behind syndicated programming on Fox affiliate WACH. During this time, WOLO-TV gained a reputation for instability in management and news leadership; it had five station managers from 1990 to 1998 alone.

In 2002, due to concerns it could not afford to convert WOLO to digital broadcasting, Bahakel migrated the station's operations—including production of its newscasts—to the studio facilities of company flagship WCCB in Charlotte. Newsgathering continued to be based in Columbia, maintaining a news director and three teams of reporters to produce the daily newscasts. With the move, WOLO canceled its weekday morning and weekend newscasts, retaining only the weeknight 6 p.m. and 11 p.m. newscasts, and laid off several Columbia-based employees, including both of its anchors. This was one of the largest-market examples of "centralcasting" (the practice of housing master control and/or other operations for multiple stations out of one facility) in the United States. During this period, WOLO's newscasts remained deep in last place, never drawing more than a tenth of WIS's viewership. After the company's financial picture improved and allowed it to afford more digital conversion costs, in 2005, Bahakel Communications moved production of WOLO's newscasts back to Columbia, from a new purpose-built streetside news studio located across from the State House in the historic Union National Bank Building.

On August 1, 2011, WOLO restored a weekday morning newscast to its schedule after nine years with the debut of an hour-long program at 6 a.m. titled Good Morning Columbia and the return of a noon newscast. In 2015, it hired two former WIS personalities, evening anchor Ben Hoover after his departure from the NBC affiliate back in 2014, and former WIS chief meteorologist John Farley.

By 2022, WOLO had left the Union National Bank Building, which was being eyed for conversion into a boutique hotel; a bar in the building also was forced to leave by the new owners. As of June 2025, the station produced 23 1/2 hours a week of local news programming.

=== Notable former on-air staff ===
- Bob Richards – meteorologist, 1978–1979

== Subchannels ==
WOLO-TV's transmitter is located on Rush Road in southwestern Kershaw County, near Camden. The station's signal is multiplexed:

Subchannels of WOLO-TV
Subchannel	Res.	Short name	Programming
25.1	720p	WOLO-DT	ABC
25.2	480i	WOLO-ST	Start TV
25.3	480i	QVC-TV	QVC
25.4	480i	WOLO-ME	MeTV
25.5	480i	WOLO-HI	Heroes & Icons
25.6	480i	WOLO-DB	Dabl
25.7	480i	WOLO-ST	Story Television
25.8	480i	HSN-TV	HSN
25.9	480i	MeTOONS	MeTV Toons
25.10	480i		Newsmax2
