= Moultrieville Historic District =

Historic district in South Carolina, United States

- U.S. National Register of Historic Places
- U.S. Historic district
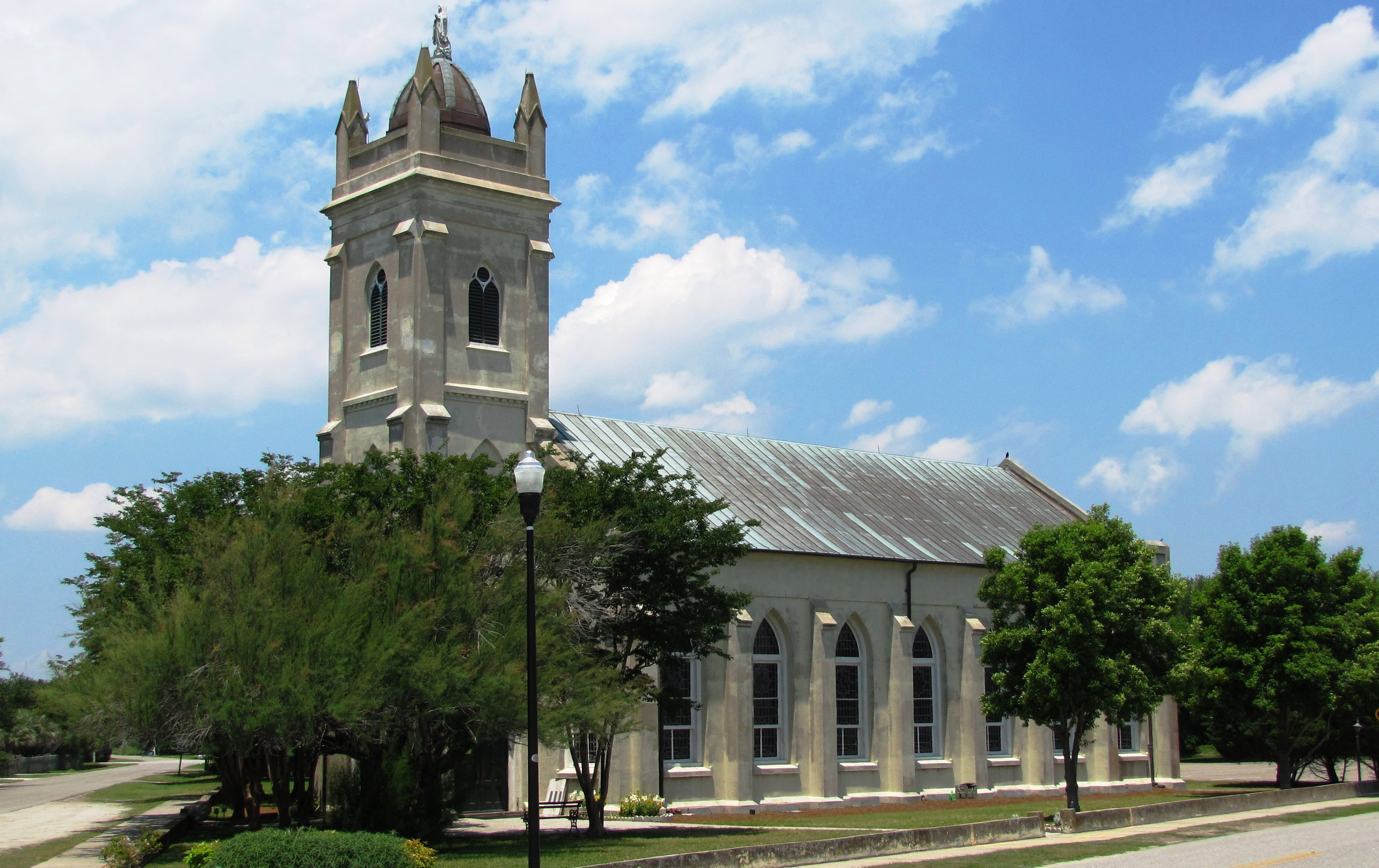
- Stella Maris Catholic Church, Moultrieville Historic District, May 2010

- Location within South Carolina Location within the United States
- Location: Middle St. and Osceola Ave., bet. stations 11 and 12, Sullivan's Island, South Carolina
- Coordinates: 32°45′39″N 79°51′33″W
- Area: 14.2 acres (5.7 ha)
- MPS: Sullivan's Island, South Island MPS
- NRHP reference No.: 07000928
- Added to NRHP: September 6, 2007

Moultrieville Historic District is a national historic district located at Sullivan's Island, Charleston County, South Carolina. The district encompasses 18 contributing buildings and 1 contributing site in Moultrieville. They predominantly include frame residences built between about 1830 to 1930 which are known as "Island Houses." Also located in the district are the Stella Maris Catholic Church (1869-1873) and Fort Moultrie Torpedo Shed/Mines Storehouse (c. 1905).

It was listed on the National Register of Historic Places in 2007.
