= Battery Gadsden =

- U.S. National Register of Historic Places
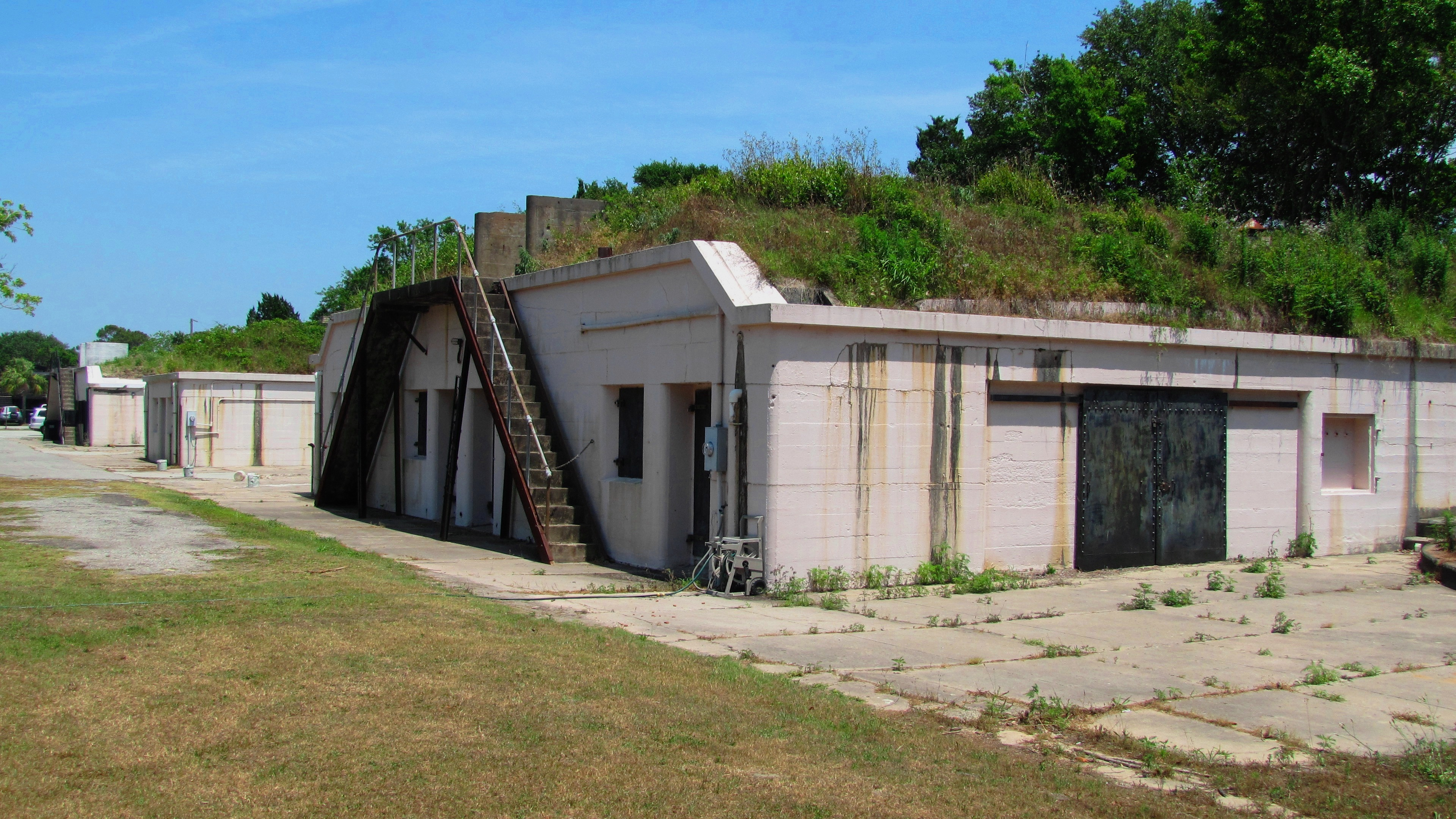
- Battery Gadsden, May 2010

- Location within South Carolina Location within the United States
- Location: 2017 Ion Ave., Sullivan's Island, South Carolina
- Coordinates: 32°45′36″N 79°50′23″W
- Area: 0.5 acres (0.20 ha)
- Built: 1903-1904
- Built by: Howell, Capt. G. P.
- NRHP reference No.: 74001842
- Added to NRHP: June 25, 1974

Battery Gadsden is a historic artillery battery located at Sullivan's Island, Charleston County, South Carolina. It was built in 1903–1904, and is one of a series of batteries stretching from Fort Moultrie to the eastern end of Sullivan's Island. It was named after Christopher Gadsden. Until decommissioned in 1917, the concrete battery housed four, six inch guns. It measures approximately 377 feet long and 84 feet wide, with the front or ocean side of the battery at approximately 7 feet high. Battery Gadsden and its neighbor Battery Thomson provided fortification at the mouth of Charleston Harbor. The battery now houses the Edgar Allan Poe Branch of the Charleston County Public Library. It was built at the same time as Battery Jasper.

It was listed on the National Register of Historic Places in 1974.
