= WLTX =

Television station in Columbia, South Carolina

- Columbia, South Carolina; United States
- Channels: Digital: 15 (UHF); Virtual: 19
- Branding: WLTX 19; News19

Programming
- Affiliations: 19.1: CBS; for others, see § Subchannels

Ownership
- Owner: Tegna Inc., a subsidiary of Nexstar Media Group; (Pacific and Southern, LLC)

History
- First air date: September 1, 1953
- Former call signs: WNOK-TV (1953–1977)
- Former channel numbers: Analog: 67 (UHF, 1953–1961), 19 (UHF, 1961–2009); Digital: 17 (UHF, 2002–2019)
- Former affiliations: All secondary: DuMont (1953–1955); ABC (1956–1961); UPN (1995–1997)
- Call sign meaning: From former owner Lewis Television

Technical information
- Licensing authority: FCC
- Facility ID: 37176
- ERP: 700 kW
- HAAT: 531.7 m (1,744 ft)
- Transmitter coordinates: 34°5′50″N 80°45′50″W

Links
- Public license information: Public file; LMS
- Website: www.wltx.com

WLTX (channel 19) is a television station in Columbia, South Carolina, United States, affiliated with CBS. Owned by the Tegna subsidiary of Nexstar Media Group, the station maintains studios on Garners Ferry Road (US 76–378) in southeastern Columbia, and its transmitter is located on Screaming Eagle Road (southeast of I-20) in rural northeast Richland County.

WLTX is Columbia's oldest continuously operating television station, going on the air in September 1953 as WNOK-TV on ultra high frequency (UHF) channel 67. Built by Columbia radio station WNOK (1230 AM), it struggled in its first years on air as Columbia's lone very high frequency (VHF) station, WIS (channel 10), used that position to become the dominant TV station in central South Carolina. The station endured in the shadow of its much larger competitor and moved to the lower channel 19 in 1961. The WNOK stations were sold to Julius Curtis Lewis Jr. in 1977; the TV station was given its present call letters, WLTX.

For most of its first four decades on the air, the station was a distant runner-up to WIS. For much of that time, it only offered one daily newscast, even after a substantial power increase in 1985. However, in the final years of Lewis ownership and after WLTX's purchase by Gannett in 1998, the news department was significantly expanded in facilities, personnel, and newscasts offered. In the quarter-century since Gannett (later Tegna) acquired the station, it has become the most substantial challenger ever faced by once-dominant WIS and has even overtaken it on occasion.

== History ==
=== WNOK-TV ===
On August 15, 1951, Palmetto Radio Corporation, owner of WNOK (1230 AM), applied to the Federal Communications Commission (FCC) seeking to build a new TV station on channel 10 in Columbia. It had previously bid for channel 7, but that allocation was moved to Spartanburg after heavy lobbying from Governor and Spartanburg resident James F. Byrnes.

In May 1952, with the possibility looming of a contest for channel 10—now the only available very high frequency (VHF) allocation in central South Carolina—and two parties seeking channel 25 in the new ultra high frequency (UHF) band, Palmetto Radio amended its application to specify the only other commercial allocation for Columbia, channel 67. When the FCC made its way through a priority list of station applications to Columbia, channels 25 and 67 were uncontested, and on September 18, 1952, the commission moved to grant Palmetto Radio a construction permit for channel 67. On the same day, it granted Radio Columbia, owner of WCOS (1400 AM), a construction permit for channel 25.

WNOK-TV began broadcasting on channel 67 on September 1, 1953, as an affiliate of CBS and the DuMont Television Network. It used DuMont Laboratories's second high-power UHF transmitter installed (the first having been at WGLV in Pennsylvania). It signed on four months after WCOS-TV on May 1. They were joined by WIS-TV (channel 10) on November 7.

Palmetto Radio's decision to drop out of the bidding for channel 10 quickly came back to haunt it. WIS was the only station that Columbia-area viewers could receive without buying a UHF converter. Even with a converter, UHF reception was marginal at best. This left both WNOK-TV and WCOS-TV far behind WIS, which became the dominant television station in the Midlands of South Carolina. Dick Laughridge, a station employee from 1953 to 1999 and general manager for the last 21 years of his tenure, described having to buy UHF converters for the station's advertisers just so they could see their own advertisements on channel 67. When WCOS-TV folded in January 1956 for economic reasons, WNOK-TV acquired its business assets but not its physical plant. Channel 67 then began airing selected ABC programs.

Nearly from the start, Palmetto Radio sought to improve the visibility of its television station by adding a second VHF channel to Columbia. Soon after buying WCOS-TV's assets, it asked the FCC to move channel 5 from Charleston to Columbia. This would have forced Charleston's WCSC-TV to move from channel 5. The FCC invited comment on the proposal, but it was denied nearly a year later. Palmetto Radio later sought to move channel 8, but this bid failed as well. In 1960, with a second attempt to build a station on channel 25 (WCCA-TV, today's WOLO-TV) on the horizon, WNOK instead proposed changing Columbia to have UHF channels 14, 25, and educational 31 instead of educational 19, 25, and 67. The FCC chose to instead switch channel 19 to commercial use, move WNOK-TV there, and allocate channel 31 for educational use by moving it from Lancaster. On June 12, 1961, the station switched to the lower channel 19.

In 1966, the Hotel Jefferson, which had housed the studios of WNOK radio and television, was sold to the Citizens & Southern National Bank, which announced plans to build an office tower on the site. Though the hotel closed in April 1966, the WNOK stations continued to hold a lease on the studio site through June 1967. A new facility would be necessary. In August, Palmetto Radio Corporation broke ground on a new studio and office complex on Garners Ferry Road, which would be twice as large as the old facility and feature two television studios. The stations moved into the facility in June 1967. Following the studio move, Palmetto Radio upgraded the station's effective radiated power to 1.25 million watts, improving its signal and adding several areas to the east like Sumter to its city-grade coverage. It began producing live local programs in color in 1968.

=== WLTX: Lewis Television ownership ===
Palmetto Radio Corporation announced in April 1977 it would sell WNOK radio and television to Lewis Broadcasting, a company owned by Savannah, Georgia businessman and politician Julius Curtis Lewis Jr., for $4 million. When the sale took effect in April 1978, Lewis changed the station's call sign from WNOK-TV to WLTX. While the radio stations remained under common ownership, station officials wanted to change channel 19's image. Laughridge said that the WLTX call letters would be easier to promote and easier for viewers to remember.

In 1984, Lewis applied for a nearly five-fold increase in WLTX's effective radiated power from a new tower northeast of Columbia. The new facility would operate at five million watts, the maximum power allowed for analog UHF stations. The new tower would be the tallest in the market and give WLTX a coverage area comparable to that of WIS. The new facility and 2,049-foot (625 m) tower were activated in June 1985. It doubled the station's coverage area, providing secondary Grade B coverage as far east as Florence, as far north as Lancaster, and as far west as Aiken. It also gave the station primary coverage of outer suburbs like Orangeburg and Newberry; these areas had only received a Grade B signal.

In January 1995, WLTX began airing United Paramount Network (UPN) programming on a secondary basis, beginning first with Star Trek: Voyager and expanding at UPN's insistence to additional network programming that fall. Citing scheduling difficulties, WLTX dropped UPN programs in September 1997. The market was without UPN programming until Sumter-licensed WQHB (channel 63) signed on that November.

=== Gannett/Tegna ownership ===
The Gannett Company announced in February 1998 that it would acquire WLTX from Lewis, a move that came as the Lewis family was planning their estate and seeking a buyer. With the move, Laughridge, who had served as general manager for over 20 years, announced his retirement. It came at a time when WLTX beat WIS in total-day viewership for the first time in history, though the improving news department was still far behind channel 10. The purchase closed at the end of April. A renovation and expansion of the Garners Ferry Road studio, started in 2000 and completed in 2001, added another 8,000 square feet (740 m^{2}) to the facility; the addition housed the newsroom, studio control, and several offices. In 2002, WLTX became the first commercial station in Columbia to broadcast in digital.

WLTX's broadcasts became digital-only, effective June 12, 2009. The station later relocated its signal from channel 17 to channel 15 on September 6, 2019, as a result of the 2016 United States wireless spectrum auction.

On June 29, 2015, the Gannett Company split in two, with one side specializing in print media and the other side specializing in broadcast and digital media. WLTX was retained by the latter company, named Tegna. Nexstar Media Group acquired Tegna in a deal announced in August 2025 and completed in March 2026.

== News operation ==
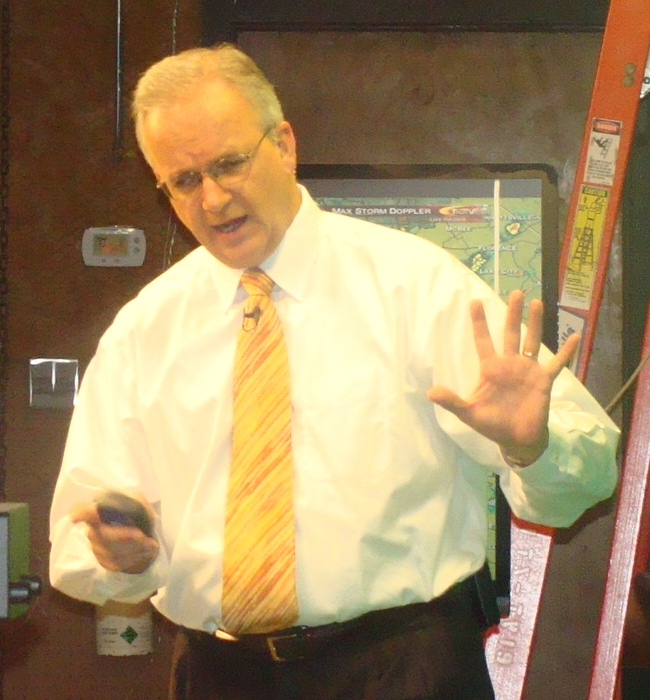
Gannett hired popular meteorologist Jim Gandy from WIS in 1998, then brought him to WLTX at the end of 1999.

WLTX spent most of its history as a distant runner-up to WIS in the market. By the 1970s, it had cut back its 11 p.m. local newscast to a five-minute update. Even that was dropped later in the decade due to low ratings. According to longtime anchor Gene Upright, who also served as channel 19's program director, station officials decided to drop the 11 p.m. update and concentrate on the 6 p.m. dinner-hour newscast shortly before he arrived. Upright said that at the time, WLTX did not have nearly enough staffers to make a credible effort against WIS in the late news slot. For the next two decades, WLTX competed against WIS at 11 p.m. with syndicated shows, most notably The Andy Griffith Show, which was far more competitive with the WIS 11:00 Report and often finished in second place in its time slot. As late as the 1980s, Upright believed any attempt to run an 11 p.m. newscast would have not only trailed WIS, but also perennial third-place finisher WOLO-TV.

WLTX began adding more news updates in the latter years of the tenure of Dick Hall, the news director for 13 years under Lewis ownership. Hall left for WKXT-TV in Knoxville, Tennessee, in 1991, wanting to work in a more competitive market. After taking the role in 1993, Carolyn Powell made a concerted effort to add a full schedule of news. As part of that effort, she began gradually scaling up channel 19's news department to a more typical size for a medium-market station, with the eventual intent of making News 19 "a seven-day news operation". Between 1993 and 1995, Powell added five-minute 11 p.m. news updates on weekdays and Saturdays, a 15-minute update on Saturdays at 6 p.m., and a full 30-minute newscast at 6 p.m. on Sundays. A full 30-minute newscast at 11, seven nights a week, began airing in March 1996. In conjunction with a revamped format for CBS This Morning, the station began broadcasting a 7 a.m. morning newscast that August; a midday newscast debuted in September 1997.

The Gannett purchase led to wholesale changes throughout 1999. Gannett brought in Rich O'Dell, an executive from WKYC-TV in Cleveland, as general manager and hired a new news director. Longtime WLTX personalities, including Upright and weather presenter Camille Bradford Hugg, moved to new off-air jobs or retired. In August 1999, to accommodate the launch of The Early Show by CBS, WLTX replaced its 7 a.m. morning news with a two-hour broadcast at 5 a.m. At year's end, on December 31, the centerpiece of the strategy debuted on air in the person of former longtime WIS meteorologist Jim Gandy. The previous year, Gannett had hired Gandy as a consultant while he waited out a one-year non-compete clause in his contract with channel 10; when the move was announced, he was widely expected to return to Columbia and forecast the weather on WLTX after the year was up, which proved to be the case. Channel 19 also added a Doppler weather radar system to bolster its weather forecasts.

The substantial changes in WLTX's news product did not immediately lead to a ratings boost, but by 2001, WLTX was giving WIS its most credible competition ever, aided by the strong performance of CBS network programming such as Survivor. It beat WIS at noon in two ratings surveys, a first for the market. A 7 p.m. newscast—the first-ever challenge to WIS's popular 7:00 Report—debuted in late 2001 after the September 11 attacks. However, WIS was able to successfully fend off the challenge and keep WLTX in second place, particularly in the 6 and 7 p.m. newscasts. Looking for a further lift, in late 2002, WLTX moved the anchor duo of J. R. Berry and Darci Strickland, both South Carolina natives, from the morning newscasts to the evening newscasts. The move kept WLTX competitive; its ratings remained behind WIS in total households but sometimes pulled ahead in key demographics with desirable younger viewers. One of the few holdovers from the pre-Gannett WLTX was in the area of sports: sports director Bob Shields, who created a regional high school Player of the Week award while at channel 19 and retired from broadcasting in 2010 after 30 years.

WLTX was awarded the prestigious Alfred I. duPont–Columbia University Award in 2015 for DSS: When the System Fails, its series of reports on the dysfunction of South Carolina's Department of Social Services.

Gandy retired in 2019 after 44 years in broadcasting. That year, Broadcasting & Cable magazine honored O'Dell as its general manager of the year in a non-top-50 market, citing an improvement in the station's ratings that allowed it to break WIS's dominance of the Columbia market. Channel 19 bested channel 10 in early evening news and significantly closed the gap in the late news slot. The station also surged ahead of WIS among adults 25–54; a three-share point deficit among that demographic in 2017 had become a 12-point lead by 2019. O'Dell credited WLTX's piloting of Tegna's "Street Squad" community reporting model as a factor in the ratings boost.

=== Notable former on-air staff ===
- Matt Barrie – sportscaster
- Joel Connable – reporter
- Natasha Curry – reporter, weekend anchor in the early 2000s
- Ainsley Earhardt – reporter, weekend anchor in the early 2000s

== Subchannels ==
WLTX's transmitter facility is located on Screaming Eagle Road (southeast of I-20) in rural northeast Richland County. The station's signal is multiplexed:

Subchannels of WLTX
Subchannel	Res.	Short name	Programming
19.1	1080i	WLTX-HD	CBS
19.2	480i	Crime	True Crime Network
19.3	480i	ShopLC	Shop LC
19.4	480i	Quest	Quest
19.5	480i	NEST	The Nest
19.6	480i	NOSEY	Nosey
19.7	480i	OPEN	Antenna TV
19.8	480i	OPEN	[Blank])
