= Atlanticville Historic District =

Historic district in South Carolina, United States

- U.S. National Register of Historic Places
- U.S. Historic district
- Location within South Carolina Location within the United States
- Location: Middle St., Jasper Blvd., Myrtle Ave. bet. Stations 22-1/2 and 26, Sullivan's Island, South Carolina
- Coordinates: 32°45′55″N 79°49′57″W
- Area: 38.3 acres (15.5 ha)
- MPS: Sullivan's Island, South Island MPS
- NRHP reference No.: 07000927
- Added to NRHP: September 6, 2007

Atlanticville Historic District is a national historic district located at Sullivan's Island, Charleston County, South Carolina. The district encompasses 45 contributing buildings, 1 contributing site, and 1 contributing structure in Atlanticville. They predominantly include frame residences built between about 1880 to 1950 which are known as “island houses.” Also located in the district are the Chapel of the Holy Cross and the Sullivan's Island Graded School.

It was listed on the National Register of Historic Places in 2007.
