= Bob Richards (meteorologist) =

American television meteorologist

Robert "Bob" Richards (January 10, 1956 – March 23, 1994), born Robert L. Schwartz, was an American local television personality on KSDK in St. Louis, Missouri, where he worked as chief meteorologist in the 1980s and early 1990s. He began his career as a meteorologist at WOLO-TV in Columbia, South Carolina; WATE-TV in Knoxville, Tennessee; and WSB-TV in Atlanta before leaving to join The Weather Channel. While at WATE, he earned the Seal of Approval from the American Meteorological Society. Because of The Weather Channel's connection to its founder John Coleman, former weather forecaster for ABC's Good Morning America, Richards occasionally filled in on that show's morning broadcasts. Later he moved on to the short-lived Satellite News Channel before joining KSDK in 1983.

Richards' death resulted from a plane crash, which is thought to have been suicide due to his anxiety over an alleged extra-marital affair that was increasingly becoming public knowledge. After a radio interview in which his former girlfriend provided messages he had left on her phone answering machine, Richards became despondent. After delivering the 10pm weather report on the night of March 23, 1994, Richards took off from Spirit of St. Louis Airport in Chesterfield, Missouri, and flew his plane, a Piper Cherokee, into the ground.

== See also ==
- Suicide by pilot
