= Fort Moultrie =

- Part of Fort Sumter and Fort Moultrie National Historical Park
- Sullivan's Island, South Carolina, U.S.
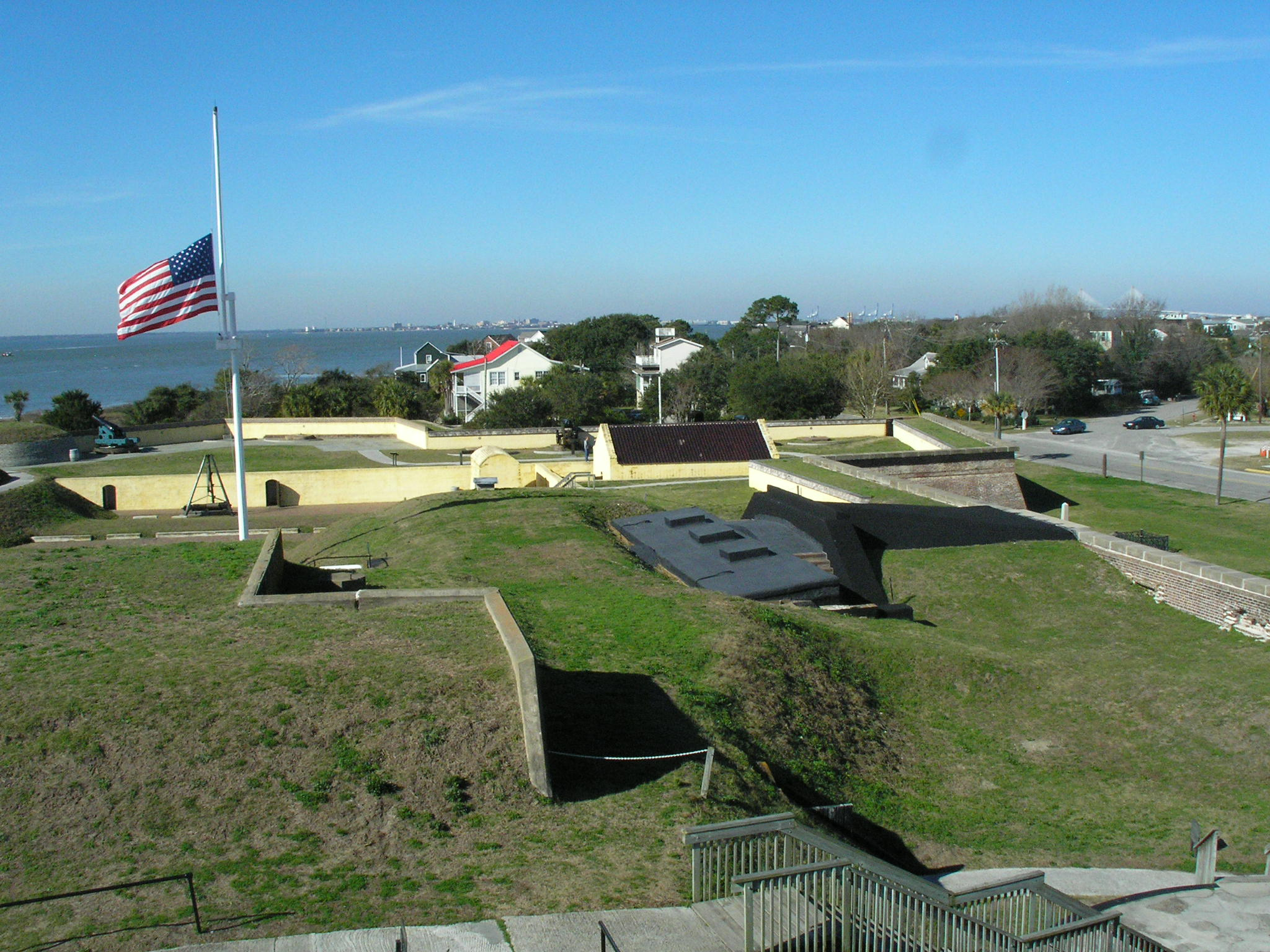
- Fort Moultrie on December 27, 2006. The United States flag was at half-staf because of Gerald Ford's death.

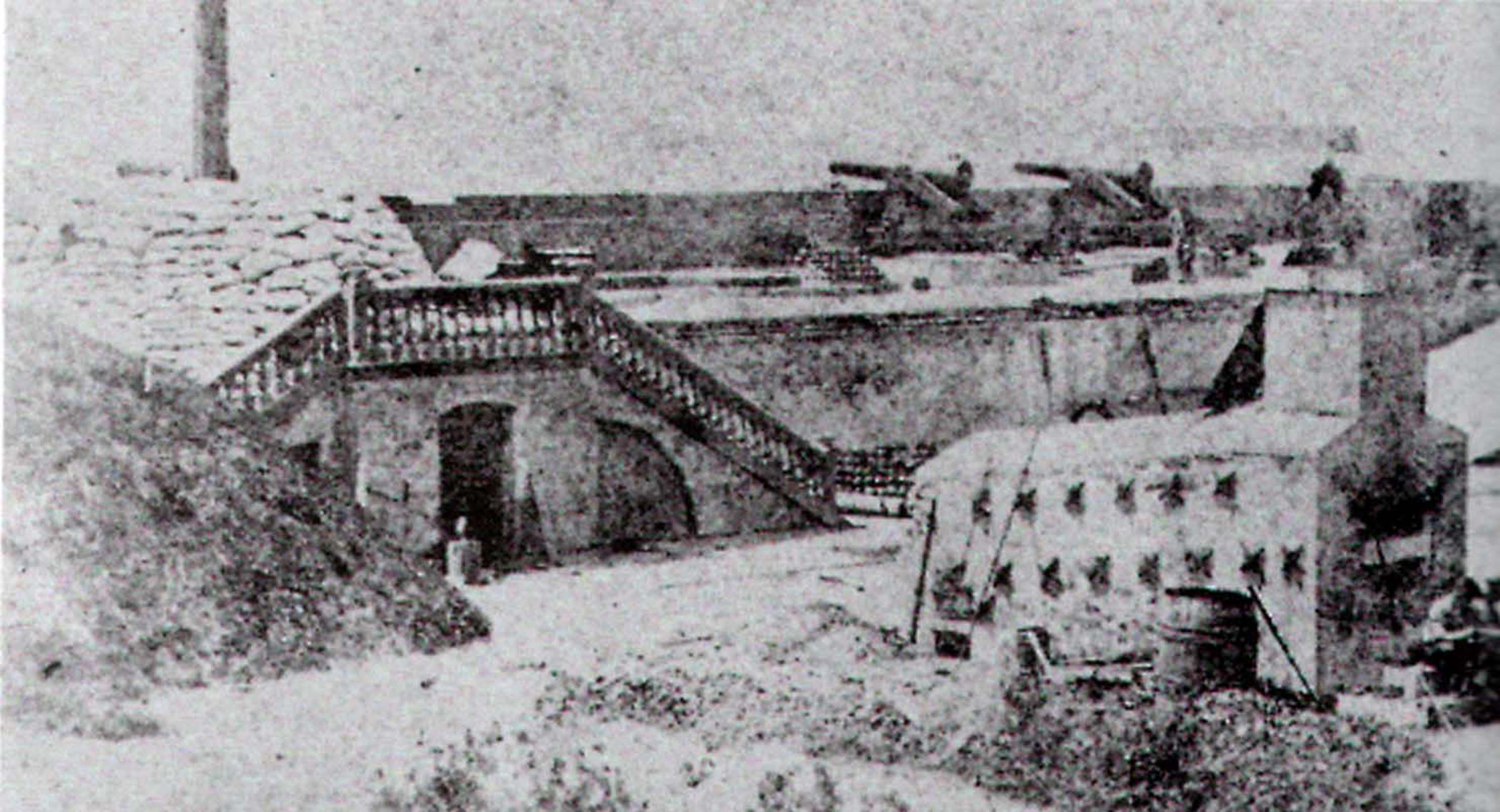
- Fort Moultrie in 1861.

Site information
- Owner: National Park Service
- Open to the public: Yes

Location
- Coordinates: 32°45′33.81″N 79°51′28.05″W

Site history
- Built: 1776
- In use: 1776 - 1994
- Battles/wars: Battle of Sullivan's Island

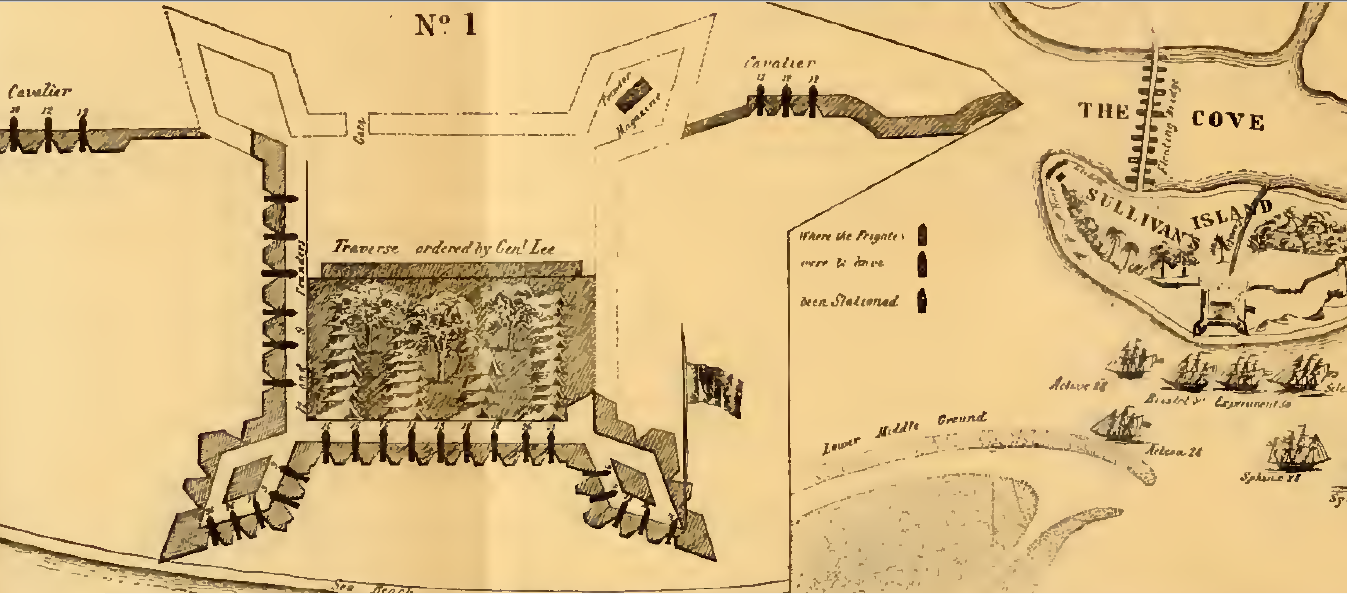
Fort Sullivan on June 28, 1776

The Fort Moultrie flag is used as the flag of Fort Moultrie.

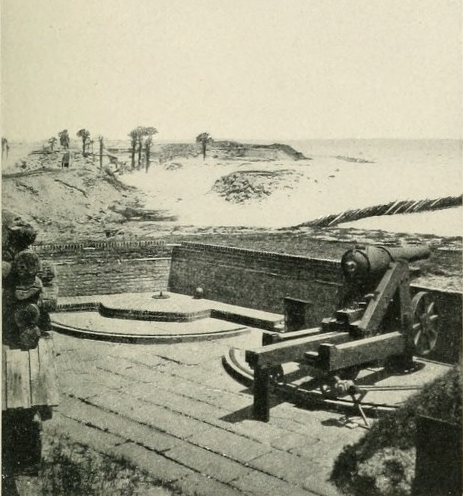
Confederate Fort Moultrie on Sullivan's Island looking east into Charleston Harbor

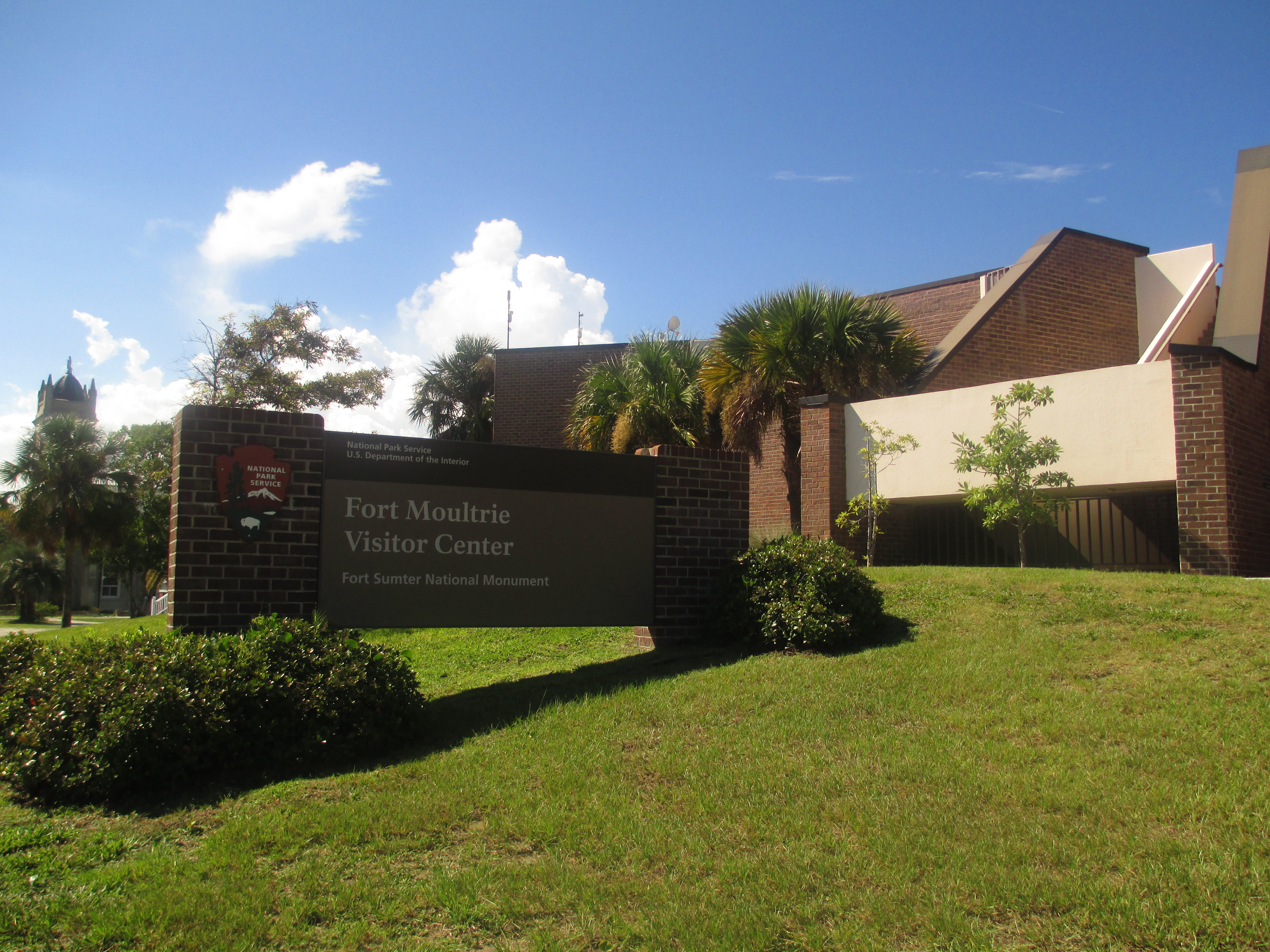
Fort Moultrie Visitor Center

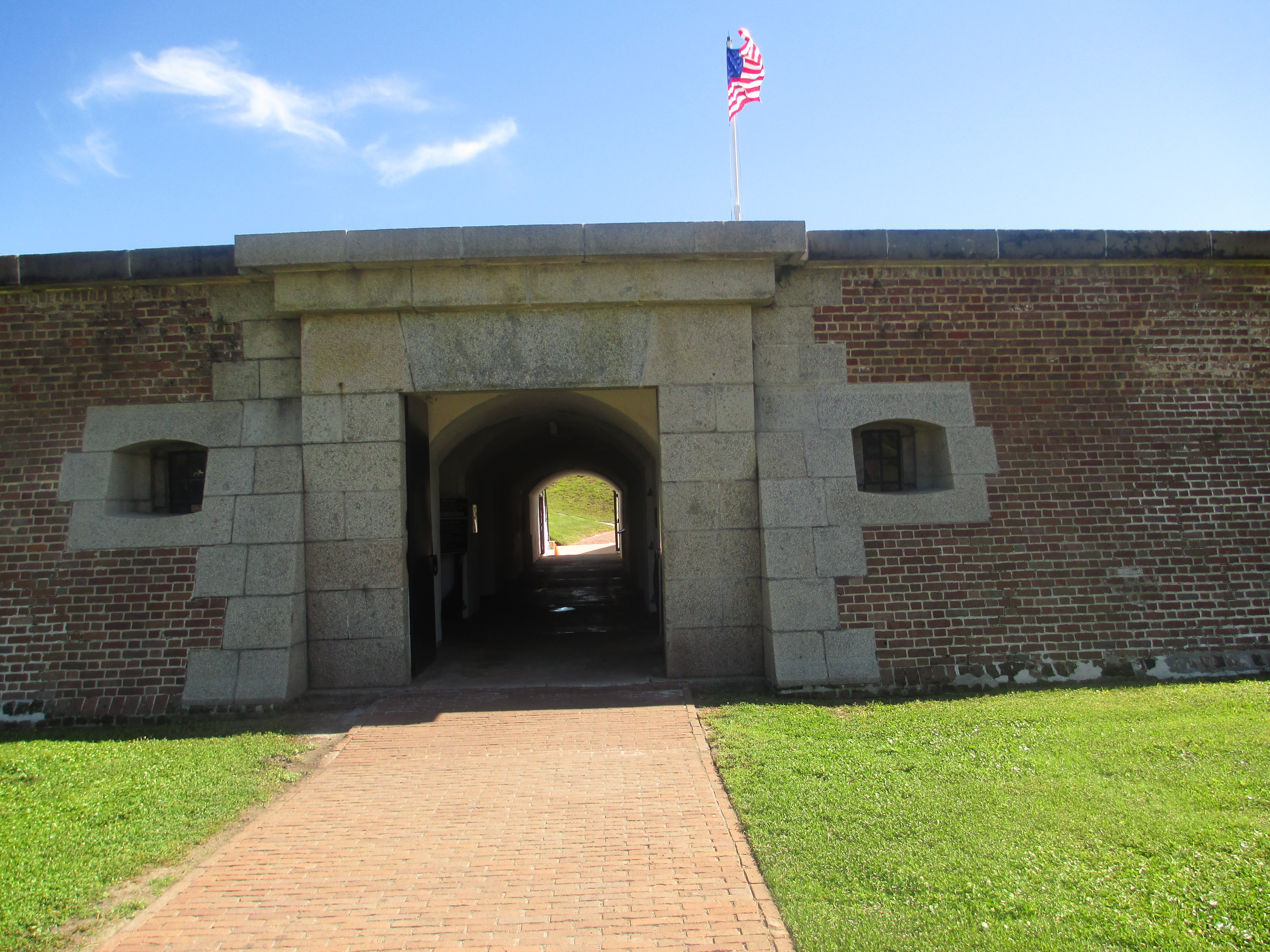
Entrance to Fort Moultrie

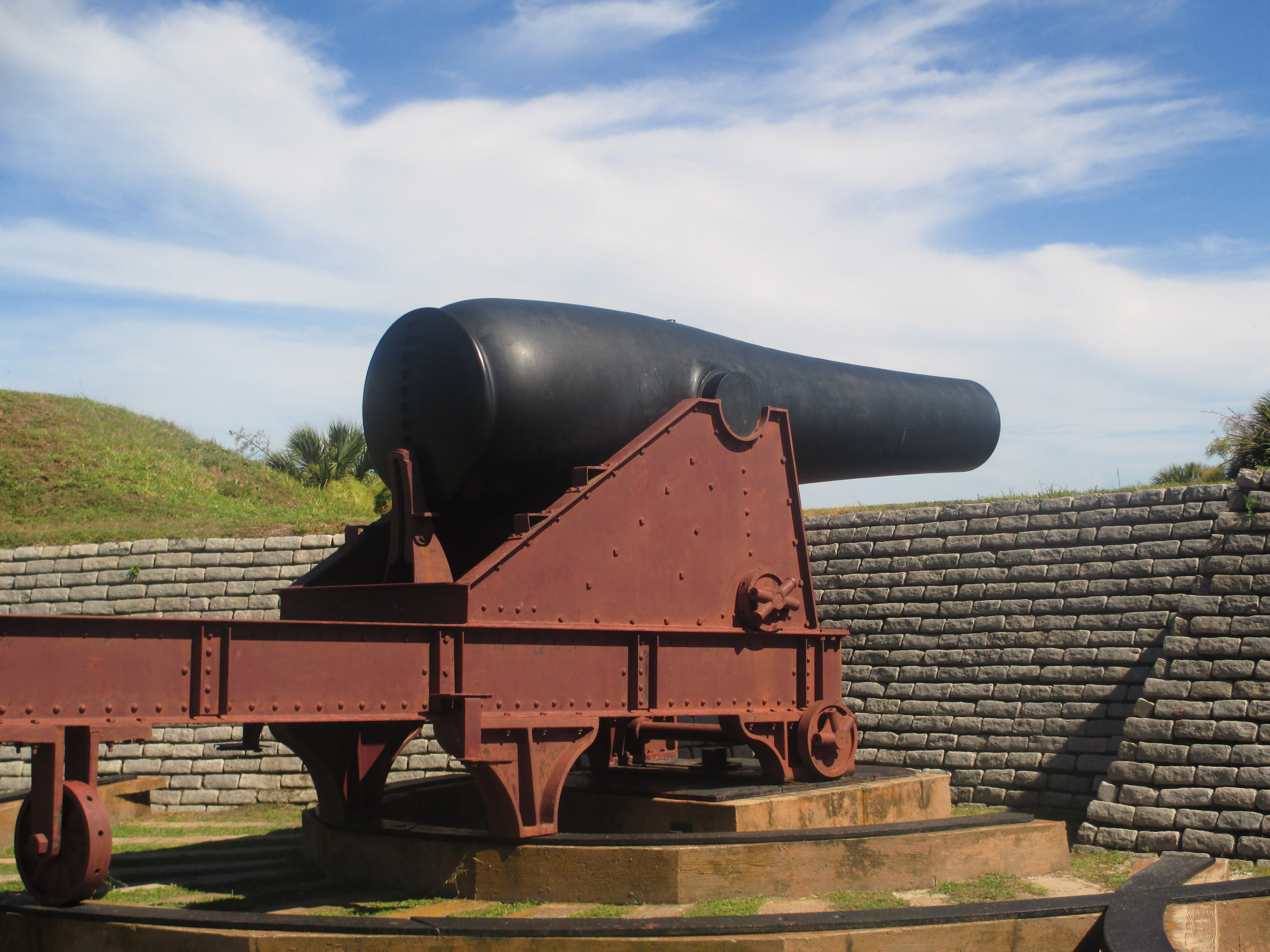
Cannon displayed at Fort Moultrie

Fort Moultrie is a series of fortifications on Sullivan's Island, South Carolina, built to protect the city of Charleston, South Carolina. The first fort, formerly named Fort Sullivan, built of palmetto logs, inspired the flag and nickname of South Carolina, as "The Palmetto State". The fort was renamed for the U.S. patriot commander in the Battle of Sullivan's Island, General William Moultrie. During British occupation, in 1780–1782, the fort was known as Fort Arbuthnot.

== History ==
=== American Revolution ===
Col. Moultrie took command of Sullivan's Island on March 2, 1776, which included a garrison of 413 men of the 2nd South Carolina Regiment of Infantry and 22 men of the 4th South Carolina Regiment, artillery. The island included a fort, still under construction at the southern tip, which was being supervised by Capt. De Brahm. The square design, with corner bastions, was supposed to have parallel rows of palmetto logs 10 feet high (3.0 m), filled in with 16 feet of sand (4.9 m). However, by June 28, only the front (the southeast and southeast curtain walls and bastions) was complete. The northern portion of the fort was unfinished, standing at only 7 ft (2.1 m). Cavaliers were constructed along the rear walls. The blue flag on the southeast bastion had the word "Liberty" on it. A total of 31 guns commanded the approach from Five Fathom Hole offshore, past the island and the Middle Ground shoal, before ships could enter the harbor.

South Carolina patriots began to build a fort to guard Charleston, South Carolina, harbor in 1776. Royal Navy Admiral Sir Peter Parker led a fleet of nine warships in an attack against the fort—known as Fort Sullivan and incomplete—on June 28, 1776, near the beginning of the American Revolutionary War. The soft palmetto logs did not crack under bombardment but rather absorbed the shot; cannonballs reportedly even bounced off the walls of the structure. William Moultrie, commander of the 2nd South Carolina Regiment, and his four hundred men fought a day-long battle that ended with Parker's heavily damaged fleet being driven from the area. The fort hence took its name, as Fort Moultrie, in his honor. Charleston locals celebrate "Carolina Day" to commemorate the bravery of the defenders of the fort.

During this battle, Moultrie flew a flag of his own design, authorized by the colonial government. It was later called the Moultrie flag, or Liberty flag, and became iconic to the Revolution in the South.

The British eventually captured Fort Moultrie, as part of the Siege of Charleston in spring 1780, and renamed it as Fort Arbuthnot. Nevertheless, the Patriots won the war, and British troops departed in 1782, at which time the flag was presented in Charleston, by General Nathanael Greene, commander of the southern Regulars.

=== Early federal period ===
The outbreak of the French Revolutionary Wars heightened American tensions with Europe. US authorities proceeded to embark on a significant fortification program for important harbors, later called the first system of fortifications. Atop the decayed original Fort Moultrie, the Army completed a new fort in 1798; the Army also built nineteen other new forts along the Atlantic coast. The fort was garrisoned by Captain Jonathan Robeson's company of the Regiment of Artillerists in 1802. However, after years of neglect, the Antigua–Charleston hurricane destroyed Fort Moultrie in 1804.

Fort Moultrie was rebuilt as part of the Second System of fortifications in 1808–09, under the direction of Army engineer Alexander Macomb. A report by the Secretary of War, on fortifications in December 1811, describes Fort Moultrie as:

"an irregular form, built of brick, presenting a battery of three sides on the sea front, and the whole is enclosed with ramparts, parapets, &c. mounting 40 guns. … The barracks are of brick … for five hundred (soldiers)".

Fort Moultrie's main design did not change much over the next five decades. The Army altered the parapet and modernized the armament, but defense of Charleston centered increasingly around newly created Fort Sumter. By the time of the American Civil War, Fort Moultrie, Fort Sumter, Fort Johnson, and Castle Pinckney surrounded and defended Charleston.

Fort Moultrie began to record meteorological observations in the early 1820s.

For fifty years the Army detained Native American prisoners at Fort Moultrie. Seminole Indian fighter Osceola and some fellow Seminoles were captured in late 1837 and transferred to the fort. Osceola died of malaria in January 1838; the Army buried his corpse at the front gate of Fort Moultrie and thereafter maintained his grave.

=== Civil War ===
In the months leading up to the Civil War, John L. Gardner was in command at Fort Moultrie. With secession growing more imminent, Gardner had made several requests to Secretary of War John B. Floyd for more troops to garrison and defend the undermanned fortress. Each time his requests were ignored, as Floyd, who joined the Confederacy, was planning to hand the forts in Charleston Harbor over to the secessionists.

South Carolina seceded from the Union on December 20, 1860, after the first election of President Abraham Lincoln. Around this time a Federal garrison from the 1st US Artillery was sent to Fort Moultrie. Unlike the state militia at the other forts, the U.S. Regular Army defenders of Fort Moultrie chose not to surrender to the South Carolina forces. On December 26, 1860, Union Major Robert Anderson moved his garrison from Fort Moultrie to the stronger Fort Sumter. On February 8, 1861, South Carolina joined the five other seceded Deep Southern states to form the Confederate States of America. In April 1861, Confederate troops shelled Fort Sumter into submission, and the American Civil War began.

In April 1863, Federal ironclads and shore batteries began a bombardment of Fort Moultrie and the other forts around Charleston harbor. Over the ensuing twenty months, Union bombardment reduced Fort Sumter to a rubble pile and pounded Fort Moultrie below a sand hill, which protected it against further bombardment. The rifled cannon proved its superiority to brickwork fortifications but not to the endurance of the Confederate artillerymen who continued to man Fort Moultrie. In February 1865, as General Sherman marched through South Carolina, the Confederate soldiers finally abandoned the rubble of Fort Moultrie and evacuated the city of Charleston.

=== Postbellum period and 20th century ===
The U.S. Army modernized Fort Moultrie in the 1870s with new weapons and deep concrete bunkers. Weapons of this period included 15-inch and 10-inch Rodman guns (380 and 250 mm), which were smoothbores, and 8-inch converted rifles, lined down from 10-inch Rodmans.

Beginning in 1897, Fort Moultrie's armament was modernized under the large-scale Endicott Program of coast defenses. Eight new reinforced-concrete batteries were completed by 1906, and part of the Second System fort was demolished to make room for batteries Bingham, McCorkle, and Lord. The fort also had a mine casemate to control a naval minefield. In 1901 Coast Artillery units were designated from heavy artillery units, and in 1907 the United States Army Coast Artillery Corps was formed to garrison the new coast defenses.

The Endicott Program batteries at Fort Moultrie were:

Name	No. of guns	Gun type	Carriage type	Years active
Capron-Butler	16	12-inch mortar M1886	barbette M1891	1898–1942
Jasper	4	10-inch gun M1888	disappearing M1896	1898–1942
Thomson	2	10-inch gun M1900	disappearing M1901	1906–1945
Gadsden	4	6-inch gun M1903	disappearing M1903	1906–1917
Logan	1	6-inch Armstrong gun	pedestal	1899–1904
Logan	1	6-inch gun M1897	disappearing M1898	1899–1944
Bingham	2	4.72-inch 45 caliber Armstrong gun	pedestal	1899–1919
McCorkle	3	3-inch gun M1898	masking parapet M1898	1901–1920
Lord	2	3-inch M1902 seacoast gun	pedestal M1902	1905–1946

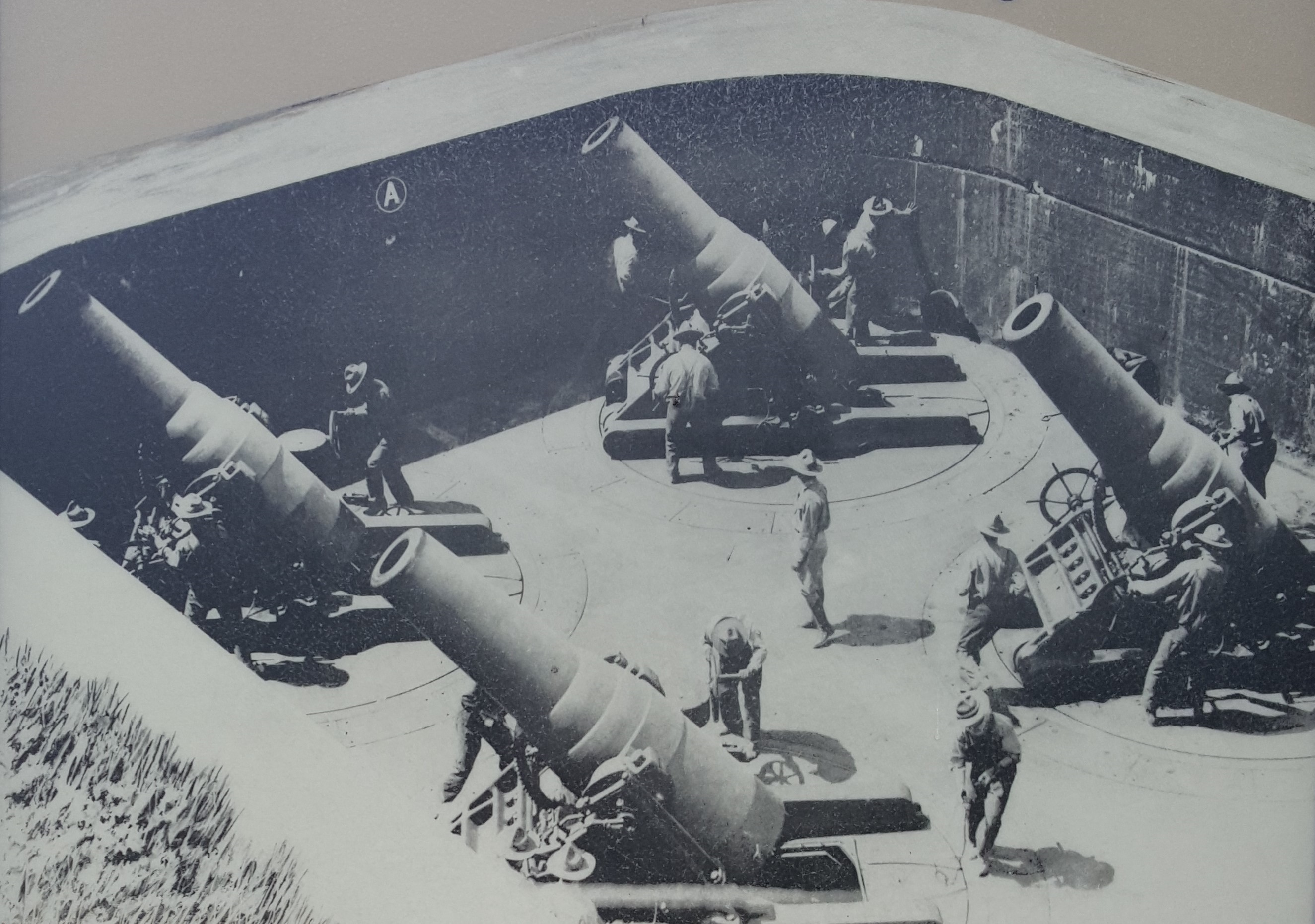
12-inch mortars in a pit; Battery Capron had four pits of this type

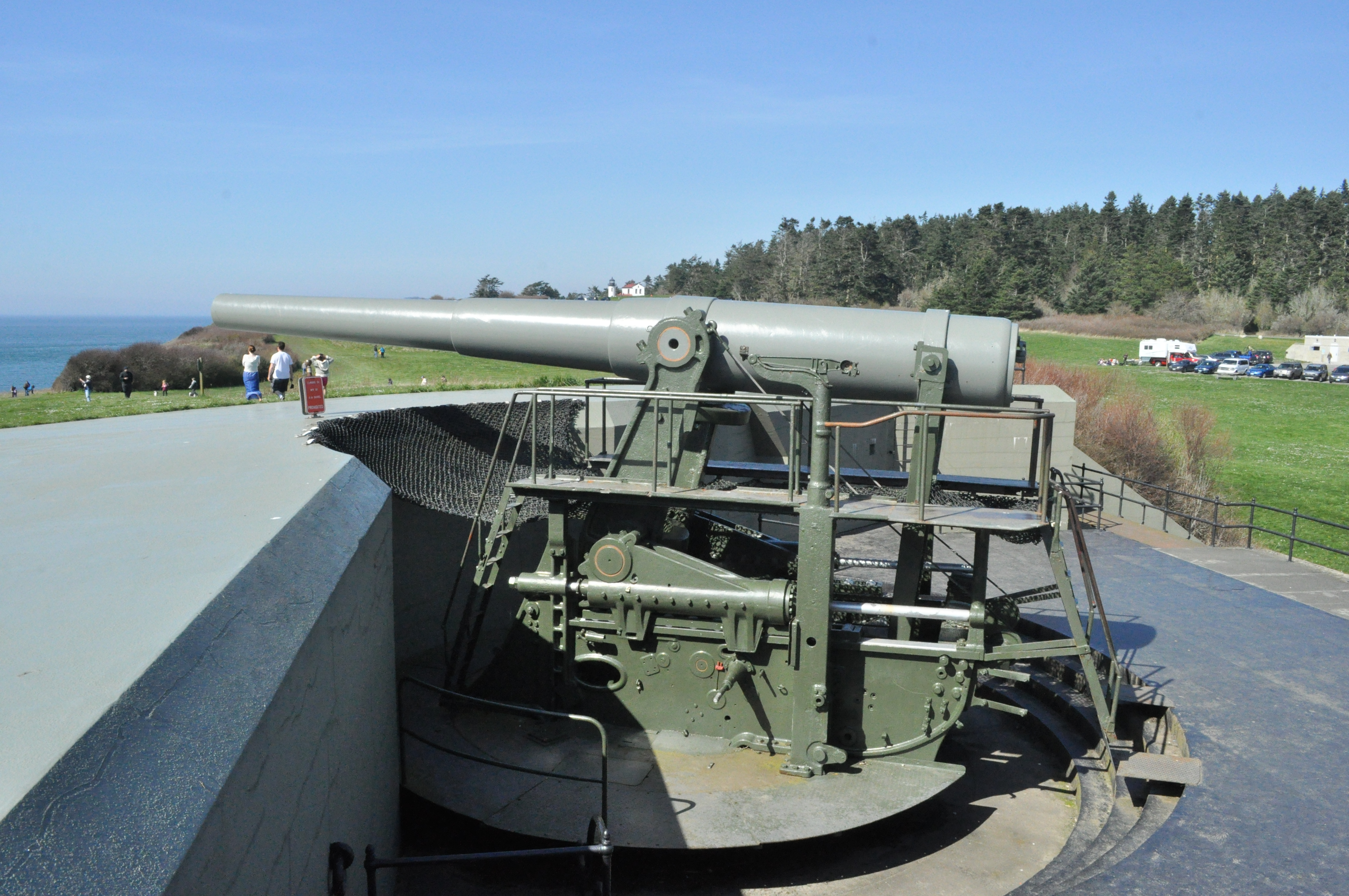
10-inch disappearing gun at Fort Casey, Washington state, similar to those at Fort Moultrie.

Battery Capron, with sixteen 12-inch mortars, was the largest component of the new defenses. In 1906 it was organizationally split into two batteries, Capron and Butler, each with eight mortars. Batteries Jasper and Thomson provided longer-range weapons with a total of six 10-inch disappearing guns. In April 1898 the Spanish–American War broke out, with Fort Moultrie's smaller, rapid-fire batteries still years from completion. Batteries Logan and Bingham were added to the fort, mostly equipped with weapons purchased from the United Kingdom. In 1901 Battery McCorkle was added to defend the minefield against minesweepers with three 3-inch guns on retractable masking parapet carriages. In 1905 Battery Lord was added with two 3-inch guns, and in 1906 Battery Gadsden provided four 6-inch rapid-fire disappearing guns.

These batteries were supplemented in 1899 by a pair of 12-inch guns at Fort Sumter. Forts Moultrie and Sumter constituted the Coast Defenses of Charleston, as the Charleston Coast Artillery District was designated in 1913.

Battery Capron was named for Captain Allyn K. Capron of the 1st US Volunteer Cavalry, the famous "Rough Riders", who was the first US Army officer killed in the Spanish–American War. Battery Butler was named for Colonel Pierce M. Butler of the Palmetto Regiment, killed in the Battle of Churubusco in the 1847 Mexican–American War. Battery Jasper was named for Sergeant William Jasper of the 2nd South Carolina Regiment, a hero of the 1776 attack on the fort. Battery Thomson was named for Colonel William Thomson of the 3rd South Carolina Regiment, commended for defending Charleston in June 1776. Battery Gadsden was named for Brigadier General Christopher Gadsden, a South Carolina officer of the Revolutionary War. Battery Logan was named for Captain William Logan, killed fighting the Nez Perce in 1877. Battery Bingham was named for 2nd Lieutenant Horatio Bingham, killed fighting the Sioux in 1866. Battery McCorkle was named for 1st Lieutenant Henry McCorkle of the 25th US Infantry Regiment, killed in the Battle of El Caney in the Spanish–American War. Battery Lord was named for Assistant Surgeon George Edwin Lord, killed at the Battle of the Little Big Horn, also called "Custer's Last Stand", in 1876.

In 1904 Battery Logan's 6-inch Armstrong gun was removed and most likely transferred to Fort Adams.

After the US entered World War I, Battery Gadsden's four 6-inch guns were removed for service on field carriages on the Western Front in 1917 and were never returned to the fort. Records show the guns arrived in France, but a history of the Coast Artillery in World War I states that none of the regiments in France equipped with 6-inch guns completed training in time to see action before the Armistice.

Two of Battery Jasper's four 10-inch guns were similarly removed in 1918 for potential use as railway guns; they were never returned to the fort but were replaced with guns from Fort Washington in 1919.

Following World War I there were several changes at Fort Moultrie as part of a forcewide partial disarmament of the coast defense system. Battery Bingham's two 4.7-inch Armstrong guns and Battery McCorkle's three 3-inch M1898 guns were removed in 1919–20 as part of a general removal from service of some gun types. Eight of Battery Capron-Butler's mortars were removed and the remaining eight replaced with M1890 mortars on M1896 carriages in 1920. The removal of half the mortars was a forcewide measure to increase the rate of fire by reducing overcrowding of mortar pits during reloading.

With the outbreak of World War II in 1939 and the Fall of France in 1940, a comprehensive upgrade of US coastal fortifications was implemented. In the early part of the war the Harbor Defenses of Charleston were garrisoned by the 13th Coast Artillery Regiment of the Regular Army and the 263rd Coast Artillery Regiment of the South Carolina National Guard. The Marshall Military Reservation, a sub-post of Fort Moultrie, was established in the northeast part of Sullivan's Island to accommodate the new batteries. The batteries built during World War II at and near Fort Moultrie were:

- BCN = Battery Construction Number
- AMTB = Anti-Motor Torpedo Boat Battery

Name	No. of guns	Gun type	Carriage type	Years active
BCN 520	2	12-inch gun M1895	long-range barbette M1917	1944–1947
BCN 230	2	6-inch gun M1	shielded barbette M4	Not armed
unnamed	4	155 mm gun M1918	towed with Panama mounts	1941–1945
AMTB 2A	4	90 mm gun	two fixed T2/M1, two towed	1943–1946

Additionally, a battery of two 16-inch guns designated BCN 125 was proposed for James Island, south of Charleston Harbor, but was never built.

The unnamed battery of four 155 mm M1918 towed guns on concrete Panama mounts was established in 1941 to quickly augment Charleston's harbor defenses.

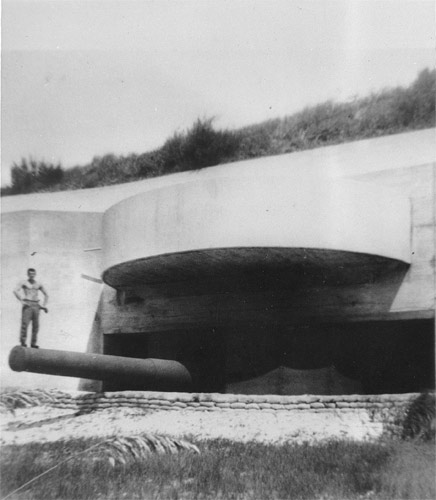
12-inch casemated gun, similar to those of BCN 520

The construction of the long-range BCN 520 with 12-inch guns rendered all previous gun defenses in the Charleston area obsolete. BCN 520 was armed with guns removed from Battery Kimble at Fort Travis, Galveston, Texas. Almost all of Fort Moultrie's previous armament was scrapped in 1942, except Battery Thomson's pair of 10-inch guns and Battery Lord's pair of 3-inch guns. The two fixed emplacements of AMTB 2A were built on the former 10-inch Battery Jasper. A Harbor Entrance Control Post (HECP) to coordinate Army and Navy harbor defenses was established at the old fort and has been refurbished as an exhibit.

On August 15, 1947, the Army lowered Fort Moultrie's flag for the last time and ended 171 years of service. After the war, due to changes in military technology, including submarines and nuclear weapons, seacoast defense of the United States ceased to be a viable strategy.

== Decommissioning ==
- Fort Moultrie Quartermaster and Support Facilities Historic District
- U.S. National Register of Historic Places
- U.S. Historic district
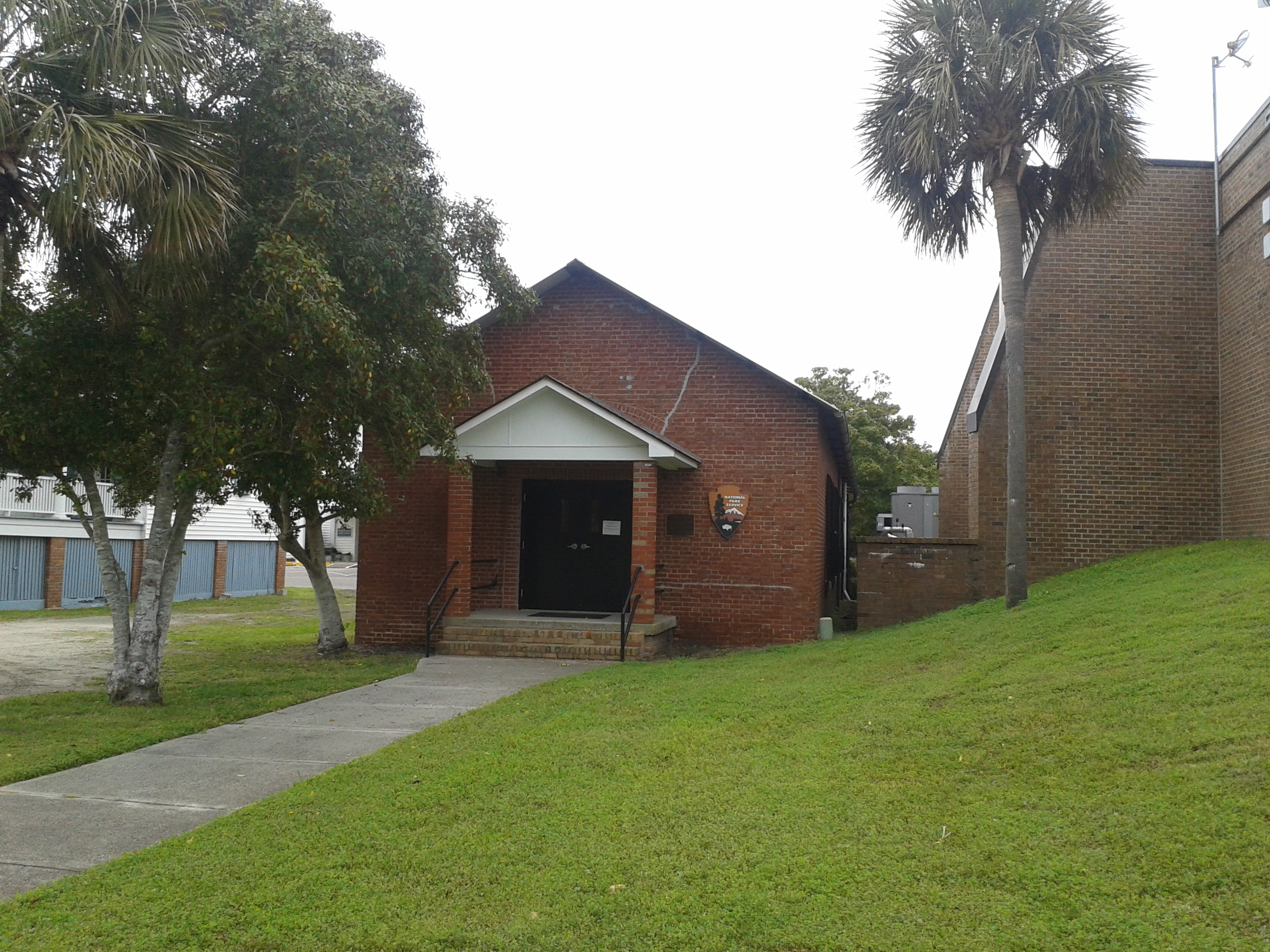
- The former torpedo (naval mine) storage building at Fort Moultrie; today it serves as office space for the park.

- Location within South Carolina Location within the United States
- Location: Middle St. and Thompson Ave., bet. Stations 14 and 16.5, Sullivan's Island, South Carolina
- Area: 5.3 acres (2.1 ha)
- MPS: Sullivan's Island, South Island MPS
- NRHP reference No.: 07000925
- Added to NRHP: September 6, 2007

In 1960, the Department of Defense transferred Fort Moultrie to the National Park Service. NPS manages the historic fort as a unit of Fort Sumter and Fort Moultrie National Historical Park. NPS has interpreted the fort as a tour backward in time from its defenses from World War II to the original palmetto log fort constructed by William Moultrie. The preserved Harbor Entrance Control Post and BCN 520 (now a private residence) are the main relics of the World War II era.

The National Register of Historic Places listed Fort Moultrie Quartermaster and Support Facilities Historic District on September 6, 2007. In 2016, the America the Beautiful quarter for South Carolina featured Fort Moultrie.

In 1999, the construction of a 38-foot (12 m) tall private home next to the fort that blocked the sightline to Fort Sumter led to a successful campaign to eliminate the problem. The American Battlefield Trust, then known as the Civil War Preservation Trust, was assisted by the National Park Service, the Trust for Public Land, and a consortium of local residents in buying the 0.23-acre (930 m^{2}) plot from the landowner and removing the building.

Moultrie is honored with his statue in The Battery section of downtown Charleston.

== See also ==
- 13th Coast Artillery (United States)

== Bibliography ==
- Berhow, Mark A., ed. (2015). American Seacoast Defenses, A Reference Guide (Third ed.). McLean, Virginia: CDSG Press. ISBN 978-0-9748167-3-9.
- Detzer, David (2002). Allegiance: Fort Sumter, Charleston, and the Beginning of the Civil War.
  Houghton Mifflin Harcourt. p. 400. ISBN 9780156007412., Book (par view)
- Doubleday, Abner (1998). Reminiscences of Forts Sumter and Moultrie in 1860–61. Charleston, SC: Nautical & Aviation Publishing Company. ISBN 1-877853-40-2.
- Lewis, Emanuel Raymond (1979). Seacoast Fortifications of the United States. Annapolis: Leeward Publications. ISBN 978-0-929521-11-4.
- Lossing, Benson John (1874). The Pictorial Field Book of the Civil War in the United States of America, Volume 1.
  Hartford: Thomas Belknap. p. 640., E'book
- Moore, Frank (1889). The Civil War in Song and Story, 1860–1865.
  New York: P. F. Collier. p. 560., E'book
- Rinaldi, Richard A. (2004). The U. S. Army in World War I: Orders of Battle. General Data LLC. ISBN 0-9720296-4-8.
- Wade, Arthur P. (2011). Artillerists and Engineers: The Beginnings of American Seacoast Fortifications, 1794–1815. McLean, Virginia: CDSG Press. ISBN 978-0-9748167-2-2.
- Wilson, James Grant; Fiske, John (1888). Appletons' Cyclopaedia of American Biography, Volume 2.
  D. Appleton and Company, New York., E'book
