= Sullivan's Island, South Carolina =

- Town
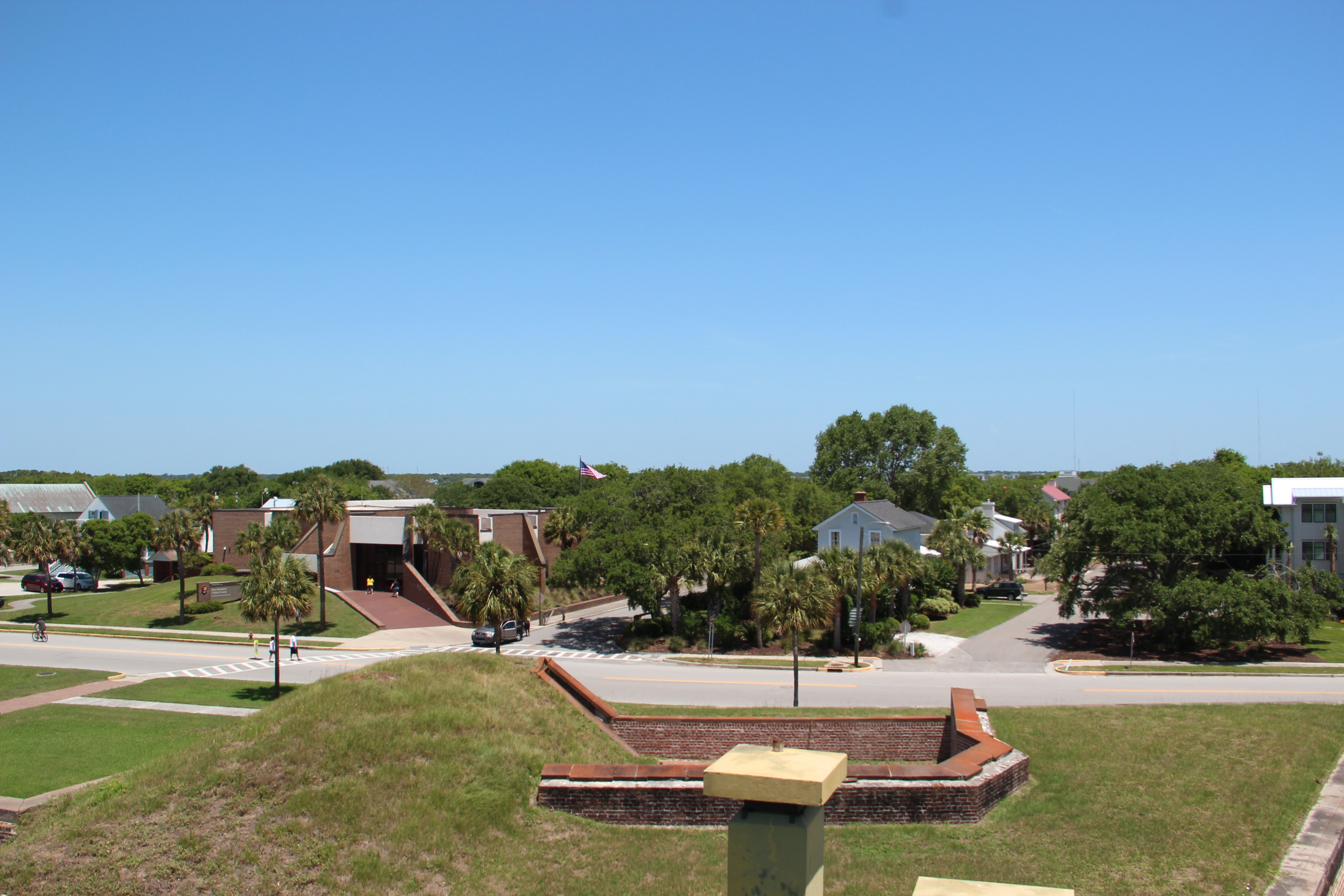
- Sullivan's Island viewed from Fort Moultrie
- Interactive map of Sullivan's Island, South Carolina
- Coordinates: 32°46′05″N 79°50′11″W
- Country: United States
- State: South Carolina
- County: Charleston
- Settled: 17th century (as O'Sullivan's Island)
- Named for: Captain Florence O'Sullivan

Area
  - Total: 3.44 sq mi (8.91 km^{2})
  - Land: 2.50 sq mi (6.47 km^{2})
  - Water: 0.94 sq mi (2.44 km^{2})
- Elevation: 0 ft (0 m)

Population (2020)
  - Total: 1,891
  - Density: 757.0/sq mi (292.28/km^{2})
- Time zone: UTC−5 (EST)
  - Summer (DST): UTC−4 (EDT)
- ZIP code: 29482
- Area codes: 843, 854
- FIPS code: 45-70090
- GNIS feature ID: 2406679
- Website: sullivansisland.sc.gov

Sullivan's Island, historically known as O'Sullivan's Island, is a town and island in Charleston County, South Carolina, United States, at the entrance to Charleston Harbor, with a population of 1,791 at the 2010 census, and 1,891 people in 2020. The town is part of the Charleston metropolitan area and is considered a very affluent suburb of Charleston.

== History ==
Sullivan's Island was the point of entry for approximately 40 to 50 percent of the 400,000 enslaved Africans brought to Colonial America, . It has been likened to Ellis Island, the 19th-century reception point for immigrants in New York City.

=== Battle of Sullivan Island ===
During the American Revolution, the island was the site of a major battle at Fort Sullivan on June 28, 1776.

Captain Francis "The Swamp Fox" Marion was a notable figure at the famous Battle of Sullivan Island in which approximately 800 South Carolinians successfully repelled a Royal Navy fleet consisting of several naval frigates and an estimated 2,500 British soldiers.

While defending the island, the artillery battalion commanded by Captain Francis Marion ran out of black powder. Captain Francis Marion assembled a small team of men, traveled to Charleston and "procured" more black powder for his troops still defending the island. His actions held momentum for the outnumbered American forces, and forced a retreat after several shells sank a British frigate.

Captain Marion also directed his troops to utilize the local palmetto trees to build fortifications. According to reports, the spongy nature of the palmetto tree wood mitigated british cannon fire, with the cannon balls "sinking" into the wood instead of exploding and creating shrapnel.

It has since been renamed Fort Moultrie in honor of the American commander at the battle.

=== Hurricane Hugo ===
On September 23, 1989, Hurricane Hugo came ashore near Sullivan's Island; few people were prepared for the destruction that followed in its wake. The eye of the hurricane passed directly over Sullivan's Island. The Ben Sawyer Bridge was a casualty, breaking free of its locks. Before the storm was over, one end of the bridge was in the water and the other was pointing skyward. Sullivan's Island police chief, Jack Lilien, was the last person to leave the island before the bridge gave way.

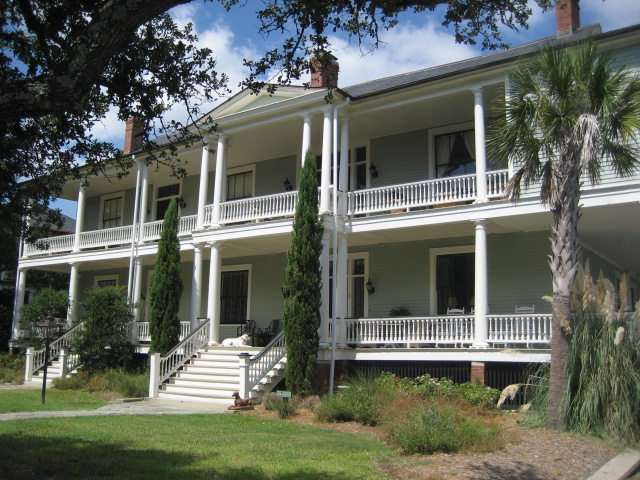
Circa 1900 building on Sullivan's Island, renovated for use as condominiums

The island was known as O'Sullivan's Island, named for Captain Florence O'Sullivan, who was stationed here as a lookout in the late 17th century. O'Sullivan was captain of one of the ships in the first fleet to establish the colonial settlement of Charles Town. In 1671, he became surveyor general. He appears in the earliest record of Irish immigration to the Carolinas, mentioned as being taken on "at Kingsayle (Kinsale) in Ireland".

Sullivan's Island was used as a quarantine station for enslaved Africans, who were housed in various "pest houses" on the island and checked for communicable diseases before they were transported to Charleston for sale at public auction. Sullivan's Island was the port of entry for over 40% of the estimated 400,000 enslaved Africans transported to Colonial America, making it the largest slave port in North America. It is estimated that more than half of, if not all, African Americans have ancestors who passed through Sullivan's Island.

"There is no suitable memorial, or plaque, or wreath or wall, or park or skyscraper lobby," writer Toni Morrison said in 1989. "There's no 300-foot tower, there's no small bench by the road."

On July 26, 2008, the Toni Morrison Society dedicated a small, black, steel bench on Sullivan's Island to the memory of the Africans forced into slavery, one of several which are planned. The memorial was privately funded.

In 2009, the National Park Service installed a commemorative marker at Fort Moultrie describing the Sullivan's Island Quarantine Station. The text on the plaque reads:

This is Sullivan's Island

A place where...Africans were brought to this country under extreme conditions of human bondage and degradation. Tens of thousands of captives arrived on Sullivan's Island from the West African shores between 1700 and 1775. Those who remained in the Charleston community and those who passed through this site account for a significant number of the African-Americans now residing in these United States. Only through God's blessings, a burning desire for justice, and persistent will to succeed against monumental odds, have African-Americans created a place for themselves in the American mosaic.

A place where...We commemorate this site as the entry of Africans who came and who contributed to the greatness of our country. The Africans who entered through this port have moved on to meet the challenges created by injustices, racial and economic discrimination, and withheld opportunities. Africans and African-Americans, through the sweat of their brow, have distinguished themselves in the Arts, Education, Medicine, Politics, Religion, Law, Athletics, Research, Artisans and Trades, Business, Industry, Economics, Science, Technology and Community and Social Services.

A place where...This memorial rekindles the memory of a dismal time in American history, but it also serves as a reminder for a people who – past and present, have retained the unique values, strength and potential that flow from our West African culture which came to this nation through the middle passage.

Erected in 1990 by the S.C. Department of Archives and History. The Charleston Club of S.C. and the Avery Research Center.

Pursuant to a request from the South Carolina General Assembly as Evidenced in concurrent resolution S. 719, Adopted June 3, 1990.

Albert Wheeler Todd, an architect from Charleston, designed a town hall for the island. For most of its history, the town, located on the southwest half of the island, was known as "Moultrieville". Later, Atlanticville, a community on the north-east of the islands, merged with Moultrieville and together the two became the town of Sullivan's Island. In 1962, the new Charleston Light was built.

In May 2006, the Town of Sullivan's Island became the first municipality in South Carolina to ban smoking in all public places. The ordinance passed 4–2 and the ban went into effect in June.

The Atlanticville Historic District, Battery Gadsden, Battery Thomson, Fort Moultrie Quartermaster and Support Facilities Historic District, Moultrieville Historic District, Dr. John B. Patrick House, Sullivan's Island Historic District, and U.S. Coast Guard Historic District are listed on the National Register of Historic Places.

=== Fort Moultrie ===
The Battle of Sullivan's Island

On June 28, 1776, an incomplete fort was held by South Carolinian forces under Colonel William Moultrie against an invasion by a British force under the command of Henry Clinton sailing with Commodore Sir Peter Parker's Royal Navy fleet. The British cannonade proved to have no effect on the sand-filled palmetto log walls of the fort; the only fatalities were the result of those shots that carried over the walls.

During this battle, a flag designed by Moultrie flew over the fortress; it was dark blue with a crescent moon on it bearing the word "liberty". When this flag was shot down, Sergeant William Jasper reportedly picked it up and held it aloft, rallying the troops until a new standard could be provided. Because of the importance of this pivotal battle, that flag became symbolic of liberty in South Carolina, the South, and the nation as a whole.

The Battle of Sullivan's Island was commemorated by the addition of a white palmetto tree to the flag used to rally that day, known as the Moultrie Flag. This was used as the basis of the state flag of South Carolina. The victory is celebrated and June 28 is known as Carolina Day.

The history of the island has been dominated by Fort Moultrie, which, until its closure in the late 1940s, served as the base of command for the defense of Charleston. After World War II, the Department of Defense concluded that such coastal defense installations were no longer needed, given current technology and style of war. It is now used as heritage tourism.

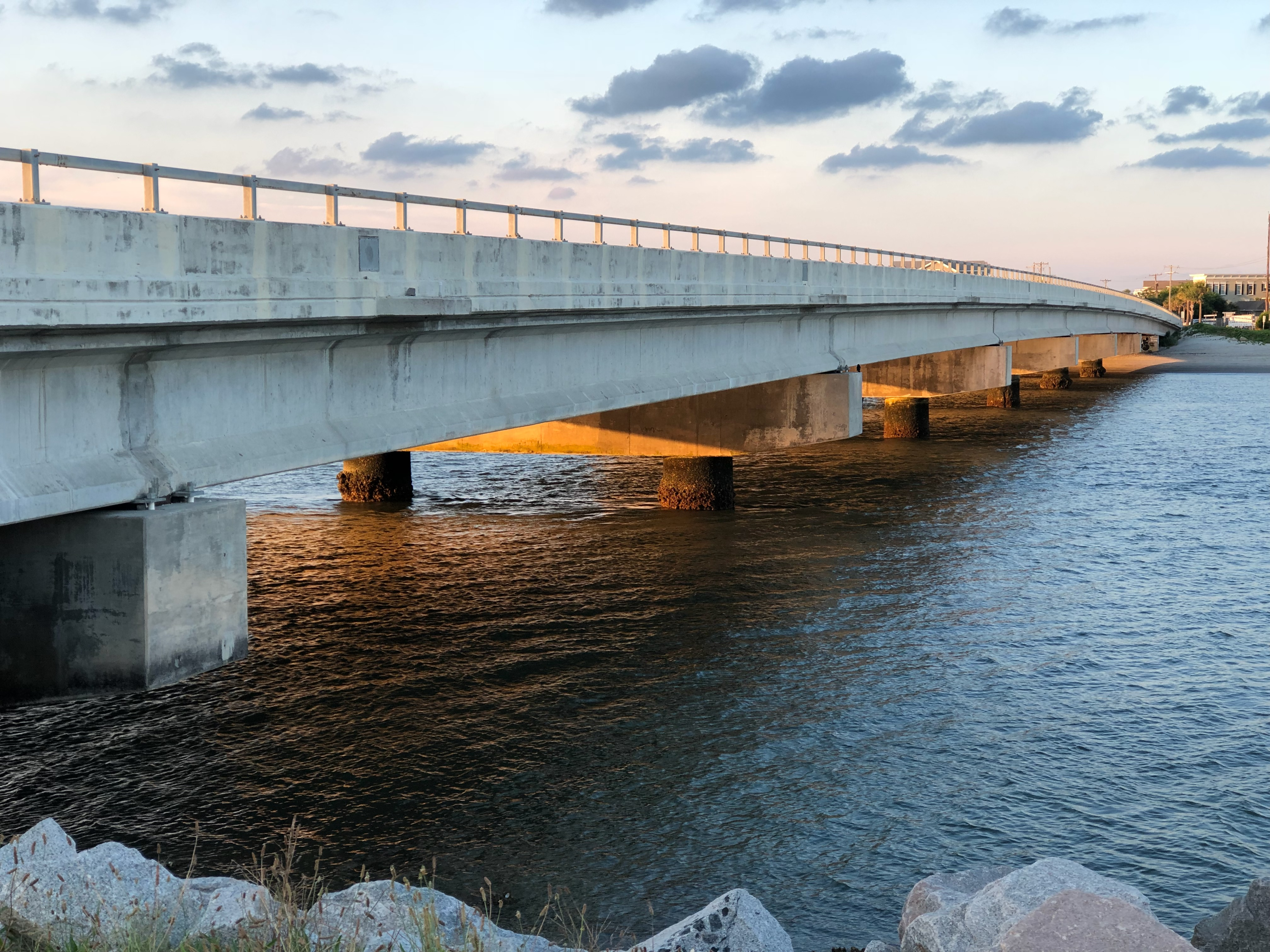
Breach Inlet between Sullivan's Island and Isle of Palms

== Geography ==
Sullivan's Island is located along the Atlantic Ocean near the center of Charleston County. The town is bordered to the west by the entrance to Charleston Harbor, to the north by Cove Inlet and the Intracoastal Waterway, and to the east by Breach Inlet and Swinton Creek. The Ben Sawyer Bridge connects Sullivan's Island to Mount Pleasant to the north. A bridge spanning Breach Inlet connects it to Isle of Palms to the east. By road it is 9 miles (14 km) north and then west into Charleston.

According to the U.S. Census Bureau, the town of Sullivan's Island has a total area of 3.4 square miles (8.9 km^{2}), of which 2.5 square miles (6.5 km^{2}) is land and 0.93 square miles (2.4 km^{2}), or 27.36%, is water.

=== Nature trail ===
Traversing across the maritime forest and grasslands, there is a nature trail with a diverse wildlife habitat. Birdwatching is common. Seabirds and shorebirds can be seen there, including sanderlings, terns, willets and loons.

=== Climate ===
According to the Köppen Climate Classification system, Sullivan's Island has a humid subtropical climate, abbreviated "Cfa" on climate maps. The hottest temperature recorded in Sullivan's Island was 105 °F (40.6 °C) on June 26, 1952, while the coldest temperature recorded was 9 °F (−12.8 °C) on January 21, 1985.

Climate data for Sullivan's Island, South Carolina, 1991–2020 normals, extremes 1951–present
Month	Jan	Feb	Mar	Apr	May	Jun	Jul	Aug	Sep	Oct	Nov	Dec	Year
Record high °F (°C)	78 (26)	83 (28)	90 (32)	93 (34)	99 (37)	105 (41)	101 (38)	103 (39)	99 (37)	94 (34)	89 (32)	84 (29)	105 (41)
Mean maximum °F (°C)	72.3 (22.4)	74.3 (23.5)	79.8 (26.6)	85.0 (29.4)	91.1 (32.8)	95.5 (35.3)	97.8 (36.6)	95.9 (35.5)	92.8 (33.8)	87.8 (31.0)	81.0 (27.2)	74.3 (23.5)	98.7 (37.1)
Mean daily maximum °F (°C)	59.2 (15.1)	61.4 (16.3)	67.1 (19.5)	74.8 (23.8)	82.2 (27.9)	87.9 (31.1)	91.1 (32.8)	90.0 (32.2)	85.9 (29.9)	78.3 (25.7)	69.2 (20.7)	62.1 (16.7)	75.8 (24.3)
Daily mean °F (°C)	47.8 (8.8)	50.2 (10.1)	55.9 (13.3)	64.1 (17.8)	72.7 (22.6)	78.9 (26.1)	82.0 (27.8)	81.0 (27.2)	76.8 (24.9)	67.9 (19.9)	58.1 (14.5)	51.0 (10.6)	65.5 (18.6)
Mean daily minimum °F (°C)	36.5 (2.5)	39.0 (3.9)	44.7 (7.1)	53.5 (11.9)	63.2 (17.3)	69.9 (21.1)	73.0 (22.8)	72.0 (22.2)	67.7 (19.8)	57.5 (14.2)	47.0 (8.3)	39.8 (4.3)	55.3 (13.0)
Mean minimum °F (°C)	23.2 (−4.9)	27.7 (−2.4)	31.6 (−0.2)	41.5 (5.3)	51.9 (11.1)	61.8 (16.6)	67.6 (19.8)	65.6 (18.7)	58.7 (14.8)	44.2 (6.8)	34.5 (1.4)	27.9 (−2.3)	21.1 (−6.1)
Record low °F (°C)	9 (−13)	12 (−11)	18 (−8)	23 (−5)	37 (3)	49 (9)	59 (15)	55 (13)	46 (8)	22 (−6)	22 (−6)	11 (−12)	9 (−13)
Average precipitation inches (mm)	3.81 (97)	3.30 (84)	3.49 (89)	3.59 (91)	3.33 (85)	5.36 (136)	5.97 (152)	3.72 (94)	5.47 (139)	3.94 (100)	3.00 (76)	3.62 (92)	51.60 (1,311)
Average precipitation days (≥ 0.01 in)	10.4	8.6	8.2	7.0	6.1	9.0	10.5	10.5	7.9	7.8	8.0	9.8	103.8
Source 1: NOAA (precip days 1981–2010)
Source 2: National Weather Service

== Airport ==
The town of Sullivan's Island is served by the Charleston International Airport. It is located in the City of North Charleston and is about 12 mi (19 km) northwest of Sullivan's Island. It is the busiest passenger airport in South Carolina (IATA: CHS, ICAO: KCHS). The airport shares runways with the adjacent Charleston Air Force Base. Charleston Executive Airport is a smaller airport located in the John's Island section of the city of Charleston and is used by noncommercial aircraft. Both airports are owned and operated by the Charleston County Aviation Authority.

== Demographics ==
Historical population
Census	Pop.	Note	%±
1960	1,358		—
1970	1,426		5.0%
1980	1,867		30.9%
1990	1,623		−13.1%
2000	1,911		17.7%
2010	1,791		−6.3%
2020	1,891		5.6%
U.S. Decennial Census

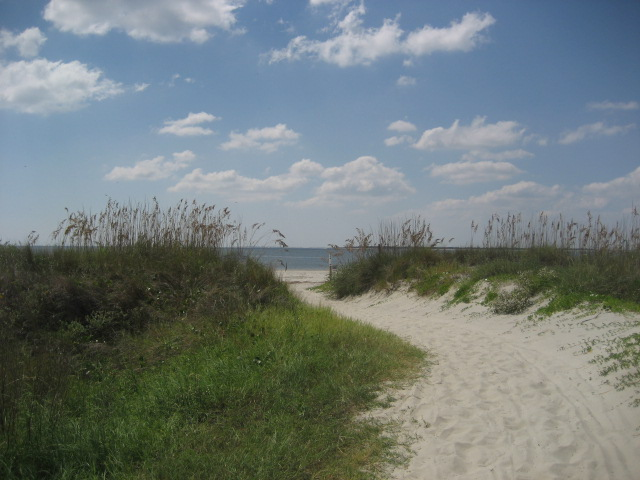
The beach at Sullivan's Island

=== 2020 census ===
Sullivan's Island racial composition
Race	Num.	Perc.
White (non-Hispanic)	1,770	93.6%
Black or African American (non-Hispanic)	7	0.37%
Asian	16	0.85%
Other/Mixed	51	2.7%
Hispanic or Latino	47	2.49%

As of the 2020 United States census, there were 1,891 people, 821 households, and 619 families residing in the town.

=== 2000 census ===
As of the census of 2000, there were 1,911 people, 797 households, and 483 families residing in the town. The population density was 787.2 inhabitants per square mile (303.9/km^{2}). There were 1,045 housing units at an average density of 430.5 per square mile (166.2/km^{2}). The racial makeup of the town was 98.74% White, 0.63% African American, 0.05% Native American, 0.16% Asian, and 0.42% from race were 0.84% of the population. .

There were 797 households, out of which 29.1% had children under the age of 18 living with them, 50.9% were married couples living together, 7.0% had a female householder with no husband present, and 39.3% were non-families. 29.9% of all households were made up of individuals, and 7.0% had someone living alone who was 65 years of age or older. The average household size was 2.40 and the average family size was 3.01.

In the town, the population was spread out, with 24.0% under the age of 18, 5.0% from 18 to 24, 29.0% from 25 to 44, 31.0% from 45 to 64, and 10.9% who were 65 years of age or older. The median age was 41 years. For every 100 females, there were 100.7 males. For every 100 females age 18 and over, there were 97.7 males.

The median income for a household in the town was $72,955, and the median income for a family was $96,455. Males had a median income of $58,571 versus $41,029 for females. The per capita income for the town was $49,427. About 1.4% of families and 4.2% of the population were below the poverty line, including 2.2% of those under age 18 and 0.9% of those age 65 or over.

Sullivan's Island has some of the highest per capita real estate costs in the United States. Although not the most expensive in the region, home values on Sullivan's Island, based on the small size of the island and number of regular residents, makes it one of the priciest locations.

=== Ethnicity ===
As of 2016 the largest self-reported ancestries/ethnicities in Sullivan's Island, South Carolina were:

Largest ancestries (2016)	Percent
English	19.5%
German	14.0%
Irish	12.6%
"American"	11.5%
French	10.0%
Scottish	6.0%
Italian	3.4%
Russian	2.8%
Polish	2.0%
Dutch	1.6%

== Education ==
There is one school district in the county, Charleston County School District.

It is zoned to Sullivan's Island Elementary School, Moultrie Middle School, and Wando High School.

== Literary references ==
- The writer Edgar Allan Poe was stationed at Fort Moultrie from November 1827 to December 1828. The island is a setting for much of his short story "The Gold-Bug" (1843). In Poe's short story "The Balloon-Hoax", a gas balloon (forerunner of the dirigible) is piloted by eight men, two of them making independent diary entries, and describes a trip from Northern Wales to Fort Moultrie, Sullivan's Island over the course 75 hours. (Written in a dry, scientific style, Poe's account was published as fact in a New York City newspaper in 1844 and retracted three days later.) Today, the town library on Sullivan's Island, situated in a refurbished military battery, is named after the poet, and streets such as Raven (after his narrative poem "The Raven" published in 1845) and Gold Bug avenues commemorate his works. His poem "Annabel Lee" is said to be written about a girl Poe fell in love with when stationed in Fort Moultrie in the early 1830s.
- The novel Sullivan's Island by Dorothea Benton Frank is set here.
- Pat Conroy set his semi-autobiographical memoir The Boo (1970) and the novel Beach Music (1995) here. He also features Sullivan's Island in his novel South of Broad (2009).
- In Lawrence Hill's novel The Book of Negroes, the main character, Aminata Diallo, passes through Sullivan's Island in 1757 at the age of 11 after being kidnapped in Mali and sold into slavery.

== Musical references ==
Sullivan's Island is mentioned in the song Palmetto Rose by Jason Isbell in his 2015 album Something More Than Free.

== Other references ==
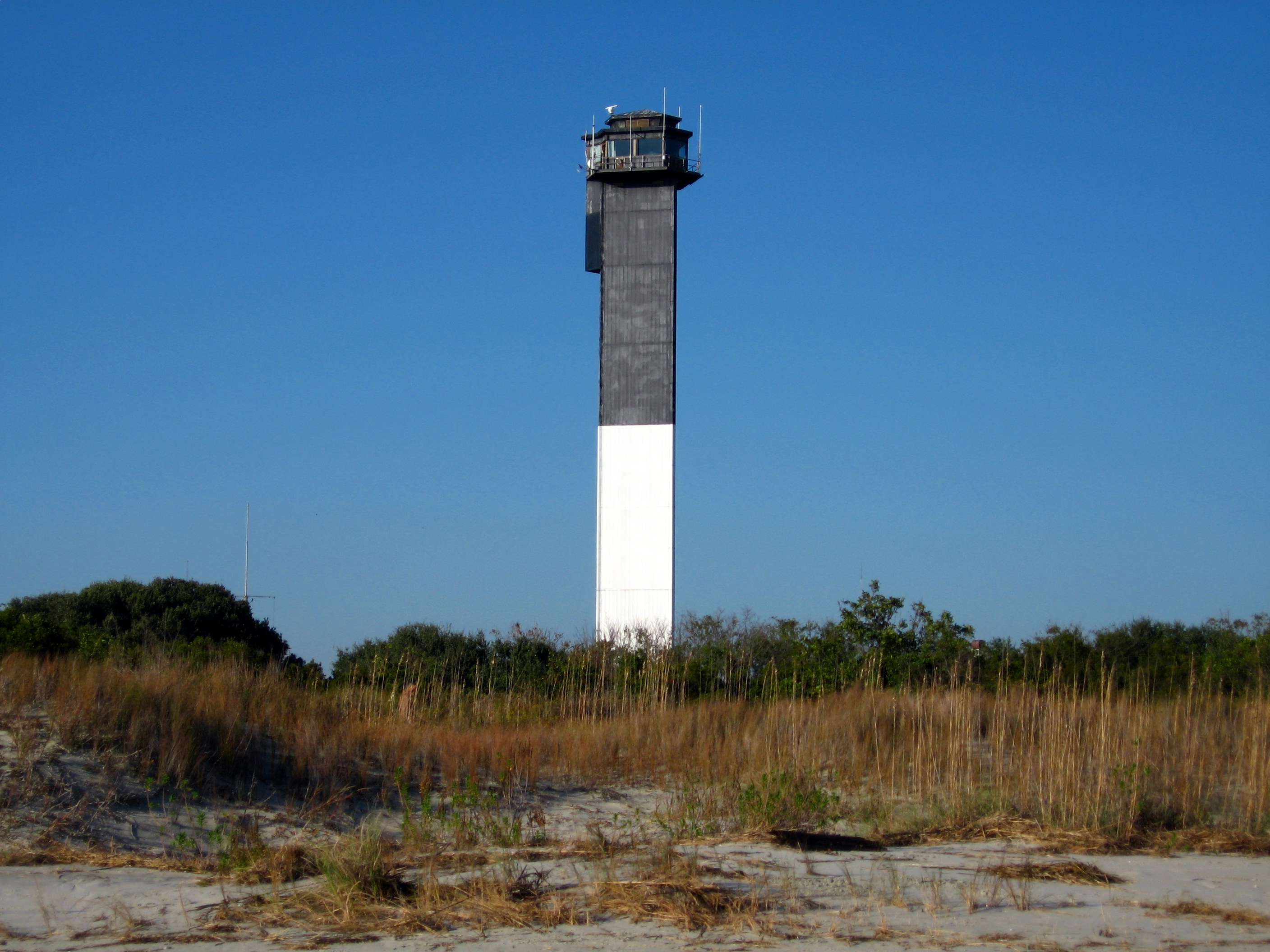
Charleston Light

E. Lee Spence, a pioneer underwater archaeologist, was a longtime resident of Sullivan's Island. In the 1960s and 1970s, he discovered many shipwrecks along its shores. Those discoveries included the Civil War blockade runners Flora, Beatrice, Stono, Flamingo, Prince Albert, and the Celt (also known as the Colt).

In 1981, adventure novelist and marine archaeologist Clive Cussler and his organization, the National Underwater and Marine Agency, discovered the wreck of the blockade runner Raccoon off Sullivan's Island.

Several districts and properties on Sullivans' Island have been listed in the National Register of Historic Places: Atlanticville Historic District, Moultrieville Historic District, Sullivans Island Historic District, Fort Moultrie Historic District, U. S. Coast Guard Historic District, Battery Gadsden and Battery Thomson.

== Notable people ==
- Bill Murray, actor and comedian

== See also ==
- Battle of Sullivan's Island
- John Henry Devereux, a South Carolina architect who had the largest mansion on the island
