= Union National Bank Building (Columbia, South Carolina) =

- U.S. National Register of Historic Places
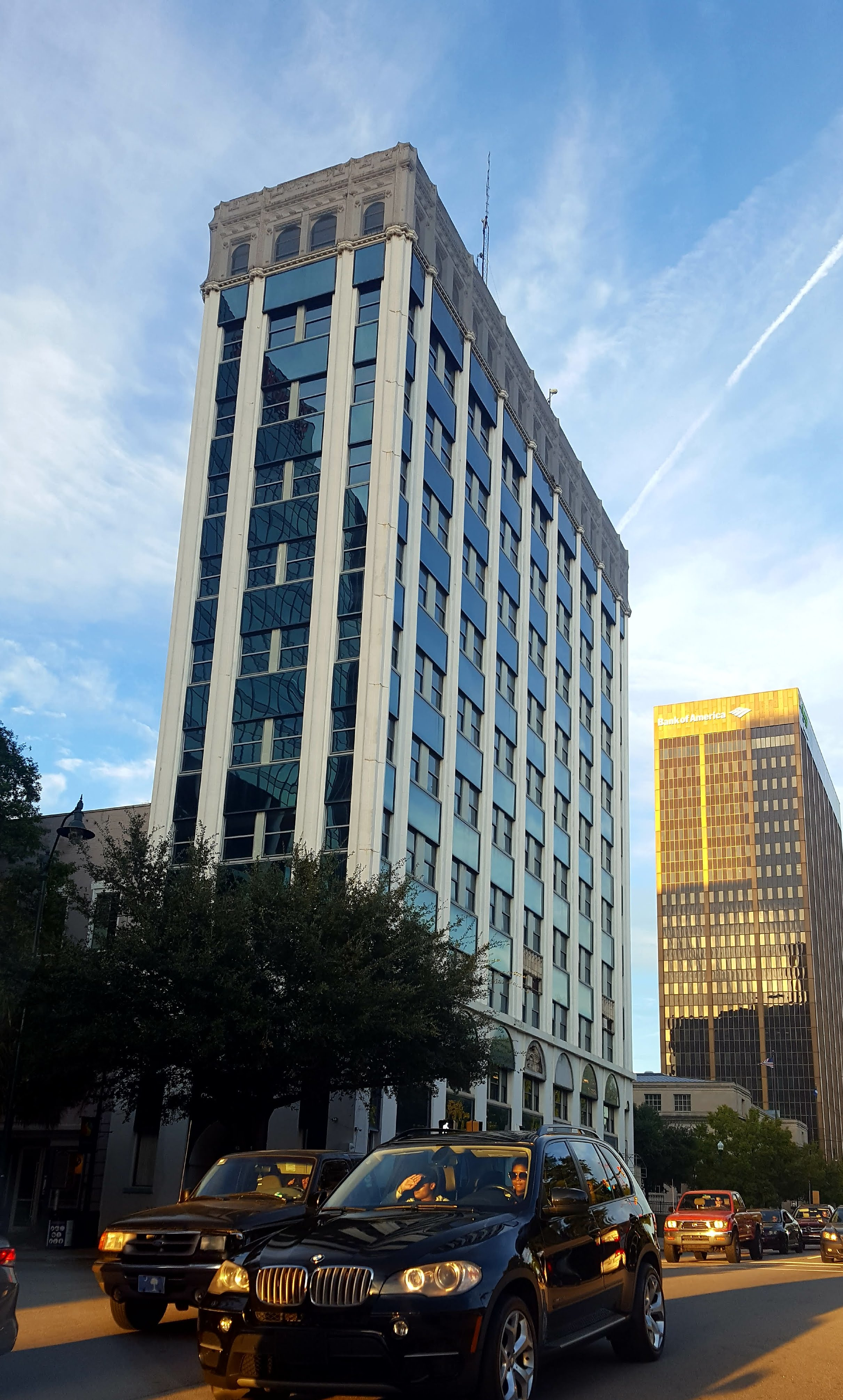

- Location within South Carolina Location within the United States
- Location: 1200 Main St. Columbia, South Carolina
- Coordinates: 34°00′05″N 81°02′00″W
- Area: <1 acre (0.40 ha)
- Built: 1912-1913
- Architect: William Augustus Edwards
- Architectural style: Late Gothic Revival
- NRHP reference No.: 100003307
- Added to NRHP: January 14, 2019

The Union National Bank Building is an historic building located in downtown Columbia, South Carolina, United States. The ten story Late Gothic Revival and Sullivanesque structure was completed in 1913. It was designed by Atlanta architect William Augustus Edwards. Its decorative terra cotta details on the Gervais and Main Street facades were covered sometime in the 1960s and another renovation in the 1990s. Its significance is based on its association with business and state government. Building an office building instead of a stand-alone bank represents the strength of the city's economy in the early 20th-century. Its location across the street from the South Carolina State House allowed the bank to lease office space to the state who struggled to provide adequate office space themselves. The building was added to the National Register of Historic Places on January 14, 2019.

== See also ==
- Afro-American Insurance Company Building
- Efird's Department Store
- Dr. John B. Patrick House
- Sylvan Building
