= George Edwin Lord =

American army assistant surgeon

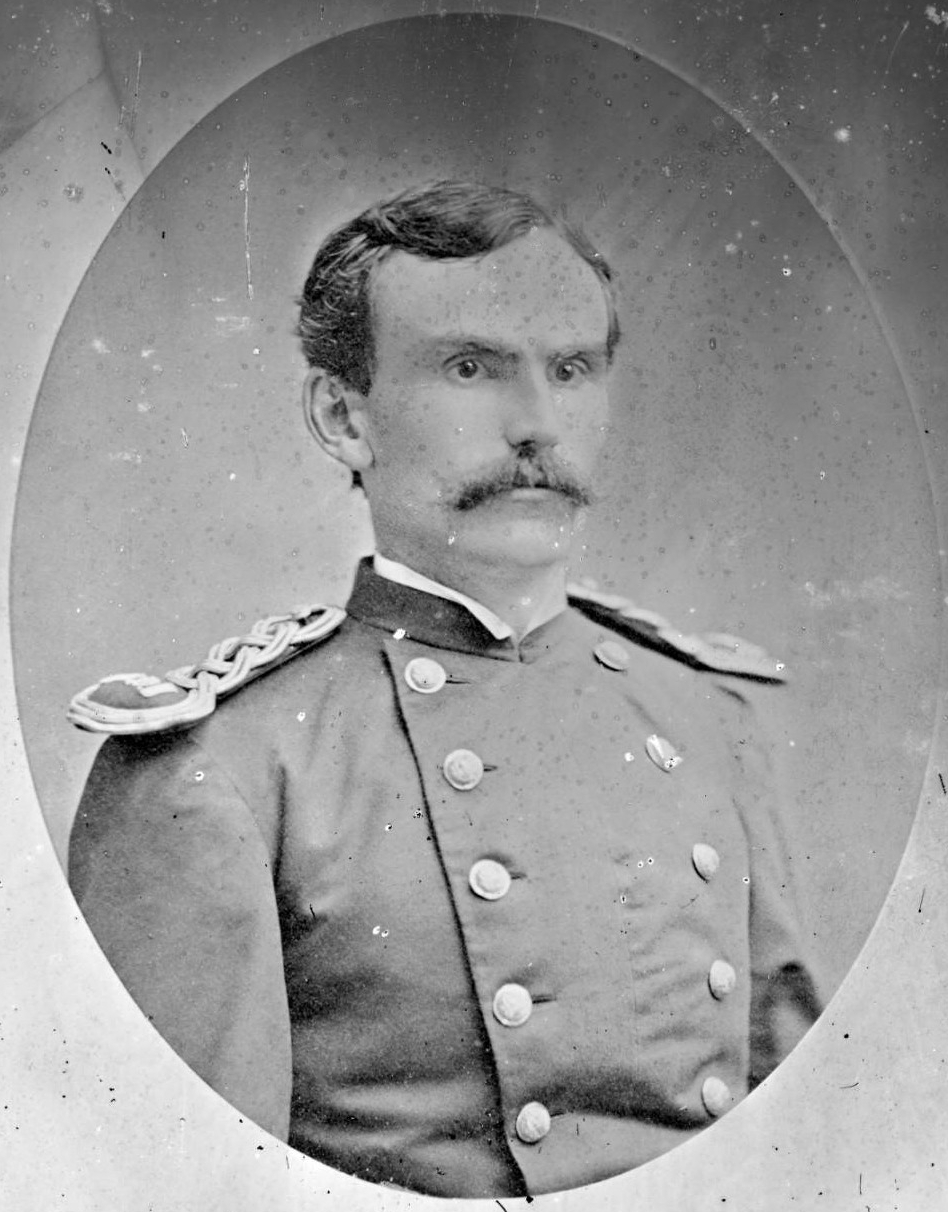
- Born: February 17, 1846; Brunswick, Maine
- Died: June 25, 1876 (aged 30); Montana
- Military career
- Allegiance: United States of America
- Branch: United States Army
- Service years: 1875–76
- Rank: Assistant Surgeon
- Unit: 7th U.S. Cavalry
- Conflicts: American Indian Wars: Battle of the Little Big Horn

George Edwin Lord (February 17, 1846 – June 25, 1876) was a U.S. Army Assistant Surgeon in the 7th Cavalry who was killed in the Battle of the Little Big Horn in Montana Territory during the Black Hills War.

Lord was born in Brunswick, Maine and graduated from Bowdoin College. He attended medical school and moved west to serve in the U.S. Army at various forts and outposts. He entered into another contract with the U. S. Army in January 1875 and was made a first lieutenant in the 7th Cavalry, posted in Fort Abraham Lincoln in the Dakota Territory.

During the Great Sioux War, he accompanied Lt. Col. George Armstrong Custer's column towards the Little Bighorn River, where he was killed in action. Dr. Lord's body was not positively identified by the first burial crews, and he was initially listed by General Alfred H. Terry and others as missing in action. Captain Otto E. Michaelis and Lieutenant Richard E. Thompson, however, later contacted Lord's brother with their belief that a body sighted on the field had been the doctor's, based on a blue shirt the corpse was wearing as well as "the shapely hands, the moustache, and general appearance." Michaelis also thought the socks on the corpse were from the same set of three pairs Lord had earlier purchased from a trader at Powder River. Based on this new information, three months after the battle Terry recommended that Lord's status be changed to killed in action.

However, there is no marker with Lord's name at the Little Bighorn Battlefield National Monument that specifically marks this reported death site. In 1890, a marker for Lord was placed on the so-called South Skirmish Line, based on the discovery there of buttons that were thought to be part of a staff officer's uniform which doctors would wear.

Lord's surgical kit eventually was recovered from the Indians and sent to the Army's medical museum.
