= Dr. John B. Patrick House =

Historic house in South Carolina, United States

- U.S. National Register of Historic Places
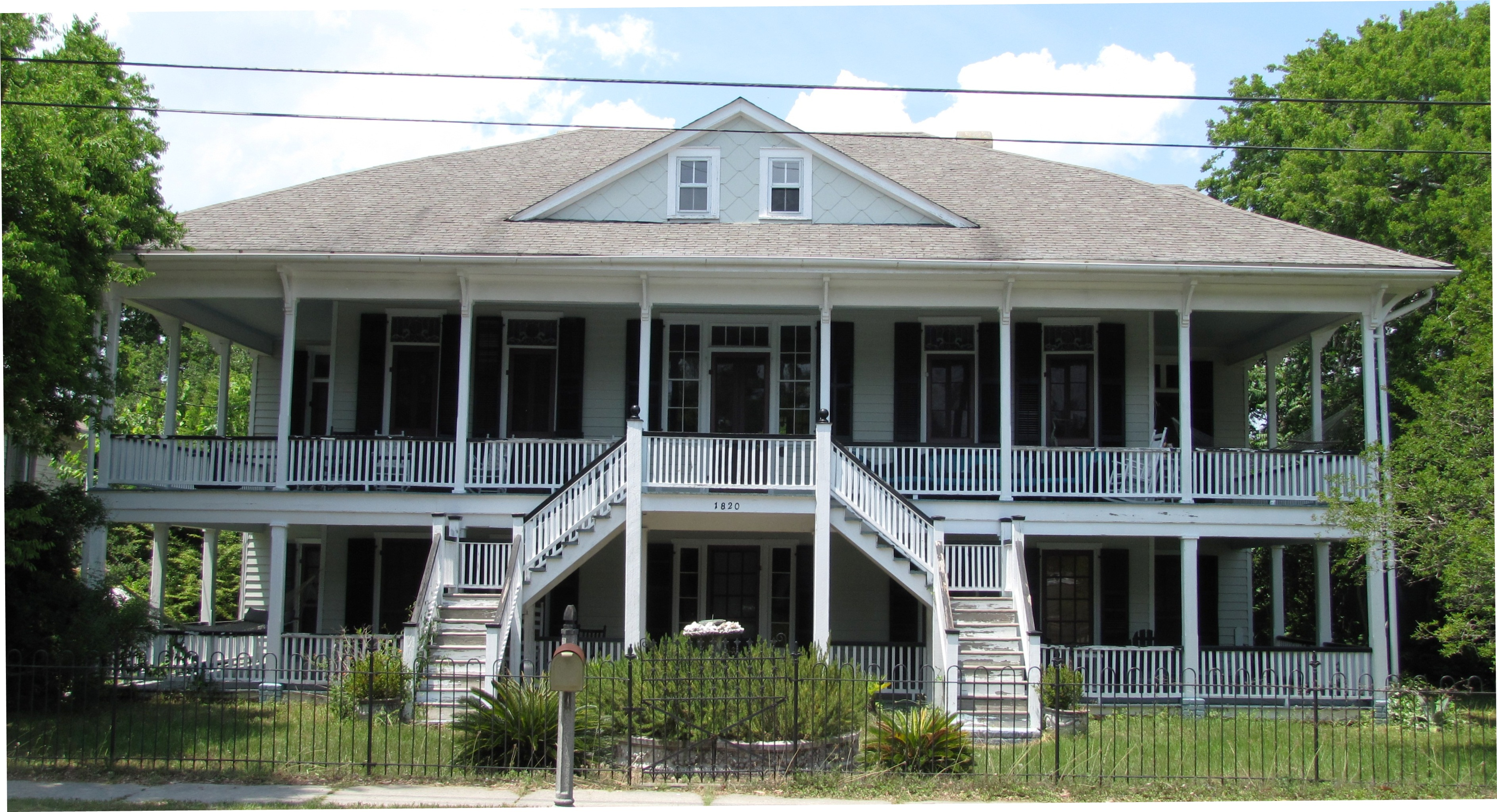
- Dr. John B. Patrick House, May 2010

- Location within South Carolina Location within the United States
- Location: 1820 Middle St., Sullivan's Island, South Carolina
- Coordinates: 32°45′35″N 79°50′36″W
- Area: 0.6 acres (0.24 ha)
- Built: 1920
- Architectural style: Classical Revival, Late Victorian
- NRHP reference No.: 94001628
- Added to NRHP: February 9, 1995

Dr. John B. Patrick House also known as the Patrick-Bherman-Smith House and Moultrieville Brothel, is a historic home located at Sullivan's Island, Charleston County, South Carolina. The house is a 2 1/2-story, symmetrical frame residence with a two-tiered, integral wraparound piazza. It features an expansive hipped roof with dormers and stairs that lead to the second tier of the piazza. A small rectangular frame structure, built about 1920 as a general store, is located on the property.

The house was built c. 1870 by Dr. John B Patrick as a home for him and his family. They lived in the house until Patrick died in 1903, and Patrick left the house in his will to his son Charles. Shortly thereafter, Charles sold the house to William Bherman, who converted into a place of business. The first floor became a tavern, with a brothel operating out of the second and third floors. In 1920, Mary Smith and her sisters purchased the building and remodeled it to become three residential units. Smith lived in the building until she died and left it in her will to her niece, Ethyl Merrill, who lived there until c. 1974. Merill's granddaughter lived in the building until 1984. The property remained vacant for the next six years. Hurricane Hugo hit Sullivan's Island in November 1989 and greatly damaged the building. John Geer purchased the house in 1990 and began renovations. It was listed on the National Register of Historic Places in 1995.
