= William Drayton (disambiguation) =

William Drayton may refer to:

- William Drayton Sr. (1732–1790), American judge from Charleston, South Carolina
- William Drayton (1776–1846), U.S. Congressman from Charleston, South Carolina
- Bill Drayton (born 1943), American social entrepreneur and environmentalist
- Flavor Flav (born 1959), real name William Drayton, American rapper with Public Enemy
- William Henry Drayton (1742–1779), American lawyer, South Carolina delegate to Continental Congress
- Billy Drayton, character in The Mist

== See also ==
- William L. Dayton (1807–1864), American politician
- William Lewis Dayton Jr. (1829–1897), American lawyer, judge and diplomat
