= Thomas Bee =

American judge

Judge of the United States District Court for the District of South Carolina
- In office June 14, 1790 – February 18, 1812
- Appointed by: George Washington
- Preceded by: William Drayton Sr.
- Succeeded by: John Drayton

6th Lieutenant Governor of South Carolina
- In office January 9, 1779 – January 24, 1780
- Governor: John Rutledge
- Preceded by: James Parsons
- Succeeded by: Christopher Gadsden

3rd Speaker of the South Carolina House of Representatives
- In office Summer of 1777 – November 1778
- Preceded by: John Mathews
- Succeeded by: John Mathews

Personal details
- Born: Thomas Bee; 1739 Charleston, Province of South Carolina, British America
- Died: February 18, 1812 (aged 72–73) Pendleton, South Carolina, U.S.
- Resting place: Woodstock Cemetery; Goose Creek, South Carolina
- Children: Barnard E. Bee Sr.
- Relatives: Carlos Bee; Barnard Elliott Bee Jr. Hamilton P. Bee
- Education: University of Oxford read law

Thomas Bee (1739 – February 18, 1812) was a delegate to the Second Continental Congress, the 6th lieutenant governor of South Carolina and a United States district judge of the United States District Court for the District of South Carolina.

== Education and career ==
Born in 1739 in Martigny, Province of South Carolina, British America, Bee attended the University of Oxford and read law in 1761. He entered private practice in Charleston from 1761 to 1762, and subsequently engaged in private practice from 1765 to 1769, 1769 to 1772, and 1782 to 1786, also engaging in planting. He was a member of the South Carolina Commons House of Assembly from 1762 to 1765, and from 1772 to 1776. He was a Justice of the Peace in 1775. He was a member of the Council of Safety in 1775 and 1776. He was a member of the South Carolina General Assembly from 1776 to 1778. He was a member of the South Carolina House of Representatives from 1778 to 1779, 1781 to 1782, and 1786 to 1788, serving as Speaker in January and February 1779. He was a commissioner for stamping and issuing paper bills of credit in Charleston in 1769. He was Lieutenant Governor of South Carolina in 1780. He was a delegate to the Second Continental Congress (Continental Congress) from 1780 to 1781. In 1781, Bee was elected a member of the American Philosophical Society. He was a member of the South Carolina Senate from 1788 to 1790.

== Federal judicial service ==
Bee was nominated by President George Washington on June 11, 1790, to a seat on the United States District Court for the District of South Carolina vacated by Judge William Drayton Sr. He was confirmed by the United States Senate on June 14, 1790, and received his commission the same day. He published reports of the district court in 1810. His service terminated on February 18, 1812, due to his death in Pendleton, South Carolina. He was interred in Woodstock Cemetery in Goose Creek, South Carolina.

Bee was nominated by President John Adams to be Chief Judge of the United States Circuit Court for the Fifth Circuit on February 21, 1801, and was confirmed by the Senate on February 24, 1801, but he declined the appointment.

== Family ==
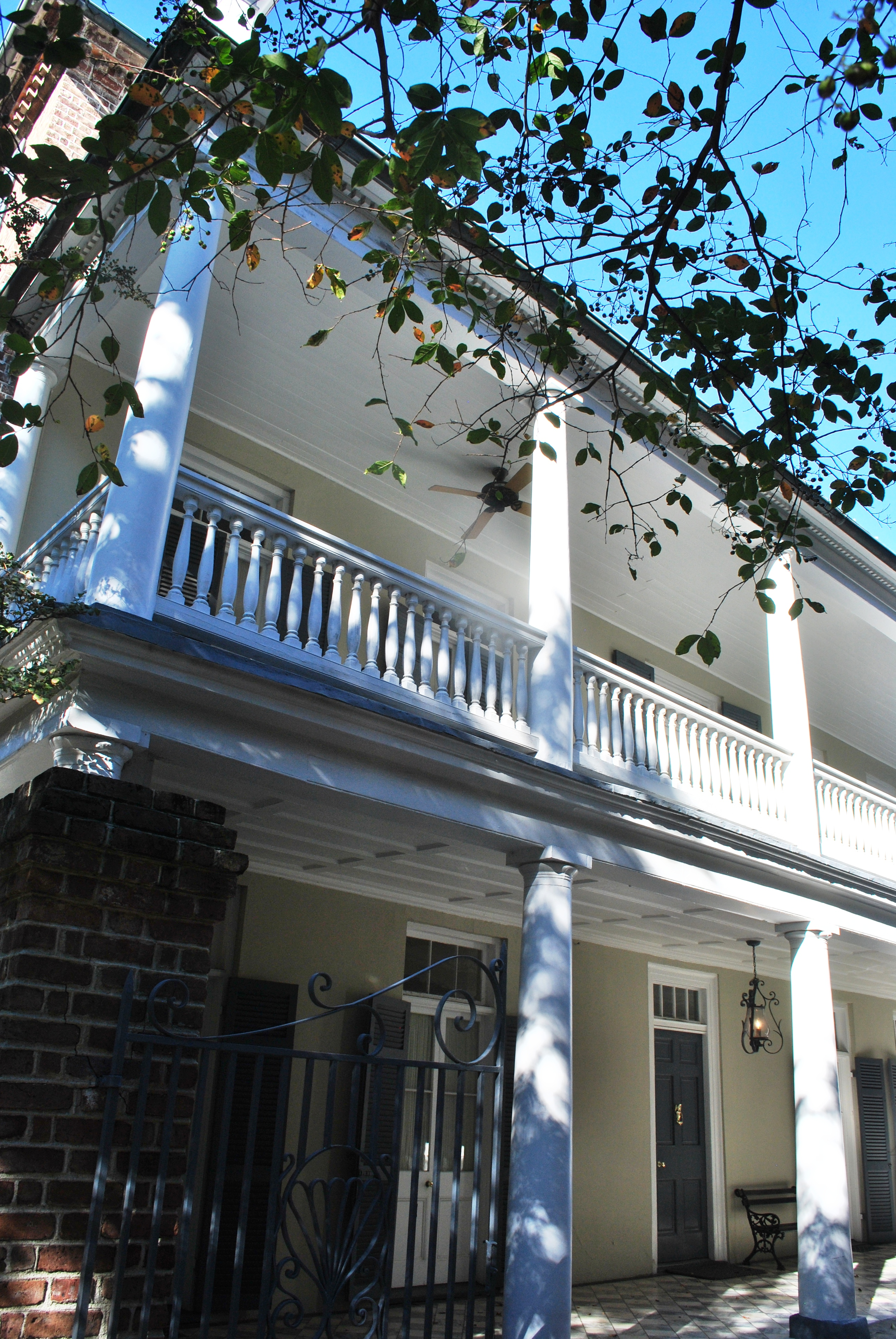
Thomas Bee's House, Charleston, ca. 1730.

Bee was the father of Barnard E. Bee Sr., who took part in the Texas Revolution and who was a political figure in the Republic of Texas, and the great grandfather of Carlos Bee, a United States representative from Texas. Two of Barnard's sons became known as Confederate generals during the American Civil War: Barnard Elliott Bee Jr. and Hamilton P. Bee.

== Sources ==
- United States Congress. "Thomas Bee (id: B000304)". Biographical Directory of the United States Congress.
- Thomas Bee at the Biographical Directory of Federal Judges, a publication of the Federal Judicial Center.

Political offices
Preceded by James Parsons	Lieutenant Governor of South Carolina; 1779–1780	Succeeded by Christopher Gadsden
Legal offices
Preceded by William Drayton Sr.	Judge of the United States District Court for the District of South Carolina; 1790–1812	Succeeded by John Drayton
