= 1783 South Carolina gubernatorial election =

- January 31, 1783
Nominee	Benjamin Guerard
Party	Nonpartisan
Popular vote	1
Percentage	100.00%
Governor before election
John Mathews
Nonpartisan
Elected Governor
Benjamin Guerard
Nonpartisan

The 1783 South Carolina gubernatorial election was held on January 31, 1783, in order to elect the Governor of South Carolina. Candidate and incumbent member of the South Carolina House of Representatives Benjamin Guerard was elected by the South Carolina General Assembly as he ran unopposed. The exact number of votes cast in this election is unknown.

== General election ==
On election day, January 31, 1783, candidate Benjamin Guerard was elected by the South Carolina General Assembly. Guerard was sworn in as the 34th Governor of South Carolina on February 4, 1783.

=== Results ===
South Carolina gubernatorial election, 1783
Party	Candidate	Votes	%
Nonpartisan	Benjamin Guerard	1	100.00%
Total votes		1	100.00%
Nonpartisan hold			
