= William Henry Drayton =

American Founding Father and politician

William Drayton
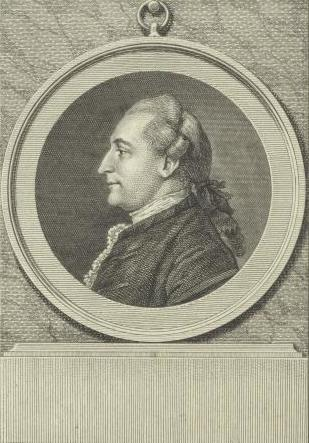
- Portrait of Drayton
- Born: September 1742; Charleston, South Carolina, British America
- Died: 3 September 1779 (aged 36–37); Strawberry Ferry Tavern, Berkeley County, South Carolina, U.S.
- Children: John

William Henry Drayton (September 1742 – September 3, 1779) was an American Founding Father, planter, and lawyer from Charles Town, South Carolina. He served as a delegate for South Carolina to the Continental Congress in 1778-79 and signed the Articles of Confederation.

== Early life ==
William Henry was born on his family's plantation, Drayton Hall, on the bank of the Ashley River near Charleston. His father John Drayton had just completed construction of a massive main house on the rice plantation. His mother was Charlotta Bull Drayton, the daughter of the colony's Governor William Bull. Drayton Hall would remain William's home throughout his life.

In 1750, he was sent to England for his education. He first studied at Westminster School where he met Charles Cotesworth Pinckney. Then he went on to Balliol College, Oxford, before returning home in 1764. He read law and was admitted to the bar in South Carolina.

Drayton married Dorothy Golightly in 1764; they were the parents of South Carolina Governor John Drayton. He was the cousin of U.S. Representative William Drayton, the son of Judge William Drayton Sr.

== Career ==
Drayton at first opposed the growing sense of colonial unity and resistance after the Stamp Act Congress but reversed his position as the Revolution grew nearer. He first wrote a series of published letters opposing the American actions. When they were published in England, he was made a member of the Colonial Council in 1772. Governor Bull appointed him to the Colony's Court in 1774. However, later that year he wrote a pamphlet, the American Claim of Rights, which supported the call for a Continental Congress. Subsequently he was removed from all government positions, which completed his conversion to the Patriot cause.

He became a member of South Carolina's Committee of safety in 1775 as well as the provisional Congress that functioned as the colony's rebel government. In 1776, he and Arthur Middleton designed the Seal of South Carolina. When they began operating under an interim constitution in 1776, he returned to his seat on the council, serving as chief justice of state's Supreme Court. When the South Carolina General Assembly unanimously voted for union with Georgia in 1776, Drayton became the chief champion of the proposal. The union was rejected by a Georgia convention on January 23, 1777, but Drayton continued to campaign in Georgia for union until Governor John A. Treutlen issued a reward for his arrest. In 1778, South Carolina sent Drayton as a delegate to the Continental Congress, where he gave strong support to the military.

Drayton became noted for his animosity toward Natives, particularlly the Cherokees. He wanted their "nation be extirpated and the lands become the property of the public. For my part, I shall never give my voice for a peace with the Cherokee Nation upon any other terms than their removal beyond the mountains."

== Death ==
Drayton suffered a seizure while crossing the Strawberry Ferry in modern-day Berkeley County, South Carolina, and died shortly after at the nearby Strawberry Ferry Tavern on September 3, 1779, while serving in Congress. He was 37. His home, Drayton Hall, now lies within the expanded city of Charleston. It is operated as a museum and is open to the public for an admission fee.
