= Carlos Bee =

American politician (1867–1932)

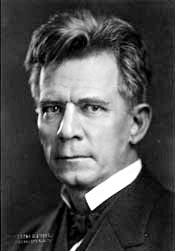

Member of the U.S. House of Representatives from Texas's 14th district
- In office March 4, 1919 – March 3, 1921
- Preceded by: James Luther Slayden
- Succeeded by: Harry M. Wurzbach

Personal details
- Born: July 8, 1867 Saltillo, Mexico
- Died: April 20, 1932 (aged 64) San Antonio, Texas
- Party: Democratic
- Spouse: Mary Kyle Burleson
- Relations: Barnard Elliott Bee Jr. (uncle); Barnard E. Bee Sr. (grandfather); Thomas Bee (great-grandfather)
- Children: Carlos Bee
- Parent(s): Hamilton P. Bee; Mildred Tarver

Carlos Bee (July 8, 1867 – April 20, 1932) was an American attorney and politician who served as the U.S. representative from Texas's 14th congressional district from 1919 to 1921. He was a son of Hamilton P. Bee and a great-grandson of Thomas Bee, a politician and judge in South Carolina in the Revolutionary and Federal periods.

== Early life and education ==
Carlos Bee was born in 1867 in Saltillo, Mexico, where his parents Hamilton Prioleau Bee and Mildred Tarver Bee had moved from San Antonio after the collapse of the Confederacy and the end of the American Civil War. His father had been a general in the Confederate Army.

In 1874, when Bee was about seven years old, the family returned to San Antonio. He attended the public schools and the Agricultural and Mechanical College. He studied law while working as a railway mail clerk. After passing the bar, he started a law practice.

== Career ==
After being admitted to the bar in 1893, Bee started a law practice in San Antonio. He joined the Democratic Party and was appointed as United States commissioner for the western district of Texas in 1893. On January 16, 1895, Bee married Mary Kyle Burleson (December 14, 1873 – April 3, 1923), who was the daughter of Emma (née Kyle) and Edward Burleson. His wife was one of the founders of the Pan-American Round Tables.

He was appointed as district attorney of the thirty-seventh judicial district, serving 1898–1905. He served as delegate to the Democratic National Convention in 1904 and 1908, and was elected as chairman in 1904. In his first electoral office, Bee served as a member of the city school board of San Antonio 1906–1908. He was appointed as president of the county school board of Bexar County, Texas from 1912 to 1914.

In 1914, Bee was elected as a member of the Texas State Senate, serving 1915–1919.

In 1918, he was elected as a Democrat to the Sixty-sixth Congress (March 4, 1919 – March 3, 1921). In 1920, he ran unsuccessfully in the primary for re-election to the Sixty-seventh Congress.

== Later years ==
After his defeat in the primary, Bee returned to the practice of law in San Antonio. He worked there until his death there on April 20, 1932. Within a month of his death, Bee's second wife, Mary Elizabeth "Bettie Mae" (née Oliver) died on 27 May 1932. He was interred in the Confederate Cemetery. His son, Carlos Bee, was mayor of Hayward, California and served in the California State Assembly.

U.S. House of Representatives
Preceded by James Luther Slayden	Member of the U.S. House of Representatives from Texas's 14th congressional district March 4, 1919 – March 4, 1921	Succeeded by Harry M. Wurzbach
