= Solomon's Lodge =

Solomon's Lodge may refer to:

- Solomon's Lodge, Savannah, the oldest Masonic Lodge in Georgia
- King Solomon's Lodge, the builders of the original Bunker Hill Monument
- Solomon's Lodge, Charleston, the oldest Masonic Lodge in South Carolina
