= Matthew Fielding Locke =

American politician (1824–1911)

Matthew Francis Locke (1824–1911) was an American politician in Texas. He was elected to the Texas House of Representatives and the Texas Senate. Locke served as Speaker of the Texas House of Representatives in the Seventh Texas Legislature. He was also the first Arkansas Commissioner of Agriculture.

== Early life ==
Locke was born in Murfreesboro, Tennessee on 20 July 1824 to Margaret Bell Bowman and William Locke. In 1836, the family moved to Marshall County, Mississippi.

== Military service ==
Upon the outbreak of the Mexican–American War, Locke enlisted in the 1st Regiment of Mississippi Volunteers, where he was a bodyguard to Col. Jefferson Davis. He tended to Davis’ foot wound and was present at the surrender at the Battle of Buena Vista. Locke also accompanied Maj. Gen. Zachary Taylor when he entered Mexico City.

== Political career ==
After the war, Locke returned to Mississippi, and in 1849 married Elizabeth A. Biue. Shortly thereafter they moved to Upshur County, Texas. He established a plantation about 13 miles (21 km) northeast of present-day Gilmer and founded the nearby town of LaFayette (which he named after his son, LaFayette C. Locke, who was born in 1850). Locke began the first of two terms as a state representative in 1855 in the Sixth Texas Legislature. In the Seventh Legislature, Locke was elected Speaker of the House pro tempore on 26 December 1857 when Speaker William S. Taylor took ill. When Taylor resigned on 18 January 1858, Locke was elected Speaker over Reps. Isaac N. Dennis and John Henry Brown, 39 votes to 14 and 13, respectively.

In 1860, Locke was elected to the Texas Senate from District 6. In 1861, Locke was a member of the Texas Secession Convention, and was on the committee that informed Sam Houston, a lifelong friend of Locke’s, that the convention had removed him from office. When Locke was appointed a colonel in the cavalry by Gov. Edward Clark, he resigned his senate seat and raised the unit that became the 10th Texas Cavalry Regiment when it was transferred to the Confederate Army. He served throughout the war, including at the Battle of Murfreesboro, fought near his hometown.

== Later years ==
In September 1864, shortly after giving birth, Elizabeth Locke died in LaFayette. After the war, Locke settled in Arkansas and was one of the founders of the town of Alma, where he married Narcissa A. Montgomery. His residence, the first in Alma, was constructed in 1868–1869 using lumber hauled in by oxen team, and was located at the corner of Fayetteville Road and Walnut Street. He was elected the first Commissioner of Agriculture for the state of Arkansas in 1887 and served for a number of years. Following the death of Narcissa Locke in 1886, Locke married again in 1890 to Jennie Lester White.

In 1909, Locke returned to Texas for his wife’s health, locating in El Paso. There he died on 4 June 1911. By his three wives, Locke had at least eleven children, about six of whom survived him.

== Notes ==
Texas House of Representatives
Preceded by Unknown	Member of the Texas House of Representatives; 1855–1859	Succeeded by Unknown
Preceded by William S. Taylor	Speaker of the Texas House of Representatives; 18 January 1858–7 November 1859	Succeeded by M. D. K. Taylor
Texas Senate
Preceded by Emory Rains	Texas State Senator from District 6 (LaFayette); 1861	Succeeded by Stephen W. Beasley
Political offices
Preceded by None	Arkansas Commissioner of Agriculture; 1887–?	Succeeded by Unknown
