= 35th (Likens') Texas Cavalry Regiment =

- Active: October 1863 – June 1865
- Country: Confederate States of America
- Allegiance: Confederate States of America, Texas
- Branch: Confederate States Army
- Type: Cavalry
- Size: Regiment
- Engagements: American Civil War; Battle of Mansfield (1864); Battle of Pleasant Hill (1864); Battle of Yellow Bayou (1864)

Commanders
- Notable commanders: James B. Likens

The 35th (Likens') Texas Cavalry Regiment was a unit of mounted volunteers from Texas that fought in the Confederate States Army during the American Civil War. The regiment was formed by consolidating Likens' Texas Cavalry Battalion and Burns' Texas Cavalry Battalion in October 1863. James B. Likens was appointed to lead the new unit, which was in a brigade first led by Hamilton P. Bee and later by Arthur P. Bagby Jr.. It fought at Mansfield and Pleasant Hill in 1864. The regiment moved to Beaumont, Texas, in early 1865, and surrendered there in June 1865.

== See also ==
- List of Texas Civil War Confederate units
