= James Parsons (South Carolina politician) =

American politician

Vice President of South Carolina
- In office June 27, 1777 – January 9, 1779
- President: Rawlins Lowndes
- Preceded by: Henry Laurens
- Succeeded by: Thomas Bee (as lieutenant governor)

1st Speaker of the South Carolina House of Representatives
- In office March 26, 1776 – October 1776
- Preceded by: Office established
- Succeeded by: John Matthews

Personal details
- Born: 1724 Ireland
- Died: October 1799 (aged 74–75) South Carolina
- Party: None

James Parsons (1724 – October 1799) was an American politician and attorney who served as the last vice president of South Carolina from June 27, 1777 to January 9, 1779. He was born in Ireland and migrated to the British colony of South Carolina in 1750.

== Personal life ==
James Parsons studied law Ireland before migrating to the British colony of South Carolina in 1750. In the Province of South Carolina, he worked as a lawyer and soon acquired wealth and prestige. Between 1752 and 1754 and again from 1760 to 1775 he sat in the colonial House of Representatives. In the early 1770s he joined the revolutionary movement, serving as a member of several assemblies and security committees supporting the independence movement. He was a colonel in the Revolutionary War. He also served in the first three terms of the state legislature of the new state of South Carolina.

== Politics ==
In January 1775, Parsons was elected as a member of the South Carolina Committee of Public Safety by the South Carolina Provincial Congress, the goal of which was to establish how the colony should be independently governed after independence from Great Britain. He was later reelected to the position.

In 1776, Parsons was elected as the first Speaker of the South Carolina House of Representatives under the state's first constitution after declaring independence from the Kingdom of Great Britain. Parsons held the position until October of the same year.

On June 27, 1777, Parsons was elected the second vice president of South Carolina, succeeding Henry Laurens after his resignation. Parsons held the position until the term expired January 9 of 1779. Parsons' successor, Thomas Bee, was titled "Lieutenant Governor" instead of "Vice President." Parsons was reelected as lieutenant governor to a second term, but he refused the position citing health concerns. Parsons died nine months later in October of 1799.
