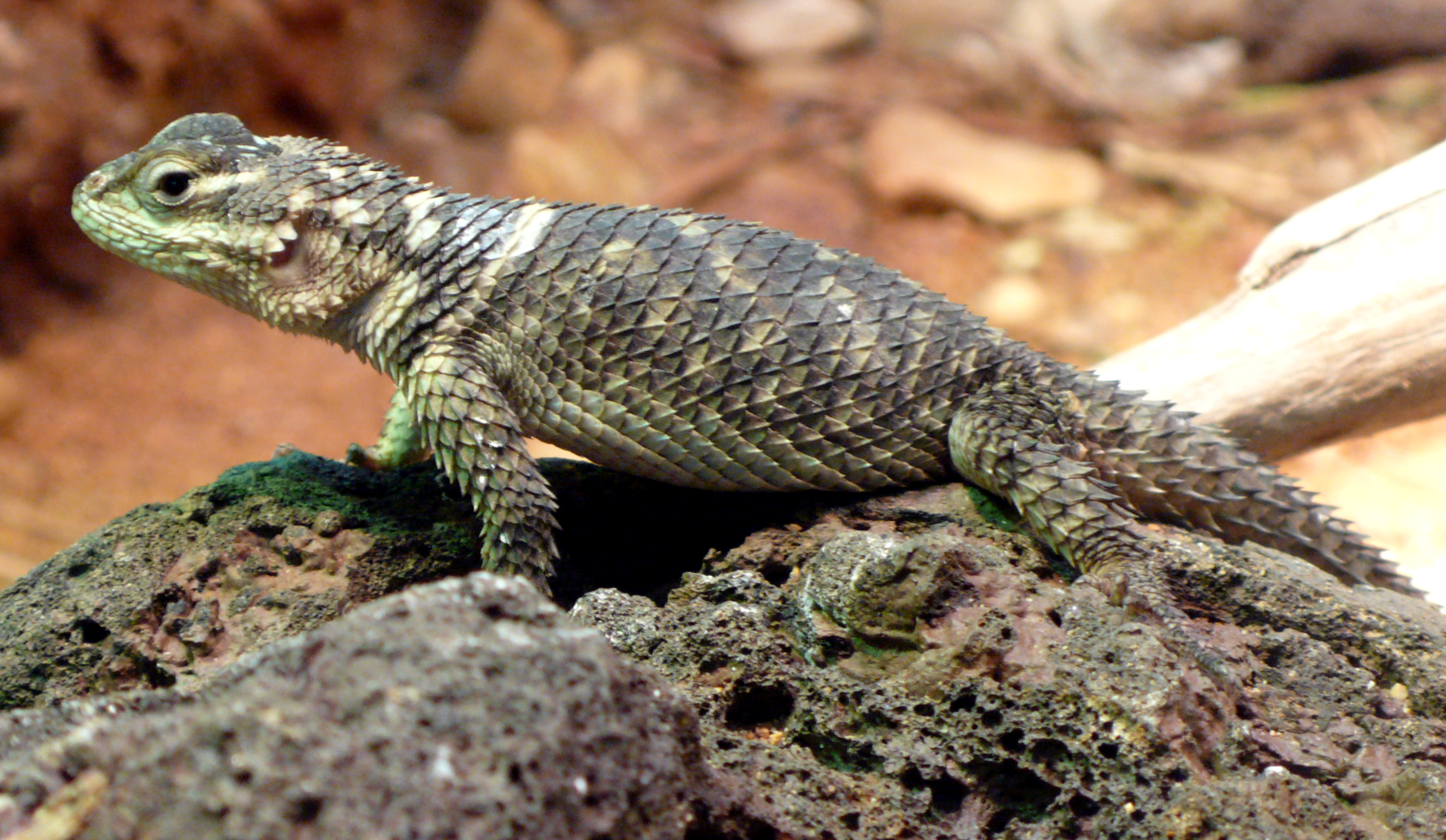

Conservation status
- Least Concern (IUCN 3.1)

- Secure (NatureServe)

Scientific classification
- Kingdom: Animalia
- Phylum: Chordata
- Class: Reptilia
- Order: Squamata
- Suborder: Iguania
- Family: Phrynosomatidae
- Genus: Sceloporus
- Species: S. poinsettii

Binomial name
- Sceloporus poinsettii Baird & Girard, 1852

= Sceloporus poinsettii =

Crevice spiny lizard

Species of lizard

Sceloporus poinsettii, the crevice spiny lizard, is a species of small, phrynosomatid lizard.

== Etymology ==
The epithet, poinsettii, is in honor of American physician, botanist, and statesman, Joel Roberts Poinsett.

== Geographic range ==
In the United States, Sceloporus poinsettii occurs in the Chihuahua Desert and Edwards Plateau regions of Texas and New Mexico. In Mexico it occurs in the border states from the Sierra Madre Occidental of Sonora, eastward through Chihuahua, Coahuila, and Nuevo Leon. Southward its distribution is less well established, although it is known to occur throughout of the state of Durango, parts of Zacatecas, with additional records from San Luis Potosi in the southeast, and the Pacific slopes of the Sierra Madre Occidental of northern Jalisco in the southwest.

== Description ==
The crevice spiny lizard is typically grey in color, but sometimes can have a ruddy red-brown appearance with a black and white collar around the neck region. The underside is typically light grey, but males often have blue patches on either side of their bellies. The tail typically has black banding. Their scales have a distinctly spiny texture. They can grow to 11.8 cm (4.6 in) snout-to-vent length, and 31.1 cm (12.2 inches) total length.

== Behavior ==
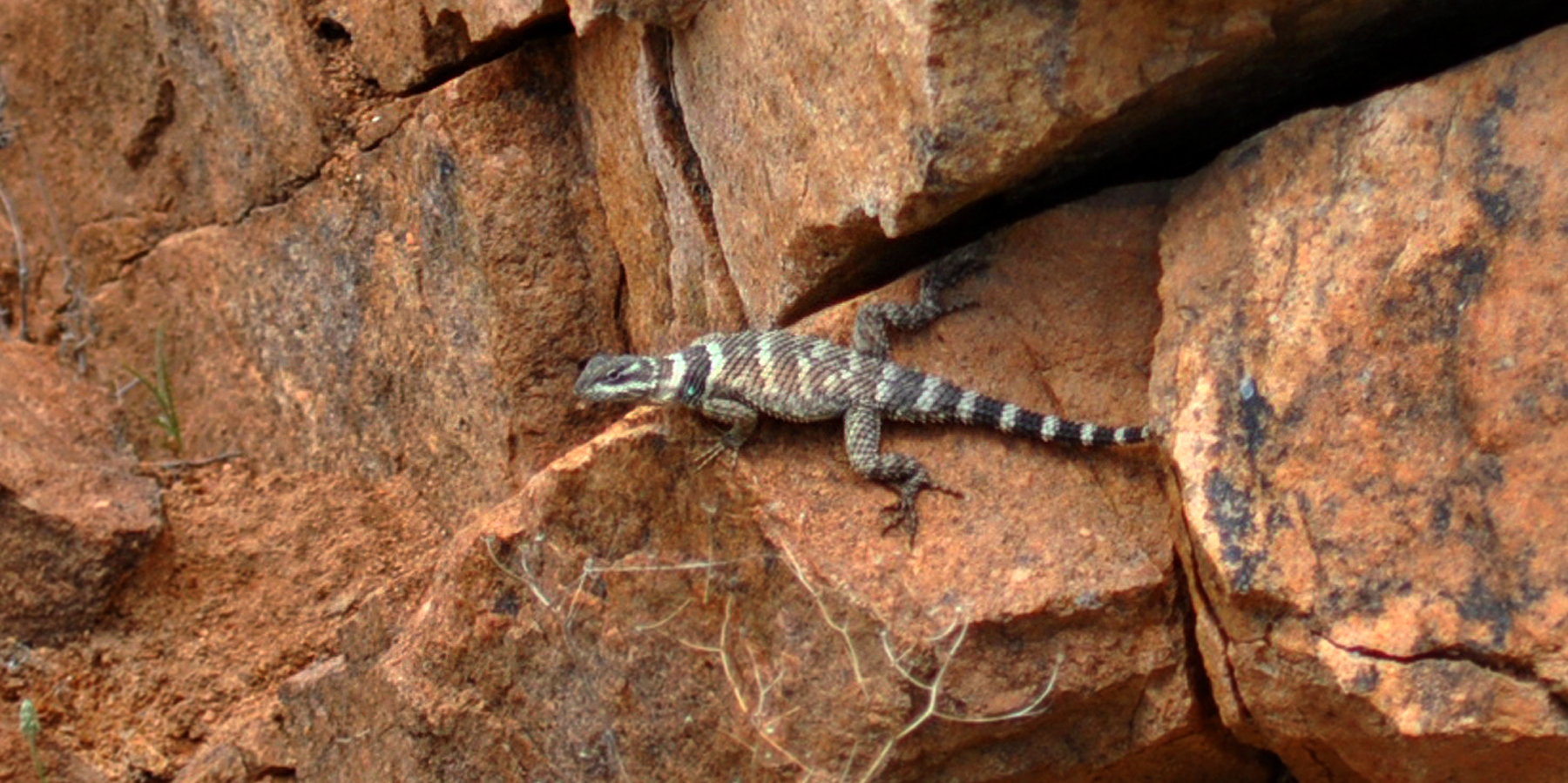
Crevice spiny lizard (Sceloporus poinsettii) photographed in-situ, Mason County, Texas, USA (9 May 2014).

Crevice spiny lizards are typically shy and nervous, fleeing up a rock face or into a crevice if approached. They prefer semi-arid habitats, often of limestone rock, where there are numerous holes and easily accessible cracks.

== Diet ==
Crevice spiny lizards are insectivorous, consuming a wide variety of spiders, beetles, and other insects, but they will sometimes also consume tender vegetation.

== Reproduction ==
Sceloporus poinsettii is one of the several species of Sceloporus that are ovoviviparous. Breeding occurs in the spring, and a litter of up to 11 young are born in midsummer.

== Subspecies ==
Five subspecies are recognized as being valid, including the nominotypical subspecies

- Sceloporus poinsettii amydrus Webb, 2006
- Sceloporus poinsettii axtelli Webb, 2006
- Sceloporus poinsettii macrolepis H.M. Smith & Chrapliwy, 1958
- Sceloporus poinsettii poinsettii Baird & Girard, 1852
- Sceloporus poinsettii polylepis H.M. Smith & Chrapliwy, 1958
