= Richard Beresford =

American politician

Delegate to the Confederation Congress
- In office 1783–1784

9th Lieutenant Governor of South Carolina
- In office February 4, 1783 – March 15, 1783
- Governor: Benjamin Guerard
- Preceded by: Richard Hutson
- Succeeded by: William Moultrie

Personal details
- Born: June 3, 1755 Berkeley County, South Carolina
- Died: February 6, 1803 (aged 47) Charleston, South Carolina, U.S.

Coat of Arms of Richard Beresford

Richard Beresford (June 3, 1755 – February 6, 1803) was an American planter and lawyer from Berkeley County, South Carolina. He was a delegate for South Carolina in the Confederation Congress in 1783 and 1784.

Beresford was born near Charleston, South Carolina and was baptized June 3, 1755. He was educated in South Carolina and in England, studying law at the Middle Temple in London. He became a lawyer in private practice and also engaged in planting, with extensive estates in Berkeley County and Colleton County in South Carolina as well as in England.

He took an active part in the American Revolutionary War, serving as an officer in the 1st South Carolina Regiment under General Isaac Huger in the Georgia campaign in 1778. He was captured at the fall of Charleston in 1780 and imprisoned at St. Augustine until 1781, when he was exchanged. He was member of the South Carolina state house of representatives, 1781 and was elected by the South Carolina state general assembly as a member of the privy council in 1782. He was elected the ninth Lieutenant Governor of South Carolina in January 1783, but resigned shortly afterward, having been elected to the Continental Congress. He was a member of the Confederation Congress in 1783 and 1784, after which he resumed planting. He later engaged in literary pursuits and published the Vigil in Charleston in 1798. He died in Charleston.

The Confederation Congress had scheduled to meet at the Maryland State House in November, 1783, to ratify the Treaty of Paris ending the American Revolutionary War. However, by mid-January only seven of the thirteen states had sent delegates, which was not enough to ratify the treaty. On January 13, 1784, Beresford, who was ill, was the last delegate to arrive. Soon after his arrival, the vote was taken and on January 14, the Congress ratified the treaty.

Political offices
Preceded by Richard Hutson	Lieutenant Governor of South Carolina; 1783	Succeeded by William Moultrie
