= Joel Roberts Poinsett =

American politician and diplomat (1779–1851)

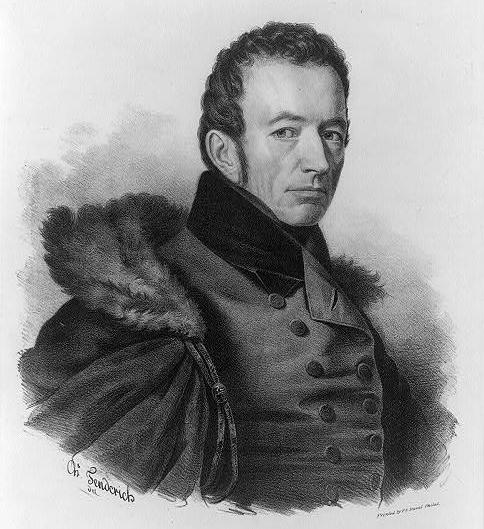

15th United States Secretary of War
- In office March 7, 1837 – March 4, 1841
- President: Martin Van Buren
- Preceded by: Lewis Cass
- Succeeded by: John Bell

United States Minister to Mexico
- In office June 1, 1825 – October 17, 1829
- President: John Quincy Adams; Andrew Jackson
- Preceded by: James Wilkinson (Envoy, 1816-1825)
- Succeeded by: Anthony Butler (Acting)

Member of the U.S. House of Representatives from South Carolina's 1st district
- In office March 4, 1821 – March 7, 1825
- Preceded by: Charles Pinckney
- Succeeded by: William Drayton

Member of the South Carolina House of Representatives
- In office April 1817 – 1819
- In office 1830–1831

Personal details
- Born: Joel Roberts Poinsett; March 2, 1779 Charleston, South Carolina, U.S.
- Died: December 12, 1851 (aged 72) Stateburg, South Carolina, U.S.
- Party: Democratic
- Spouse: Mary Izard Pringle Poinsett
- Parents: Elisha Poinsett; Katherine Ann Roberts
- Education: University of Edinburgh (Edinburgh, Scotland, United Kingdom); Royal Military Academy, (Woolwich, England, United Kingdom)

Joel Roberts Poinsett (March 2, 1779 – December 12, 1851) was an American medical doctor, botanist, politician, and diplomat. He was the first U.S. agent in Hispanic America, a member of the South Carolina Legislature, and later a United States Representative from 1821 to 1825. In 1825, he was appointed by John Quincy Adams as the first United States Minister to Mexico, replacing envoy James Wilkinson, and serving through the first year of Andrew Jackson's administration in 1829. He represented the United States government to the First Mexican Empire, the Provisional Government, and the First Mexican Republic in Mexico City.

Poinsett was a strong supporter of Andrew Jackson and Jacksonian democracy. He was a Unionist leader in South Carolina during the Nullification Crisis in 1832 and 1833, when the state refused to enforce federal tariffs, declaring them unconstitutional.

Poinsett was subsequently appointed 15th U.S. Secretary of War in the Presidential Cabinet under Martin Van Buren.

He was a co-founder of the earlier National Institute for the Promotion of Science and the Useful Arts in 1840, a predecessor of the modern Smithsonian Institution.

== Early life ==
Joel Roberts Poinsett was born in 1779 in Charleston, South Carolina, to a wealthy physician, Elisha Poinsett, and his wife Katherine Ann Roberts. He was educated in Connecticut and University of Edinburgh, gaining expertise in languages, the law, and military affairs.

=== Touring in Europe ===
In 1800 Poinsett returned to Charleston hoping to pursue a military career. His father did not want his son to be a soldier. Hoping to entice his son to settle into the Charleston aristocracy, Poinsett had his son study law under Henry William DeSaussure, a prominent lawyer of Charleston. Poinsett was not interested in becoming a lawyer, and convinced his parents to allow him to go on an extended tour of Europe in 1801. DeSaussure sent with him a list of law books including Blackstone's Commentaries and Burn's Ecclesiastical Law, just in case young Poinsett changed his mind regarding the practice of law.

Beginning in 1801, Poinsett traveled the European continent. In the spring of 1802, Poinsett left France for Italy traveling through the Alps and Switzerland. He visited the cities of Naples and hiked up Mount Etna on the island of Sicily. In the spring of 1803 he arrived in Switzerland and stayed at the home of Jacques Necker and his daughter, Madame de Stael. Necker, French Finance Minister from 1776 to 1781 under Louis XVI, had been driven into exile by Napoleon I.

On one occasion, Robert Livingston, the United States minister to France, was invited for a visit while he was touring Savoy, France, and Switzerland. Poinsett was compelled to assume the role of interpreter between the deaf Livingston and the aged Necker, whose lack of teeth made his speech almost incomprehensible. Fortunately, Madame de Stael tactfully assumed the duty of translation for her elderly father.

In October 1803, Poinsett left Switzerland for Vienna, Austria, and from there journeyed to Munich. In December he received word that his father was dead, and that his sister, Susan, was seriously ill. He immediately secured passage back to Charleston. Poinsett arrived in Charleston early in 1804, months after his father had been laid to rest. Hoping to save his sister's life, Poinsett took her on a voyage to New York, remembering how his earlier voyage to Lisbon had intensified his recovery. Yet, upon arriving in New York City, Susan Poinsett died. As the sole remaining heir, Poinsett inherited a small fortune in town houses and lots, plantations, bank stock, and "English funds." The entire Poinsett estate was valued at a hundred thousand dollars or more.

=== Travel in Russia ===
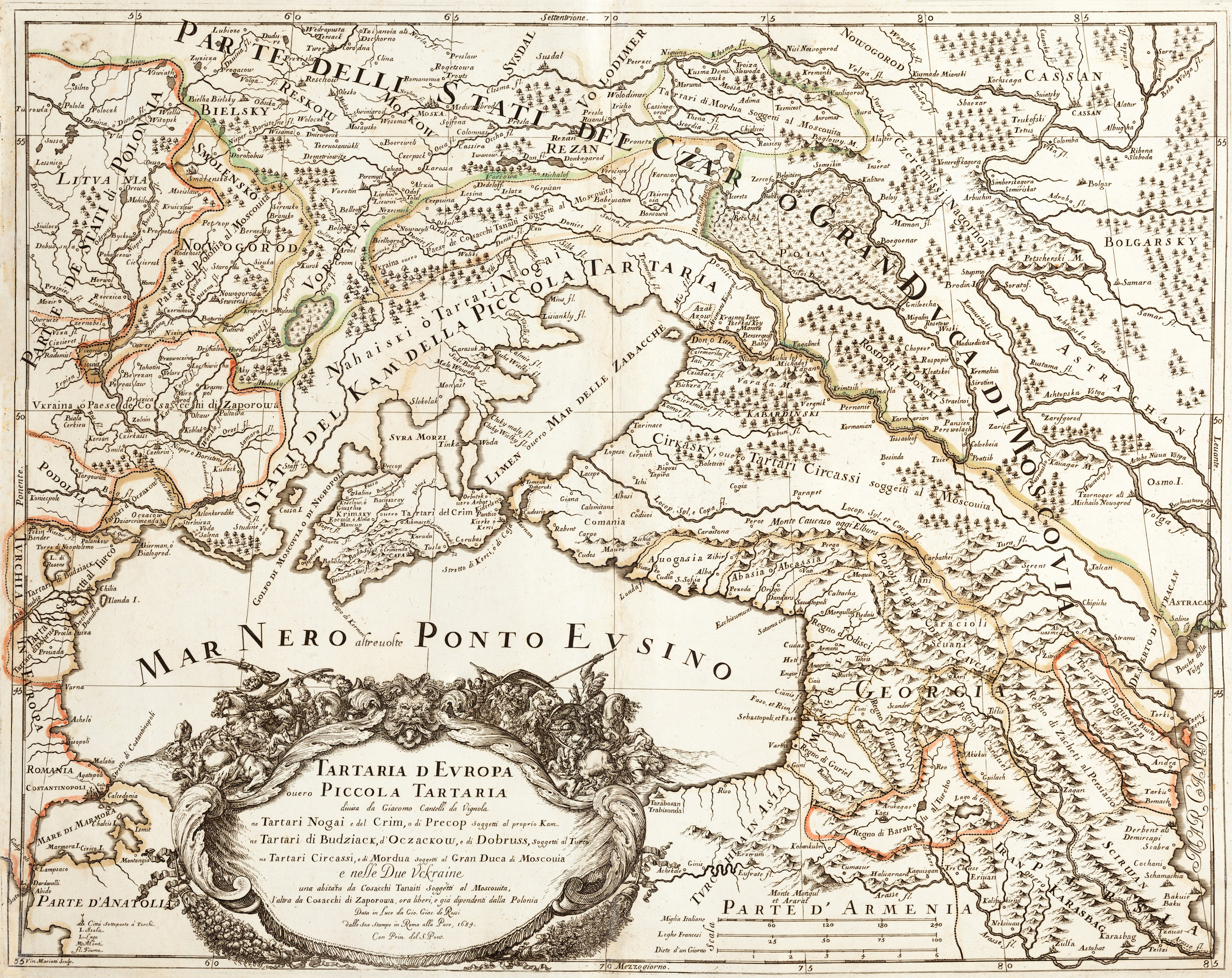
Map of the Russian, Tartar and Persian areas through which Joel Poinsett traveled while in Europe

Poinsett arrived in the Russian capital of Saint Petersburg in November 1806. Levett Harris, consul of the United States at Saint Petersburg, and the highest American official in the country, hoped to introduce Poinsett at court to Czar Alexander. Learning that Poinsett was from South Carolina, the Empress asked him if he would inspect the cotton factories under her patronage. Poinsett and Consul Harris traveled by sleigh to Kronstadt to see the factories. Poinsett made some suggestions on improvement, which the Dowager Empress accepted. Poinsett did not believe the cotton industry could be successful in Russia because of the necessity of employing serfs who received no compensation and therefore could have no interest in its prosperity. Furthermore, he believed that the institution of serfdom made it difficult for Russia to have a merchant marine or become industrialized.

In January 1807, Czar Alexander and Poinsett dined at the Palace. Czar Alexander attempted to entice Poinsett into the Russian civil or military service. Poinsett was hesitant, which prompted Alexander to advise him to "see the Empire, acquire the language, study the people", and then decide. Always interested in travel, Poinsett accepted the invitation and left Saint Petersburg in March 1807 on a journey through southern Russia. He was accompanied by his English friend Philip Yorke, Viscount Royston and eight others.

With letters recommending them to the special care of all Russian officials, Poinsett and Royston made their way to Moscow. They were among the last westerners to see Moscow before its burning in October 1812 by Napoleon's forces. From Moscow they traveled to the Volga River, and then by boat to Astrakhan, situated at the mouth of the river. Poinsett's company now entered the Caucasus, containing a very diverse population, and only recently acquired by Russia through conquests by Czars Peter the Great and Catherine the Great. Because of ethnic conflict, the area was extremely dangerous. They were provided with a Cossack escort as they traveled between Tarki and Derbent in Dagestan, but when a Tartar dignitary claimed that this would only provoke danger, the escort was bypassed for the security of the Tartar chiefs. This new security increased the numbers in Poinsett's company, which they believed made it less vulnerable to attack as it passed out of Russia proper. Thus, they were joined by a Persian merchant, who was transporting young girls he had acquired in Circassia to Baku, Azerbaijan and harems in Turkey. With a strong Persian and Kopak guard, the party left Derbent and entered the realm of the Khan of Kuban.

Armed Tartars on horses in 1813

While traveling through the Khanate, a tribal chief stole some of the horses in Poinsett's party. Poinsett boldly decided to go out of his way to the court of the Khan in the town of Kuban to demand their return. As there were normally never any foreigners in this place, the Khan was surprised. Of course, he had never heard of the United States, and Poinsett did the best he could to answer all the questions the Khan had. In order to convey the greatness of the U.S., Poinsett spoke at length on its geography. The Khan referred to President Thomas Jefferson as the Shah of America. Finally, Poinsett stated that the theft of his horses would reflect badly on the fair name of the Khanate. The Khan was impressed and told Poinsett that the head of the guilty chief was his for the asking, yet since the thief had made it possible for him to accept such a distinguished visitor, perhaps a pardon might be in order.

Poinsett's company traveled to Baku on the Caspian Sea. He noted that because of the petroleum pits in the region, it had long been a spot of pilgrimage for fire-worshipers. He became one of the earliest U.S. travelers to the Middle East, where, in 1806, the Persian khan showed him a pool of petroleum, which he speculated might someday be used for fuel.

Attracted by the military movements in the Caucasus Mountains, Poinsett visited Erivan, which was then besieged by the Russian Army. After a time with the troops, Poinsett and company journeyed through the mountains of Armenia to the Black Sea. Avoiding Constantinople because of conflict between Russia and the Ottoman Empire, the party proceeded to the Crimea, then through Ukraine, reaching Moscow late in 1807. The trip had been hazardous and Poinsett's health was much impaired. Furthermore, of the nine who had set out on the journey the previous March, Poinsett and two others were the only survivors.

Upon his return to Moscow, Czar Alexander discussed the details of Poinsett's trip with him and offered him a position as colonel in the Russian Army. However, news had reached Russia of the attack of the Chesapeake affair, and war between the United States and Great Britain seemed certain. Poinsett eagerly sought to return to his homeland.

Before leaving Russia, Poinsett met one last time with Czar Alexander. The Czar declared that Russia and the United States should maintain friendly relations. Poinsett again met with Foreign Minister Count Romanzoff where the Russian disclosed to Poinsett that the Czar ardently desired to have a minister from the United States at the Russian Court.

== Chile and Argentina ==
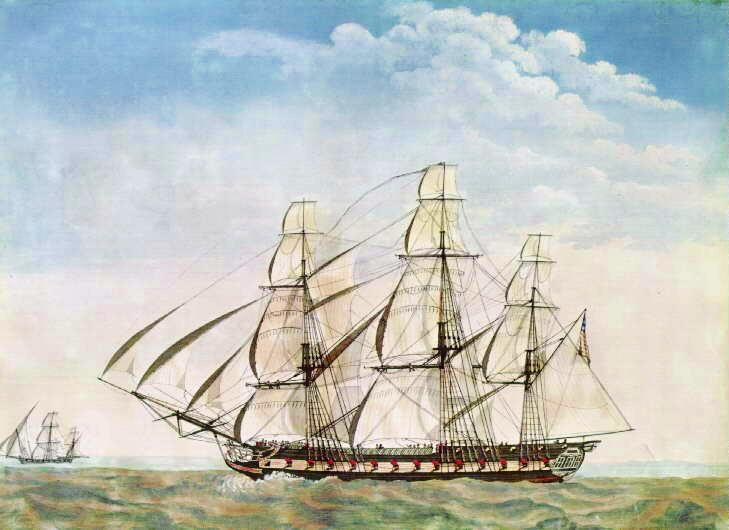
The United States Frigate Essex arrived in Valparaíso, Chile in September 1813 at which time Poinsett received the first official news of the War of 1812

He served as a "special agent" to two South American countries from 1810 to 1814, Chile and Argentina. President James Madison appointed him in 1809 as Consul in General. Poinsett was to investigate the prospects of the revolutionists, in their struggle for independence from Spain. On December 29, 1811, he reached Santiago. The Larrain and Carrera families were jockeying for power in Chile. By the time Poinsett arrived, the Carreras gained control under their leader, José Miguel Carrera. Carrera's government was split on how to receive Poinsett. The Tribunal del Consulado, the organization with jurisdiction over commercial matters opposed his reception on the grounds that his nomination had not been confirmed by the U.S. Senate. Moreover, many of the members of this group were royalists, hoping for closer relations with Spain or Britain. Nevertheless, Poinsett received recognition as a majority wanted to establish trade relations with the U.S.

The official reception finally occurred on February 24, 1812. Poinsett was the first accredited agent of a foreign government to reach Chile. Poinsett's main adversary in Chile was the junta of Peru. The Colonial Viceroy of Peru resented the Chileans' disregard for Spanish authority. He declared the laws of the new Chilean government relative to free commerce null and void and sent privateers to enforce the old colonial system. Seizure of ships and confiscation of cargoes followed, to the dismay of foreign traders, especially Americans. Poinsett learned of the seizure of an American whaler searching for supplies from an intercepted letter from the governor of San Carlos de Chiloe to the viceroy of Lima. Furthermore, he received intelligence that ten other American vessels were seized at Talcahuano in the Bay of Concepción. With little guidance from the Madison administration, Poinsett decided that something had to be done to halt violations of American neutral rights.

Poinsett urged Chile to close its ports to Peru, but the authorities in Santiago did not feel they were strong enough to take such a step. Instead they urged Poinsett to aid them in obtaining arms and supplies from the United States. Although Poinsett furnished the names of certain dealers, many of them were already too involved with the conflict between the U.S. and Britain to give any attention to the Chileans. During this time Poinsett also urged the Chileans to create a national constitution. A commission consisting of Camilo Henríquez and six others was named for the purpose of drawing up a constitution. The first meeting of the group was held at Poinsett's residence on July 11, 1812.

The seizure of American ships by royalist Peru continued. Poinsett's commission stated that he was to protect all American property and provide for American citizens. After a consultation with Carrera, Poinsett accepted a commission into the Chilean army to fight against the Spanish Royalists based in Peru. Poinsett was later given the rank of general in Carrera's army. He led a charge at the head of the Chilean cavalry in the Battle of San Carlos and secured a victory for Chile. From there, he went with a battery of flying artillery to the Bay of Concepción, where ten American vessels had been seized. He arrived at dark near the seaport of Talcahuano, and began firing on the town. At dawn he sent an emissary to demand the surrender of the bay to the Junta of Chile. The Peruvian royalists surrendered on May 29, 1813.

In early September 1813, the United States Frigate Essex arrived in Chilean waters, forcibly seizing the British whalers in the area. When Commodore David Porter of the U.S.S. Essex arrived in Santiago, Poinsett received the first authoritative news of the War of 1812. He now desired more than ever to return to his home. However, this could not happen until Commodore Porter completed his cruise of the Pacific. Finally, as the Essex set out with Poinsett aboard, the British frigates HMS Phoebe and HMS Cherub were spotted in the port of Valparaiso. Commodore Porter returned to Santiago to utilize the guns of the fort there. After waiting six weeks, Porter decided to launch a desperate breakout but was easily defeated by Captain James Hillyar of the Phoebe. The British decided to send their American prisoners of war back to the United States in a cartel. Poinsett was forced to stay behind in Chile.

When Poinsett returned to Buenos Aires, he found a Junta that was very well established. He managed to negotiate a commercial agreement with the Junta by which American articles of general consumption were admitted free of duty. As American shipping had been driven from the South Atlantic, it took some time to find passage back to the United States. Poinsett finally secured passage aboard a vessel going to Bahia, a state in the northeastern part of Brazil. From there he transferred to another ship bound for the Madeira Islands, located 535 miles from mainland Europe. Poinsett finally reached Charleston on May 28, 1815.

== Return to the U.S. ==
Returning to Charleston in 1815, Poinsett spent the first few months putting his personal affairs in order. From then until 1825 Poinsett stayed in South Carolina seeking to build a reputation in his home state, and hold office. Yet, he came to be respected as an authority on Latin American affairs. In 1816 Poinsett received a letter from his old friend General Jose Miguel Carrera.

Since Poinsett's departure, the Chilean Royalists had consolidated their hold on Chile, and after spending a year in exile in the provinces of the Río de la Plata, Carrera came to the United States in January 1816 to stimulate interest for a revolution in Chile. Poinsett wrote Carrera back stating that he intended to urge the U.S. government to develop decisive policy regarding the Spanish colonies. President James Madison received General Carrera warmly, but never offered him any official encouragement because he worried that seriously entertaining Carrera might jeopardize gaining Florida that was under Spanish rule. Carrera's only hope of help came from his former comrade.

In July 1816, Poinsett traveled to New York to meet Carrera. While there, Poinsett attempted to interest John Jacob Astor, the wealthy owner of the American Fur Company, in supplying Carrera's Chilean revolutionists with weapons; however, Astor declined to get involved. In August 1816, Poinsett was able to arrange some conferences in Philadelphia between the Chilean leader and some of Napoleon's former officers. Among them were Marshal de Grouchy who had commanded Napoleon's body guards during the Russian Campaign. Poinsett also arranged a meeting between Carrera and General Bertrand Count Clausel. Clausel had distinguished himself in the Napoleonic Wars and was given the distinction of Peer of France by Napoleon in 1815. Although Carrera's movement never benefited from the experience of these French officers, Poinsett did succeed in obtaining contracts with the firm D'Arcy and Didier of Philadelphia to supply arms for the expedition which Carrera was planning.

On August 29, 1816, Poinsett, along with four free men and one enslaved man from Charleston, set out from Philadelphia on a tour of the western United States. They made stops in Pittsburgh and Cincinnati, before stopping in Lexington, Kentucky. While in Lexington, the group stayed with Congressman Henry Clay. It is possible that in relating his experiences in Chile, Poinsett may have made quite an impression on Clay, who would distinguish himself as the biggest American supporter for Spanish American independence in the next few years. From Lexington, the travelers made their way to Louisville, and then on to Nashville, Tennessee. While in Nashville, Poinsett and his companions had breakfast with Andrew Jackson. Poinsett, after traversing more than two thousand miles, finally returned to Charleston in early November 1816.

== Political career ==
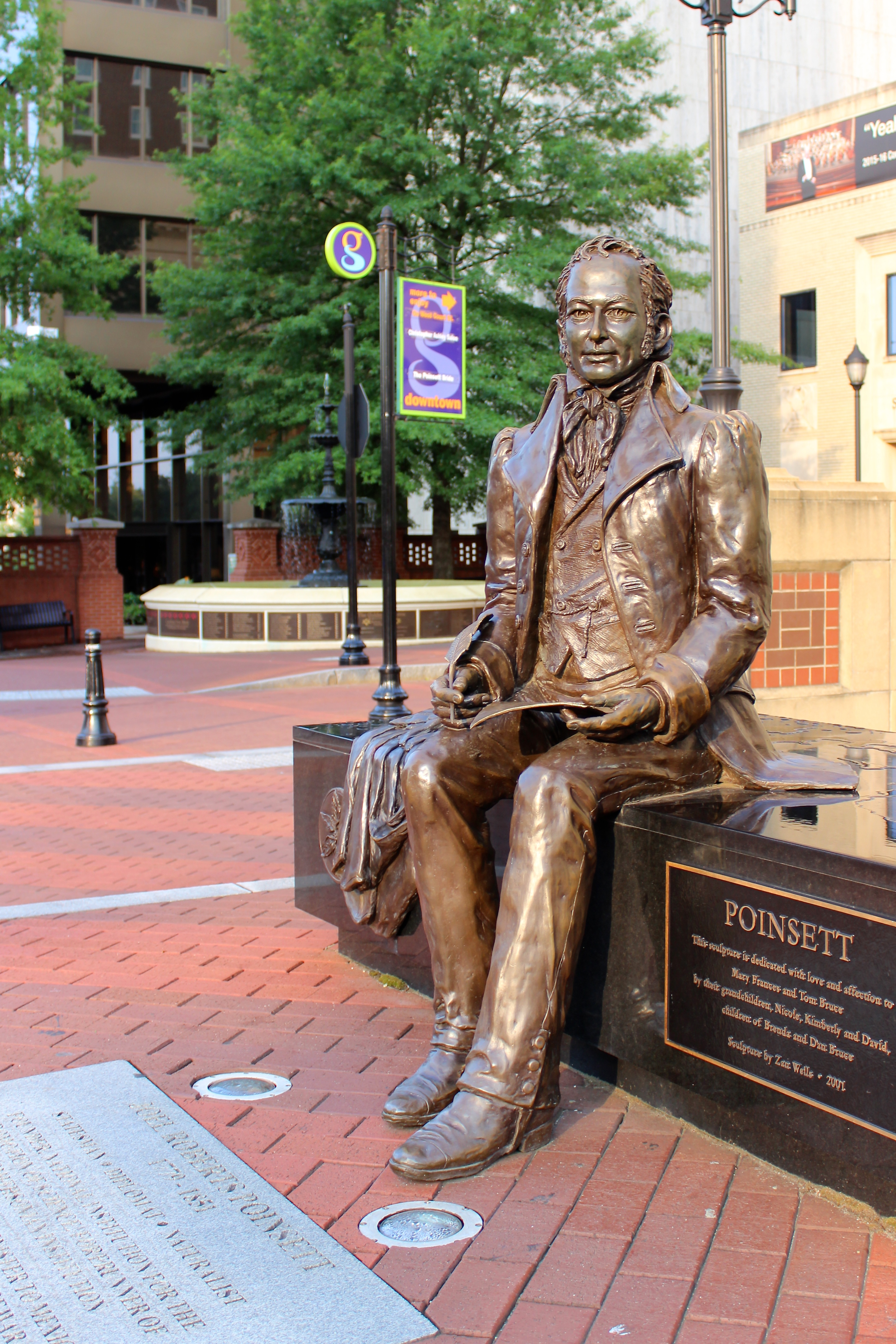
Statue of Joel Poinsett by Zan Wells (2001), Greenville, South Carolina.

Poinsett was aware that his friends had nominated him to represent Charleston, South Carolina, in the state legislature. In Greenville on his way back home, he learned that he had won the nomination and had a seat in the State House of Representatives. As he was beginning his first term in April 1817, the rumored position of American envoy to South America became reality. On April 25, 1817, acting Secretary of State Robert Rush offered Poinsett the position of special commissioner to South America stating, "No one has better qualifications for this trust than yourself." Rush also added that he would be personally gratified by Poinsett's acceptance.

Nevertheless, Poinsett declined the honor. In May, Poinsett explained to President James Monroe that he had recently accepted a seat in the legislature of South Carolina and could not resign it "without some more important motive than this commission presents." Poinsett perceived that the mission would not lead to any substantial decision for recognition and was unwilling to give up his seat in the House. In the same letter, Poinsett offered his knowledge of South America to the service of whomever the Monroe administration appointed.

Poinsett's political values mirrored those of others at the time who considered themselves Jeffersonian Republicans. One of the most important measures supported by Jeffersonian Republicans following the War of 1812 was that of federally funded internal improvements. As a member of the state legislature, this was one of Poinsett's passions. After being re-elected to the South Carolina House in 1818, he became a member of the Committee on Internal Improvements and Waterways.

Poinsett also served on the South Carolina Board of Public Works as president. One of the main plans of this board was to link the interior of the state with the seaboard. Another important project was the construction of a highway from Charleston through Columbia, to the northwestern border of South Carolina. It was designed to promote interstate commerce as well as to draw commerce from eastern Tennessee and western North Carolina to Charleston. Poinsett, a seasoned traveler, knew better than anyone the importance of good roadways. Through his journeys in New England in 1804 and especially to the west in 1816, Poinsett understood that his country could benefit from transportation facilities.

=== Election to Congress ===
In 1820, Poinsett won a seat in the United States House of Representatives for the Charleston district. As a congressman, Poinsett continued to call for internal improvements, but he also advocated the maintenance of a strong army and navy. In December 1823, Poinsett submitted a resolution calling upon the Committee on Naval Affairs to inquire into the expediency of authorizing the construction of ten additional sloops of war. As a member of the Committee on Foreign Affairs, Poinsett took strong views on developments in South America. Poinsett's political views were aligned with such nationalists as Secretary of State John Quincy Adams and Secretary of War John C. Calhoun. Poinsett, like many opponents of Clay's American system, opposed the Tariff of 1824.

=== First Minister to Mexico ===
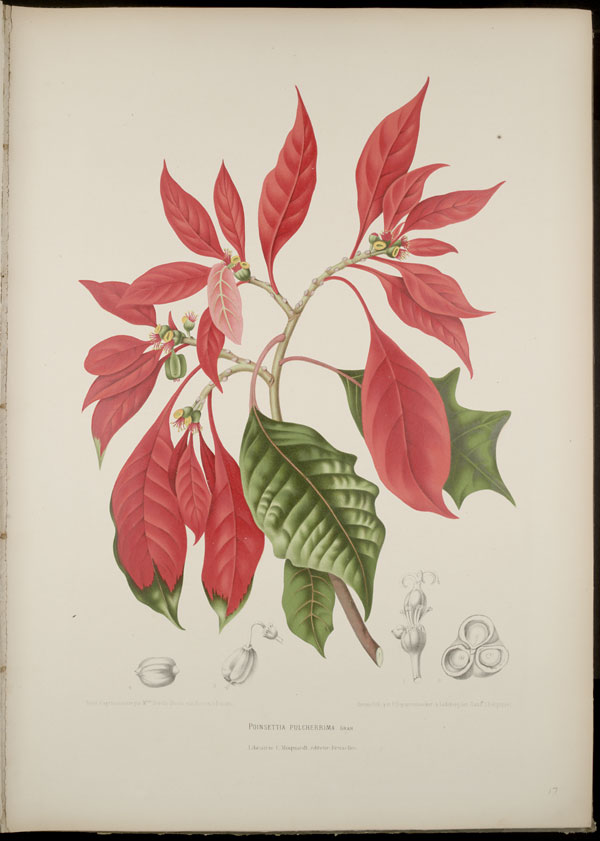
The poinsettia, which takes its name from Poinsett.

Poinsett simultaneously served as a special envoy to Mexico from 1822 to 1823, when the government of James Monroe became concerned about the stability of newly independent Mexico. Poinsett, a supporter of the Monroe Doctrine, was convinced that republicanism was the only guarantee of a peaceful, free form of government for North American countries, and tried to influence the government of Agustín de Iturbide, which was beginning to show signs of weakness and divisiveness. The U.S. recognized Mexican independence but it was not until 1825 and the establishment of the Mexican Republic that it sent a minister plenipotentiary. Andrew Jackson and several others turned down the appointment, but Poinsett accepted and resigned his congressional seat.

In 1825, Poinsett used his position to orchestrate what some historians believe was United States' first "soft" coup in Latin America. He weaponized his connection with the York Rite Masonic lodges to force the president Guadalupe Victoria to purge his cabinet of allies like Alamán. Ultimately, Poinsett's intervention succeeded in installing a pliant Mexican government, which gave up some of its more ambitious plans such as sending a naval expedition to liberate Cuba and Puerto Rico from Spain.

On January 12, 1828, in Mexico City, Poinsett signed the first treaty between the United States and Mexico, the Treaty of Limits, a treaty that recognized the U.S.-Mexico border established by the 1819 Adams–Onís Treaty between Spain and the U.S. Because some U.S. political leaders were dissatisfied with the Treaty of Limits and the Adams–Onís Treaty, Poinsett was sent to negotiate acquisition of new territories for the United States, including Texas, New Mexico, and Upper California, as well as parts of Lower California, Sonora, Coahuila, and Nuevo León; but Poinsett's offer to purchase these areas was rejected by the Mexican Ministry of Foreign Affairs headed by Juan Francisco de Azcárate. (Poinsett wrote Notes on Mexico, a memoir of his time in the First Mexican Empire and at the court of Agustín de Iturbide.)

He became embroiled in the country's political turmoil until his recall in 1830, but he did try to further U.S. interests in Mexico by seeking preferential treatment of U.S. goods over those of Britain, attempting to shift the U.S.–Mexico boundary, and urging the adoption of a constitution patterned on that of the U.S.

After visiting an area south of Mexico City near Taxco de Alarcón, Poinsett saw what later became known in the United States as the poinsettia. (In Mexico it is called Flor de Nochebuena, Christmas Eve flower, or Catarina). Poinsett, an avid amateur botanist, sent samples of the plant to the United States, and by 1836 the plant was widely known as the "poinsettia". Also a species of Mexican lizard, Sceloporus poinsettii, is named in Poinsett's honor.

=== Unionist ===
Although Poinsett was a proponent of the slave system and owned slaves, including those who provided forced labor on his plantation in South Carolina, he returned to South Carolina in 1830 to support the Unionist position during the Nullification Crisis, again serving in the South Carolina state legislature (1830–1831). Poinsett also became a confidential agent of President Andrew Jackson, keeping Jackson abreast of situation in South Carolina between October 1832 and March 1833.

=== Secretary of War ===
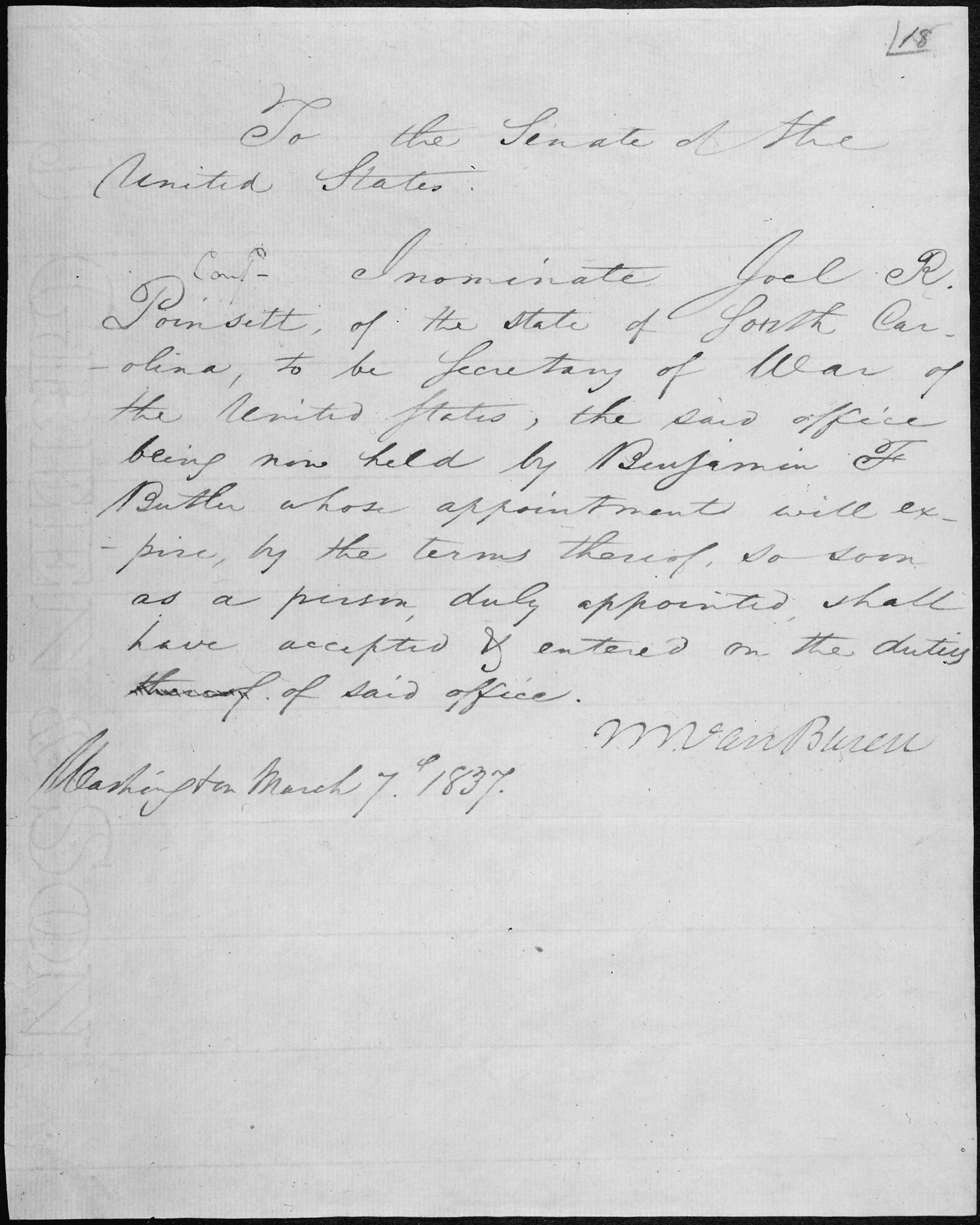
Message of President Martin Van Buren nominating Joel Poinsett to be Secretary of War, March 7, 1837.

Poinsett served as Secretary of War from March 7, 1837, to March 5, 1841, overseeing the forced ethnic cleansing and dispossession of land from Native Americans to European settlers known as the Trail of Tears. He also presided over attacks on Native Americans and armed territorial seizures from Native Americans west of the Mississippi and during the Seminole War; reduced the fragmentation of the army by concentrating elements at central locations; equipped the light batteries of artillery regiments as authorized by the 1821 army organization act; and again retired to his plantation at Georgetown, South Carolina, in 1841.

== Personal life ==
=== Marriage ===
In 1833, Poinsett married the widow Mary Izard Pringle (1780–1857), daughter of Ralph and Elizabeth (Stead) Izard.

=== Promotion of American Arts ===
During the 1820s, Poinsett was a member of the prestigious society, the Columbian Institute for the Promotion of Arts and Sciences, who counted among their members former presidents Andrew Jackson and John Quincy Adams and many prominent men of the day, including well-known representatives of the military, government service, medical and other professions. He was elected a fellow of the American Academy of Arts and Sciences in 1825 and as a member of the American Philosophical Society in 1827.

In 1840 he was a cofounder of the National Institute for the Promotion of Science and the Useful Arts, a group of politicians advocating for the use of the "Smithson bequest" for a national museum that would showcase relics of the country and its leaders, celebrate American technology, and document the national resources of North America. The group was defeated in its efforts, as other groups wanted scientists, rather than political leaders, guiding the fortunes of what would become the Smithsonian Institution.

=== Freemasonry ===
It is unknown when Poinsett became a Master Mason, but it is known that he was a Past Master of Recovery Lodge #31, Greenville, and Solomon's Lodge, Charleston. Poinsett played a prominent role in defining Freemasonry in Mexico; he favoured promoting the York Rite, which was allied to the political interests of the United States. This became one of three strands, the other to being allied to Continental Freemasonry and the other an "independent" National Mexican Rite.

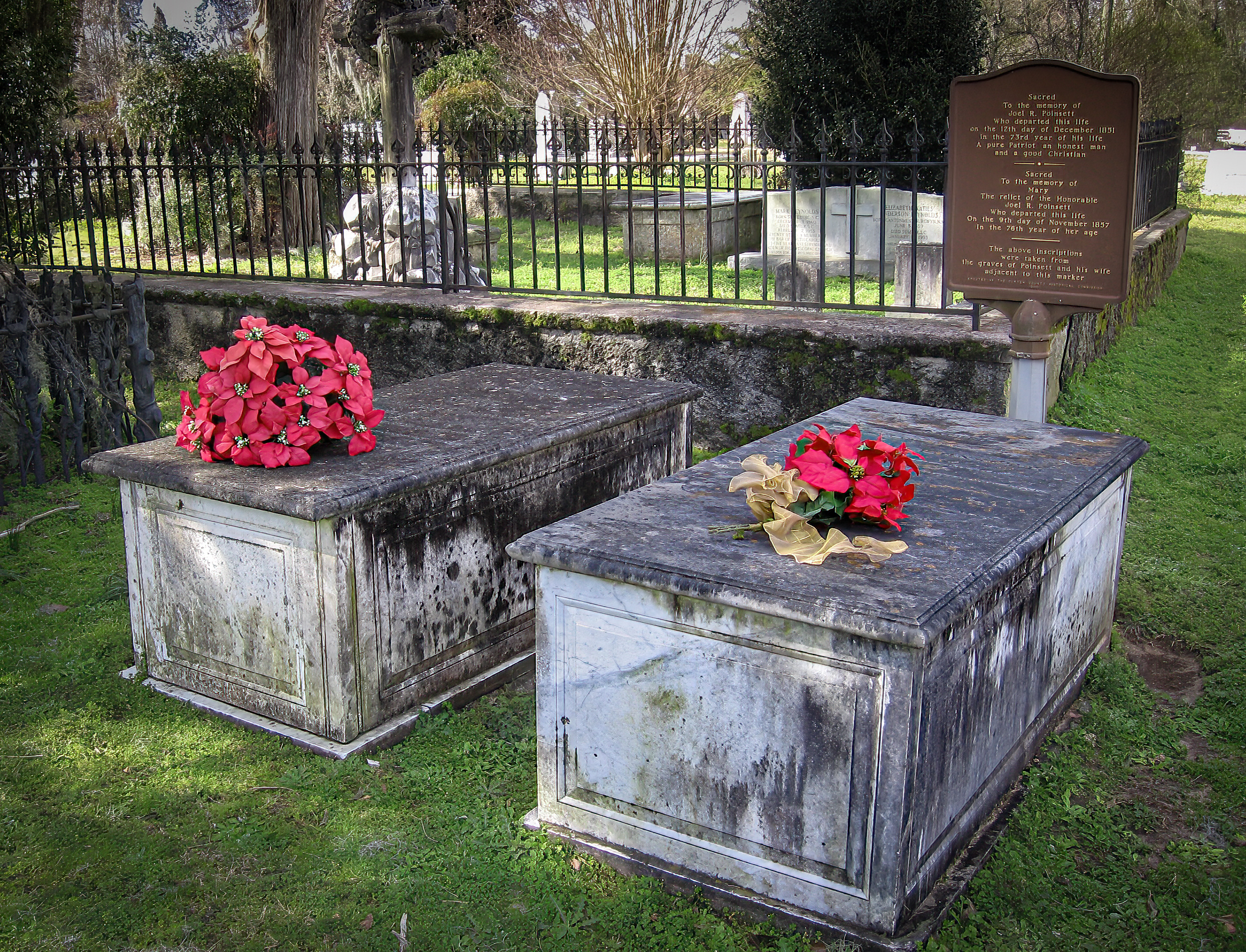
The graves of Joel & Mary Poinsett in Stateburg, SC

== Later life ==
He died of tuberculosis, hastened by an attack of pneumonia, in Stateburg, South Carolina, in 1851, and is buried at the Church of the Holy Cross Episcopal Cemetery.

== See also ==
- Treaty of Limits (Mexico–United States)

U.S. House of Representatives
Preceded by Charles Pinckney	Member of the U.S. House of Representatives from South Carolina's 1st congressional district 1821–1825	Succeeded by William Drayton
Political offices
Preceded by Lewis Cass	U.S. Secretary of War; Served under: Martin Van Buren; 1837–1841	Succeeded by John Bell
Diplomatic posts
Preceded by James Wilkinson	U.S. Minister to Mexico; 1825–1829	Succeeded by Anthony Butler; Acting
