= Barnard E. Bee Sr. =

American attorney and politician (1787–1853)

Barnard Elliot Bee Sr. (1787–1853) was an American attorney and politician. A native of South Carolina, he, with his family, was an early settler of the Republic of Texas. He became a political leader there, serving in several political-appointee positions in the republic. He was also the father of Confederate general, Barnard E. Bee Jr

== Early life and education ==
Barnard Bee was born in Charleston, South Carolina, one of several siblings, the son of Thomas Bee and Susannah (Bulline) Bee, both of planter families. His father was a delegate to the Continental Congress and a US Congressman. Barnard studied law, and became an attorney.

== Marriage and family ==
Bee married Ann Wragg Fayssoux of Charleston, from a prominent Anglo-French family. Her father's line was of French Huguenot descent. They had two sons, Hamilton Prioleau Bee (b. 1822) and Barnard E. Bee Jr. (b. 1824). Hamilton Bee followed his father into politics, serving first in the Republic of Texas Senate in 1846. He was elected to the Texas Legislature in 1849 and served for more than 10 years; in 1855, he was elected as speaker of the house. Both sons served in the Confederate Army as generals during the American Civil War. Barnard Bee Jr. was one of the first Confederate general officers to be killed in the war.

== Political career ==
Bee served on the staff of his brother-in-law, James Hamilton Jr., governor of South Carolina from 1830 to 1832.

In 1836, Bee moved his family to Texas and took part in the Texas Revolution. He settled near Houston. Bee served the young republic in a number of political offices: as secretary of the treasury in 1836, secretary of war from 1837–1838, and secretary of state from 1839-1839. In 1839, Texas sent him as an agent to negotiate permanent peace and borders with Mexico. His offers were rejected. He began his return by sailing to Cuba, then obtained passage to Washington, DC.

The Texas government appointed him as minister (ambassador) to the United States. He served in that post from April 20, 1840, to December 13, 1841. He negotiated with Daniel Webster and settled the formal treaty by which the United States recognized Texas.

== Later years ==
After his return to Texas, Bee generally took up a private life again. Strongly opposed to the annexation of Texas into the United States, afterward he returned to South Carolina. He died there in 1853, and is buried in St Paul's Churchyard in Pendleton, South Carolina.

== Legacy and honors ==
- Bee County and the city of Beeville in Texas are named in his honor.
- His grandson Carlos Bee was elected and served as a US Congressman from Texas.
