= Richard Hutson =

American Founding Father and politician

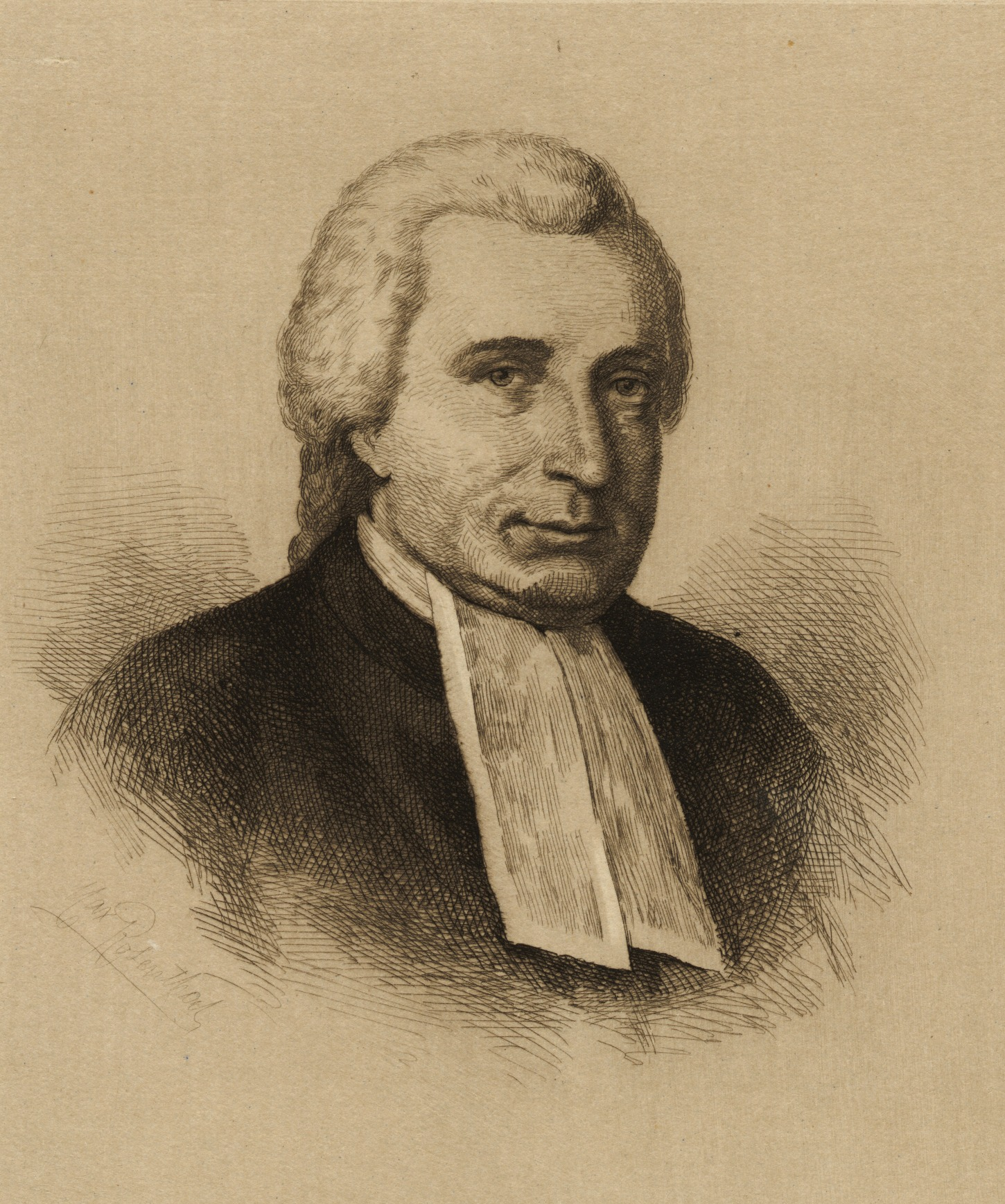

8th Lieutenant Governor of South Carolina
- In office January 31, 1782 – February 4, 1783
- Governor: John Matthews
- Preceded by: Christopher Gadsden
- Succeeded by: Richard Beresford

1st Mayor of Charleston
- In office 1783–1785
- Preceded by: Office Established
- Succeeded by: Arnoldus Vanderhorst

Personal details
- Born: July 9, 1748 Charleston, South Carolina, British America
- Died: April 12, 1795 Charleston, South Carolina, U.S.

Richard Hutson (July 9, 1748 – April 12, 1795) was a Founding Father of the United States and an American lawyer, judge, politician, and planter from Charleston, South Carolina. He was born in June 1747 to Rev. William Hutson and Mary Hutson (née Woodward). His family moved to Charleston in 1756 when his father was the pastor at the Circular Congregational Church. After having been educated in Charleston as a child, he attended Princeton.

In 1778 and 1779 he represented South Carolina as a delegate to the Continental Congress, where he signed the Articles of Confederation. After the British captured Charleston in May 1780, he was held as a prisoner at St. Augustine, Florida until July 1781. After he returned home, he served as the eighth lieutenant governor of South Carolina under Governor John Mathews in 1782 and 1783. On September 11, 1783, Hutson was elected the first intendant (mayor) of Charleston. He was re-elected on September 13, 1784, winning against Alexander Gillon by a vote of 387 to 127. After his time as intendant of Charleston, he was one of the first three chancellors of the Court of Equity of South Carolina.

He is buried in a vault at the Independent Congregational (Circular) Churchyard in Charleston.

Political offices
Preceded by Christopher Gadsden	Lieutenant Governor of South Carolina; 1782–1783	Succeeded by Richard Beresford
Preceded by None	Mayor of Charleston, South Carolina; 1783–1785	Succeeded by Arnoldus Vanderhorst
