= William S. Taylor (American politician, born 1795) =

American politician (1795–1858)

William S. Taylor (1795–1858) was an American politician who served in the Alabama, Mississippi, and Texas State Legislatures, and was Speaker of the Texas House of Representatives briefly in the Seventh Texas Legislature. Taylor, at 62, is the oldest person to assume the office of Speaker of the Texas House.

Taylor was born in Georgia in late 1795. After moving to Alabama, Taylor enlisted and fought in the First Seminole War and Second Seminole War, serving as a captain in the latter. He was appointed brigadier general of the Alabama State Militia in 1841, and thereafter was always known as General William S. Taylor.

From 1836 to 1842, Taylor represented Fayette County, Alabama, in the Alabama Legislature in the Fifteenth through the Twenty-first, and Twenty-third Alabama Legislatures. By 1844, Taylor had moved to Tippah County, Mississippi where he served as a member of the Mississippi House of Representatives. In April 1847, Taylor and family moved to Larissa, Texas (ten miles northeast of Rusk) in Cherokee County. In 1855, Taylor was elected to the Sixth Texas Legislature for the first of two terms to the Texas House of Representatives, where he represented Cherokee and Anderson counties.

When the Seventh Legislature convened on 2 November 1857, Taylor was the only nomination for speaker. He was elected and served until he became ill on 26 December 1857 and took leave of absence. On 18 January 1858, Taylor resigned as Speaker. Taylor died on 22 July 1858 and was buried in Larissa. One of his fifteen children with wife Elizabeth, son William S. Taylor, Jr., fought in the Battle of San Jacinto.

== Notes ==
Preceded by Unknown	Member of the Texas House of Representatives; 1855 – 22 July 1858	Succeeded by Unknown
Preceded by Hamilton P. Bee	Speaker of the Texas House of Representatives; 2 November 1857 – 18 January 1858	Succeeded by Matthew Fielding Locke
