= 10th Texas Cavalry Regiment =

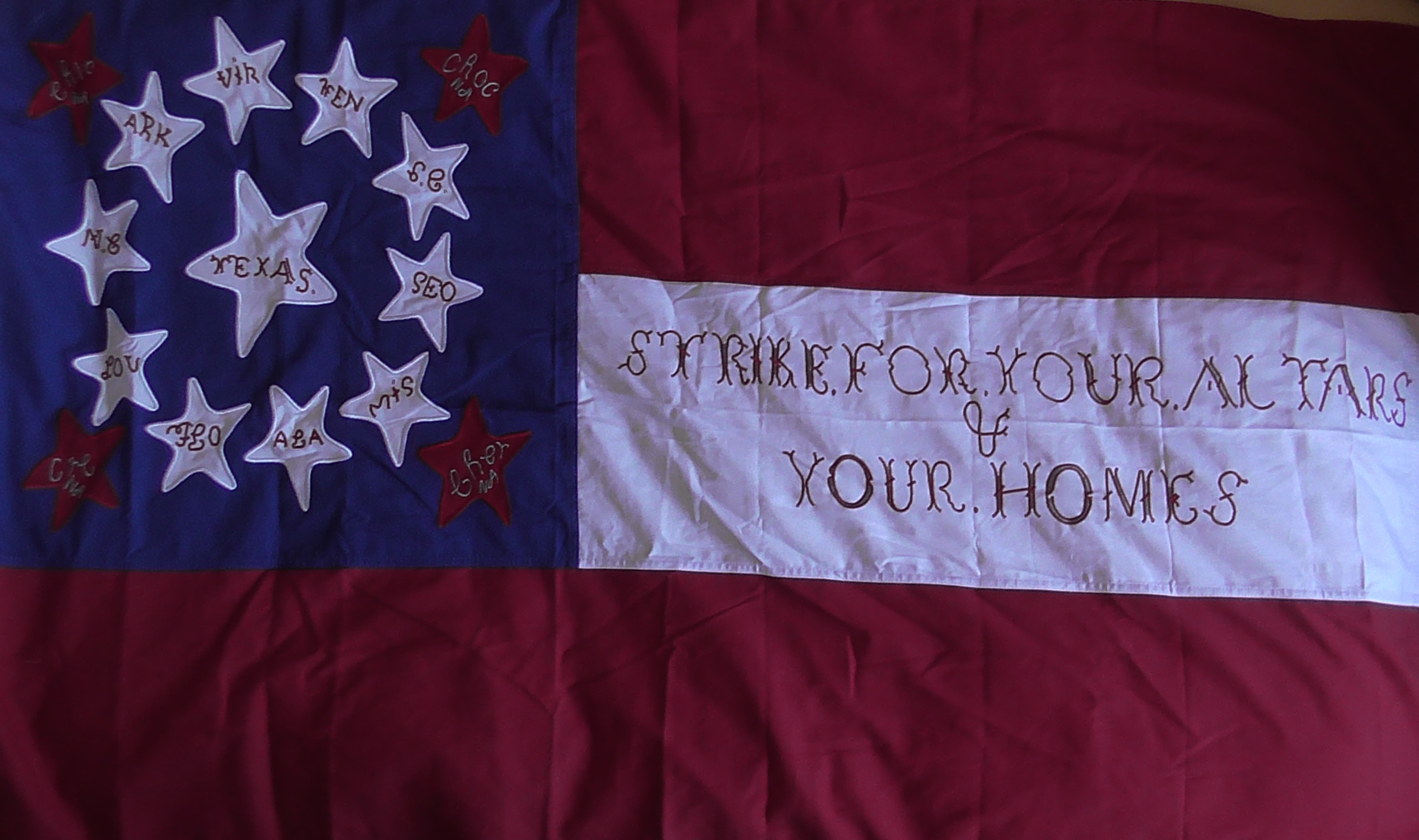
- The standard of the 10th Texas Cavalry Regiment
- Active: October 1861 – 4 May 1865
- Country: Confederate States of America
- Allegiance: Confederate States of America; Texas
- Branch: Confederate States Army
- Type: Cavalry, Infantry
- Size: Regiment
- Equipment: Rifled musket
- Engagements: American Civil War; Siege of Corinth (1862); Battle of Richmond (1862); Battle of Stones River (1862–63); Battle of Chickamauga (1863); Meridian campaign (1864); Atlanta campaign (1864); Battle of Nashville (1864); Battle of Spanish Fort (1865); Battle of Fort Blakeley (1865)

Commanders
- Notable commanders: Matthew Fielding Locke

The 10th Texas Cavalry Regiment was a unit of mounted volunteers in the Confederate States Army which fought during the American Civil War. The regiment mustered as cavalry in October 1861 but was dismounted in April 1862 and served as infantry for the rest of the war. The regiment was present at the Siege of Corinth, and fought at Richmond, Ky., Stones River, and Chickamauga in 1862–1863, in the Meridian and Atlanta campaigns and at Nashville in 1864, and at Spanish Fort and Fort Blakeley in 1865. The remaining 65 members of the regiment surrendered to Federal forces on 4 May 1865.

== See also ==
- List of Texas Civil War Confederate units
