= Carlos Bee (California politician) =

American politician

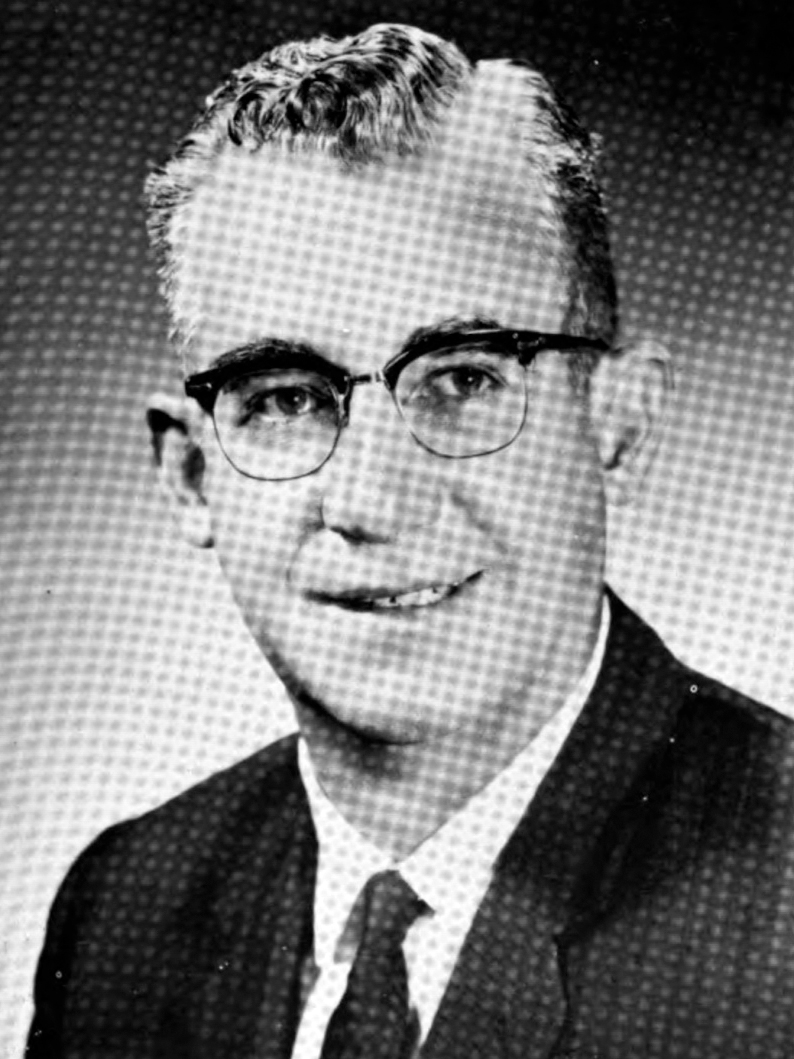
- Official portrait, 1963

Member of the California State Assembly
- In office January 3, 1955 – November 29, 1974
- Preceded by: Francis Dunn Jr.
- Succeeded by: S. Floyd Mori
- Constituency: 13th district (1955–1973); 15th district (1973–1974)

Mayor of Hayward, California
- In office 1952–1954

Personal details
- Born: May 5, 1917 Berkeley, California, U.S.
- Died: November 29, 1974 (aged 57) San Antonio, Texas, U.S.
- Party: Democratic
- Spouse: Jean Anderson (m. 1946)
- Children: 5
- Parent: Carlos Bee (father)
- Relatives: Bee family
- Education: Santa Barbara State College (bachelor's degree, 1940)

Carlos Bee (May 5, 1917 – November 29, 1974) was an American Democratic Party politician from California who served in multiple offices, most notably speaker pro tempore in the California State Assembly.

== Early life ==
Born in Berkeley, California, Bee came from a political family the son of U.S. Representative Carlos Bee from Texas and grandson of Hamilton P. Bee, who was Speaker of the Texas House of Representatives from 1855 to 1856. After graduating from South Pasadena High School in South Pasadena, California the younger Bee graduated from Santa Barbara State College (now University of California, Santa Barbara) in 1940.

== Career ==
After graduating from college, Bee worked as a high school teacher in Hayward, California, for 12 years. From 1948 to 1954, Bee served on the Hayward City Council, serving as mayor from 1952 to 1954. Bee won his first election to the California State Assembly in 1954. He was first sworn in to the Assembly on January 3, 1955.

During his tenure in the Assembly, Bee served on the Rules Committee as well as the Committees on Intergovernmental Relations, Retirement, and Transportation. Bee introduced a bill to establish the California State College at Hayward (now California State University, East Bay); Governor Goodwin Knight signed the bill into law on July 5, 1957.

From 1959 to 1968, and 1971 to 1974, he served as speaker pro tempore in the California State Assembly.

Nearly three weeks after winning reelection, Bee died in San Antonio, Texas, on November 29, 1974. He was 57. Carlos Bee Boulevard in Hayward adjacent to Cal State East Bay and Carlos Bee Park in Castro Valley are named after him.
