= 7th Texas Legislature =

The 7th Texas Legislature met from November 2, 1857, to February 16, 1858, in its regular session. All members of the House of Representatives and about half of the members of the Senate were elected in 1857.

== Sessions ==
- 7th Regular session: November 2, 1857 – February 16, 1858

== Officers ==
=== Senate ===
Lieutenant Governor
Francis Richard Lubbock, Democrat
President pro tempore
M. D. K. Taylor, Democrat, Regular session
Samuel A. Maverick, Democrat, Ad interim

=== House of Representatives ===
Speaker of the House
William S. Taylor, Democrat, 1857–18 January 1858
Matthew Fielding Locke, Democrat, 18 January 1858–1859

== Members ==
Members of the Seventh Texas Legislature at the beginning of the regular session, November 2, 1857:

=== Senate ===
District	Senator	Party	Took office
1	Solomon H. Pirkey	Democrat	1855
2	Johnson Wren	Democrat	1853
3	Robert H. Taylor	Democrat	1855
4	James W. Throckmorton	Democrat	1857
5	Albert G. Walker	Democrat	1857 (First time: 1849–1851)
6	Jonathan Russell	Democrat	1855
7	M. D. K. Taylor	Democrat	1851
8	Louis T. Wigfall	Democrat	1857
9	Malcolm D. Graham	Democrat	1857
10	Elisha Everett Lott	Democrat	1853
11	Robert Henry Guinn	Democrat	1853
12	William M. Taylor	Democrat	1855
13	John N. Fall	Democrat	1857
14	James A. Truitt	Democrat	1855 (First time: 1851–1853)
15	James M. Burroughs	Democrat	1855
16	Henry C. Pedigo	Democrat	1853
17	Mark M. Potter	Democrat	1851
18	Hiram George Runnels	Democrat	1857
19	Jesse Grimes	Democrat	1855 (First time: 1846–1853)
20	Chauncey Berkeley Shepard	Democrat	1857
21	Elliot McNeil Millican	Democrat	1853
22	William Harrison "Howdy" Martin	Democrat	1853
23	George Bernard Erath	Democrat	1857
24	George E. Quinan	Democrat	1857
25	John Caldwell	Democrat	1855
26	Fletcher S. Stockdale	Democrat	1857
27	Henry Eustace McCulloch	Democrat	1855
28	Edwin B. Scarborough	Democrat	1853
29	Forbes Britton	Democrat	1857
30	Isaiah Addison Paschal	Democrat	1857 (First time: 1853–1855)
31	Samuel A. Maverick	Democrat	1855
32	Claiborne C. Herbert	Democrat	1857
33	Archibald C. Hyde	Democrat	1857

=== House of Representatives ===
- Hamilton P. Bee
- John Henry Brown
- Constantine W. Buckley
- James G. Collier, Tyler County
- Isaac N. Dennis
- David Catchings Dickson
- Randolph C. Doom
- Horatio White Fisher
- Lindsay Hagler, San Patricio County
- James Marshall Harrison
- John L. Haynes
- Spearman Holland
- Pleasant Williams Kittrell
- Matthew Fielding Locke, Democrat
- Eli T. Merriman
- José Ángel Navarro
- Anthony Banning Norton
- Moses Fisk Roberts
- William R. Shannon, Democrat
- Charles William Tait
- William S. Taylor, Democrat
- Benjamin F. Carroll

== Membership Changes ==
=== Senate ===
District	Outgoing Senator	Reason for Vacancy	Successor	Date of Successor's Installation
District 18	Hiram George Runnels	Runnells did not appear and died on December 17, 1857.	Benjamin F. Tankersly	January 20, 1858
District 21	Elliot McNeil Millican	McNeill resigned before the session.	David M. Whaley	January 12, 1858

=== House of Representatives ===
District	Outgoing Member	Reason for Vacancy	Successor	Date of Successor's Installation
Unknown	William S. Taylor	Taylor died on July 22, 1858.	Unknown	after July 22, 1858
