= Drayton Island Ferry =

Automobile ferry in Florida, US

Coordinates: 29°23′09″N 81°38′17″W

- Waterway: St. Johns River
- Transit type: Barge
- Carries: Automobiles
- Began operation: 1943
- Route ID: 764040 / 764041

The Drayton Island Ferry is an auto ferry that crosses the St. Johns River in Putnam County, Florida, connecting Georgetown on the eastern bank with Drayton Island, located in the middle of the river at the north end of Lake George. It provides the only public access to the island.

== History ==
The Drayton Island Ferry provides the only access for vehicles to Drayton Island. Residents of the island petitioned for the establishment of a ferry service in 1939; operations began in 1943. The original ferry barge sank at its moorings on January 12, 1956; although it was salvaged and returned to service, a replacement, measuring 48 feet (15 m) by 18 feet (5.5 m), was acquired from J.H. Coppedge and Co. in Jacksonville for $6,793. A safety inspection of the ferry was carried out in 1963 after reports were received that 40 people had been carried on some trips; the ferry's passenger limit was set at six.

In 1968 the ferry received an $1800 subsidy from Putnam County for its operations; overall the ferry had cost $4129 to the county to operate over the previous year, while in 1965 it had produced $2,267 in toll revenue. Repairs to the ferry landing were proposed in the early 1980s, with a proposal for the establishment of a special taxing district to provide funding, but were rejected as unneeded; questions were raised about the financial management of the operation at the time.

== Operations ==
The ferry is currently operated by Putnam County, Florida; capable of transporting two vehicles per trip, there is a $9 toll for passage to the privately owned island. The ferry, which consists of a tugboat and barge combination, is located near daymarker No. 70 on the river. It nominally runs three times daily; however, the schedule is considered flexible.
