= Hamilton P. Bee =

American politician (1822–1897)

Hamilton Prioleau Bee
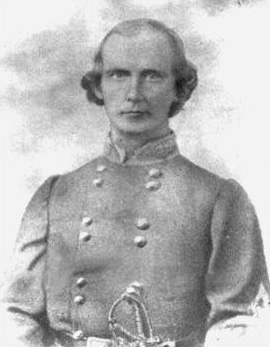
- Born: July 22, 1822; Charleston, South Carolina, US
- Died: October 3, 1897 (aged 75); San Antonio, Texas, US
- Burial place: Confederate Cemetery, San Antonio, Texas
- Military career
- Allegiance: United States; Confederate States of America
- Branch: US Army; Confederate States Army
- Service years: 1846–1848 (USA); 1862–1865 (CSA)
- Rank: First Lieutenant (USA); Brigadier General (CSA)
- Units: 1st Regiment, Texas Mounted Volunteers (USA); 2nd Regiment, Texas Mounted Volunteers (USA)
- Commands: Bee's Cavalry Brigade; 1st Div, Wharton's Cavalry Corps
- Conflicts: Mexican–American War; American Civil War: Red River Campaign
- Other work: Speaker of the Texas House of Representatives, 1855–57

Hamilton Prioleau Bee (July 22, 1822 – October 3, 1897) was an American politician in early Texas; he was secretary of the Texas Senate in 1846. He served nearly 10 years as representative to the state house beginning in 1849, and for one term as Speaker of the Texas House of Representatives.

He later served as a Confederate States Army general during the American Civil War. In 1869 during the Reconstruction era, he and his family left Texas, living for several years in Saltillo, Mexico before their return to San Antonio in 1876. He lived there for most of the rest of his life.

== Early life ==
Hamilton Prioleau Bee was born into a political family in Charleston, South Carolina, on July 22, 1822. His parents were Ann Wragg (Fayssoux) and Barnard Elliott Bee, Sr. His younger brother was Barnard Elliott Bee, Jr. Bee's family moved to Texas in 1836 when Hamilton was 14. Their father Barnard Bee, Sr. was a leader in the Texas Revolution and served as Secretary of State and Secretary of War in the Republic of Texas. Bee County, Texas and the town of Beeville were named for him.

The two brothers both served as generals in the Confederate Army during the American Civil War; Barnard Jr. was killed early in the war at the Battle of First Bull Run. Hamilton followed his father into politics in the Republic of Texas and the later state, serving in elective office for more than a decade in total.

== Political career ==
At age 17, Hamilton Bee was appointed as secretary for the commission that determined the border between the United States and the Republic of Texas. Sam Houston sent Joseph C. Eldridge, Thomas S. Torrey and Bee to open negotiations with the Comanche in 1843. They achieved the Treaty of Tehuacana Creek. Bee was elected to the Texas Senate in the First Texas Legislature in 1846 and served as its secretary.

During the Mexican–American War, Bee served under Benjamin McCulloch's Company A of Col. Jack Hays's 1st Regiment of Texas Mounted Volunteers for a time. He transferred to Mirabeau B. Lamar's Texas cavalry company as a second lieutenant. Bee signed up for a second term in 1847—this time as first lieutenant—in Lamar's Company, which was by then a component of Col. Peter Hansborough Bell's regiment of Texas volunteers.

Bee moved to Laredo after the war. In 1848 he ran and won a seat in the Texas House of Representatives for the Third Texas Legislature. He was repeatedly re-elected and served from 1849 through the end of the Seventh Legislature, for a total of ten years in the House. In the Sixth Legislature, Bee was decisively elected Speaker of the House with 78 votes, to 1 vote each for N. B. Charlton and Pleasant Williams Kittrell.

== Marriage and family ==
After becoming established in the Texas legislature, at the age of 32 Bee married Mildred Tarver on May 21, 1854. After marriage, they had ten children, including sons Barnard E. Bee and Carlos Bee, born while they were living in Mexico. His grandson, Carlos Bee, was born in Berkeley, California and also became a politician. He was elected as mayor of Hayward, California and to the California State Assembly.

== Civil War ==
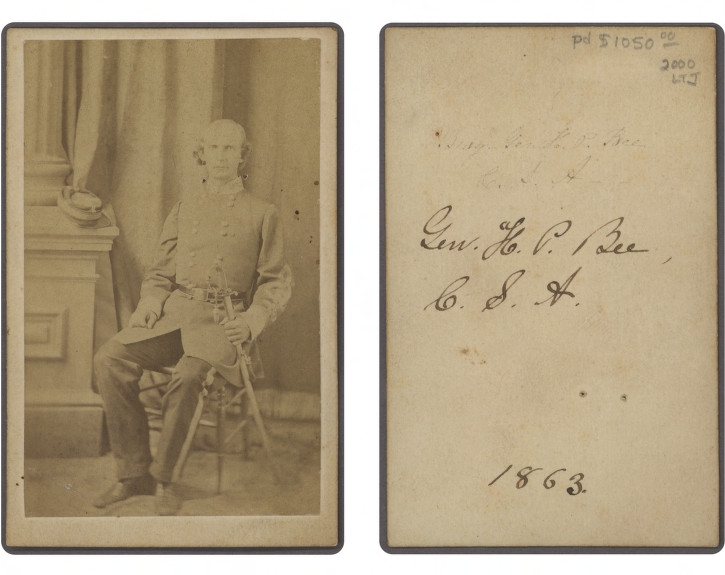
Brigadier General H P Bee, 1863.

In 1861, Bee was elected brigadier general of the Texas militia and appointed as a brigadier general in the Confederate Army on March 4, 1862. Bee commanded the brigade that consisted of Carl Buchel's 1st Texas Cavalry, Nicholas C. Gould's 23rd Texas Cavalry, Xavier Blanchard Debray's 26th Texas Cavalry, James B. Liken's 35th Texas Cavalry, Peter Cavanaugh Woods's 36th Texas Cavalry, and Alexander Watkins Terrell's Texas Cavalry Regiments.

Bee was headquartered in Brownsville, where he facilitated the trade of cotton for munitions through Mexico. On November 4, 1863, he was forced to abandon Brownsville in the face of a Union expeditionary force under Major General Nathaniel P. Banks. Bee was transferred to a field command in 1864 under Lieutenant General Richard Taylor in the Red River Campaign. In the Battle of Pleasant Hill, Bee had two different horses shot out from under him during a cavalry charge, but was only slightly wounded. One of Bee's brigade commanders at this time was Arthur P. Bagby, Jr., who later replaced him in command. Later, despite intense criticism of his handling of his troops, Bee was given command of Thomas Green's division in Major General John A. Wharton's cavalry corps in February 1865. After that time, he commanded an infantry brigade in Brigadier General Samuel B. Maxey's division.

== Postbellum ==
After the war in 1869 during the Reconstruction era, Bee moved his family to Saltillo, Mexico. They lived in a self-imposed exile in Mexico until 1876. By then Democrats were regaining control of the Texas state legislature. He became a steward and superintendent of the farm at the Agricultural and Mechanical College of Texas, now known as Texas A&M University. They returned to live in San Antonio, where Bee practiced law. He was appointed the Texas Commissioner of the Office of Insurance, Statistics, and History (now the Texas Department of Insurance) for the 1885-1886 legislative term.

After Bee died on October 3, 1897, he was buried in the Confederate Cemetery in San Antonio.

== See also ==
- List of American Civil War generals (Confederate)

== Notes ==
Preceded by Unknown	Member of the Texas House of Representatives; 1849–1859	Succeeded by Unknown
Preceded by Hardin Richard Runnels	Speaker of the Texas House of Representatives; 1855–1857	Succeeded by William S. Taylor
