= Solomon's Lodge, Charleston =

Solomon's Lodge No. 1 A.F.M. (Ancient Free Masons) in Charleston is the oldest Masonic Lodge in South Carolina. It was established and organized in 1734, received a Warrant of Constitution from the Moderns' Grand Lodge at London in 1735 and held its first meeting under this warrant on October 28, 1736.

It has often been confused with Solomon's Lodge in Savannah, Georgia, also a founding lodge for that state, and founded in the same year. The Charter that was issued to Solomon's Lodge No.1 in Charleston was signed prior to Solomon's Lodge Number 1 in Savannah, however, the ship carrying both charters broke down and was towed into port in Savannah, Georgia. Once in Savannah, the Charter for Solomon's Lodge in Savannah was delivered first, allowing them to meet 9 months prior to Solomon's Lodge at Charleston.

Solomon's Lodge No.1 in Charleston has had several brothers of distinction to include John Hammerton, the first Grand Master of the Provincial Grand Lodge of South Carolina. The first American ambassador to Mexico, Joel Roberts Poinsett was a Past Master of the lodge. Other prominent members include Rev. Robert Smith, founder of the College of Charleston, and Isaac Auld, one of the "Eleven Gentlemen of Charleston" who were the first members of the Supreme Council of the Scottish Rite, founded at Charleston on May 31, 1801. Perhaps its most notable member was Albert G. Mackey, who was Master of Solomon's Lodge No.1 in 1843.
