= John Mathews (lawyer) =

American Founding Father and politician

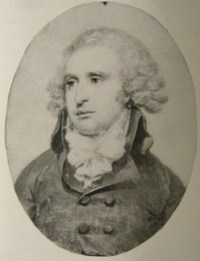
- Reproduction of watercolor on ivory miniature attributed to Richard Cosway.

33rd Governor of South Carolina
- In office January 31, 1782 – February 4, 1783
- Lieutenant: Richard Hutson
- Preceded by: John Rutledge
- Succeeded by: Benjamin Guerard

2nd and 4th Speaker of the South Carolina House of Representatives
- In office January 1779 – December 1779
- Preceded by: Thomas Bee
- Succeeded by: Thomas Farr
- In office December 1776 – Spring 1777
- Preceded by: James Parsons
- Succeeded by: Thomas Bee

Delegate to the Continental Congress from South Carolina
- In office 1778–1781

Personal details
- Born: 1744 Charleston, Province of South Carolina, British America
- Died: November 17, 1802 (aged 57–58) Charleston, South Carolina, U.S.
- Education: Middle Temple, London, England

John Mathews (1744 – November 17, 1802) was a Founding Father of the United States and lawyer from Charleston, South Carolina. He was a delegate to the Continental Congress from 1778 to 1781 where he endorsed the Articles of Confederation on behalf of South Carolina. On his return, he was elected the 33rd governor of South Carolina, serving a single term in 1782 and 1783.

== Biography ==
Mathews was born in Charleston in the Province of South Carolina in 1744. He was the son of John Mathews and Sarah Gibbes; the exact date of his birth is not known. He was commissioned an ensign and in the South Carolina Provincial Regiment which took part in an expedition against the Cherokee in the early 1760s and was promoted to lieutenant.

He studied law at Middle Temple in London. He was a law clerk for Colonel Charles Pinckney after returning to South Carolina, was admitted to the bar, and practiced in Charleston. In 1772, he was elected to the colonial Assembly. In 1775 and 1776, he was a member of the First and Second South Carolina Provincial Congresses. In 1776, he was appointed an associate judge of the state circuit court. From 1776 to 1780, he served in the South Carolina House of Representatives, and he was speaker in 1777 and 1778. During the American Revolutionary War, he served as a captain in the Colleton County regiment. He was a founding trustee of the College of Charleston.

Mathews was a member of the Continental Congress from 1778 to 1781. In the summer of 1780, a low point for Americans during the Revolution, he moved in Congress that Commander in Chief George Washington be given absolute power to raise and equip an army and to draw on the treasury for the money that he needed. Congress was to accept whatever he did. Congress refused to submit the motion to committee and a number of delegates severely censured Mathews.

Mathews was a supporter of the Articles of Confederation. He was then elected governor by the state legislature and served from 1782 to 1783. After leaving the governorship, Mathews won election as a judge of the state Court of Chancery in 1784. He was again elected to the South Carolina House in 1784. He was a judge of the state Court of Equity in 1791.

Mathews died in Charleston on November 17, 1802. He was buried at Circular Congregational Church Burying Ground in Charleston.

== Family ==
In 1766 he married Mary Wragg. After her death, in 1799 he married Sarah Rutledge, the sister of Founding Fathers John Rutledge and Edward Rutledge.

His sister Elizabeth Mathews was the wife of Founding Father Thomas Heyward Jr.

Political offices
Preceded by John Rutledge	Governor of South Carolina; 1782–1783	Succeeded by Benjamin Guerard
