= Drayton Island =

Island in Putnam County, Florida, United States

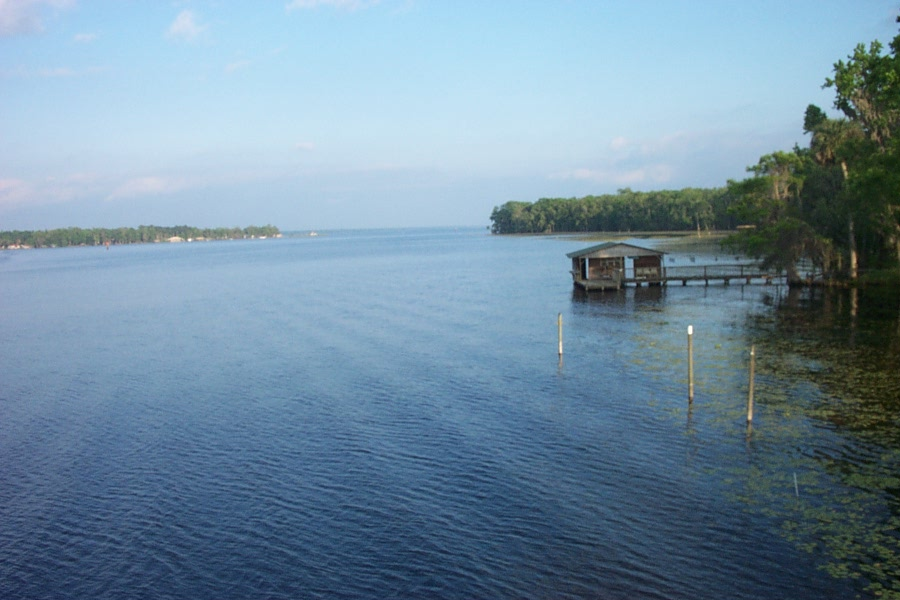
- Saint Johns River with Drayton Island on right.

- Drayton Island

Geography
- Coordinates: 29.36121°N 81.63888°W
- Adjacent to: Lake George

Administration
- United States
- State: Florida
- County: Putnam

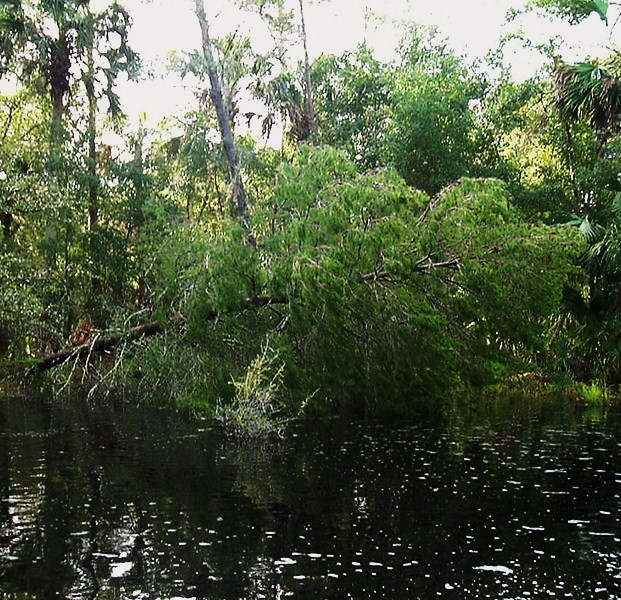
Drayton Island

Drayton Island is a privately owned heavily wooded island at the northern end of Lake George on the west side of the Saint Johns River's main channel in Putnam County, Florida, United States.

Drayton Island, during the steamboat period on the St. Johns River, was a scheduled stop for tourists and boasted a hotel built in 1875 that burned in 1878. A small subdivision was established and several homes that still exist were built. During the plantation slavery period, prior to 1865, cotton and other export crops were grown on the island. Between freezes, orange groves produced prize fruit that brought a premium price in northern markets. The Archaic Indian Mounds, on the north end of the island, are owned by The Archaeology Conservancy, Albuquerque, NM.

The St. Johns River is navigable from Sanford, Florida, to Jacksonville, Florida. Lake George is about 85 miles (137 km) south of Jacksonville. The lake is 11 miles (18 km) long and about 7 miles (11 km) wide. Drayton Island is 1,700 acres (690 hectares) situated in the north end of the lake. Hog Island, a smaller island, is west of Drayton Island.

The island is located across the river from a marina in Georgetown. A small public ferry, one of three left on the river, holds two cars at a time and serves the small island's population.

== History ==
The island was developed as a plantation when William Drayton Sr, a migrant from South Carolina, bought it along with other properties in Florida. It was named after him. He served as chief justice of the province of East Florida during colonial years and the American Revolution (1765–1780).

In the early nineteenth century the plantation was operated by Zephaniah Kingsley.

A ferry connects the island to the mainland. In 2001 it was run by Edward Babbitt, who had operated the ferry for over 40 years.

== See also ==
- St. Johns River
- Lake George
- William Drayton Sr.
