= Benjamin Guerard =

American politician

34th Governor of South Carolina
- In office February 4, 1783 – February 11, 1785
- Lieutenant: Richard Beresford; William Moultrie
- Preceded by: John Mathews
- Succeeded by: William Moultrie

Member of the South Carolina House of Representatives from St. Helena Parish
- In office February 11, 1785 – March 22, 1786
- In office January 6, 1783 – February 4, 1783
- In office August 1, 1779 – January 1, 1781

Member of the South Carolina Senate from St. Helena Parish
- In office January 8, 1782 – January 6, 1783
- Preceded by: John Barnwell
- Succeeded by: John Barnwell

Member of the General Assembly of the Province of South Carolina
- In office 1765–1768

Personal details
- Born: baptized May 23, 1740 Charlestown, Province of South Carolina, British America
- Died: December 21, 1788 (aged 48) Charleston, South Carolina, U.S.

Military service
- Allegiance: United States
- Battles/wars: American Revolutionary War; *Siege of Charleston

Benjamin Guerard (1740 – December 21, 1788) was a lawyer, patriot of the Revolutionary War and the 34th governor of South Carolina from 1783 to 1785.

== Early life and career ==
Guerard was born in Charlestown to John Guerard and Elizabeth Hill. He was baptized on May 23, 1740; his exact date of birth is unknown. He studied law in England and was admitted to the South Carolina bar in 1761. Afterwards he practiced law in Charleston and was a member of the South Carolina Provincial Assembly from 1765 to 1768. In 1778, Guerard was elected to the South Carolina House of Representatives and served for one term.

Guerard was married on November 29, 1766 to Sarah Middleton, who died with their son on a sea voyage to New York City in 1775. He married a second time to Marianne Kennan on April 7, 1786 and the two did not have any children.

== Revolutionary War ==
With the opening of the Southern theater in the American Revolutionary War, Guerard enlisted in the militia and participated in the siege of Charleston by the British in 1780. The colonists surrendered Charlestown on May 12, 1780 and Guerard became a prisoner, although he was paroled. A year later, Guerard was found in violation of his parole and jailed on the schooner Pack Horse. He offered his estate to provide for the maintenance of the American prisoners, but the British refused this proposal because his land was in the territory controlled by the Americans. The British exiled him in 1781 to Philadelphia and Guerard subsequently made his way back to South Carolina.

== Political career ==
Guerard was elected later in 1781 to the South Carolina Senate from St. Helena's Parish and was appointed a commissioner for the state to negotiate an agreement between the British and American forces to prevent plunder and maintain order from the evacuation of British troops from the state. He returned as a member to the House of Representatives in 1783 for a brief period until his election by the General Assembly as Governor of South Carolina for a two-year term. While governor, he came into dispute with General Nathanael Greene regarding the reception of the British Governor of East Florida, Patrick Tonyn.

== Later life ==
After leaving the governorship in 1785, Guerard remained in Charleston where he died on December 21, 1788.

Political offices
Preceded by John Mathews	Governor of South Carolina; 1783–1785	Succeeded by William Moultrie
