= William Drayton =

American politician (1776–1846)

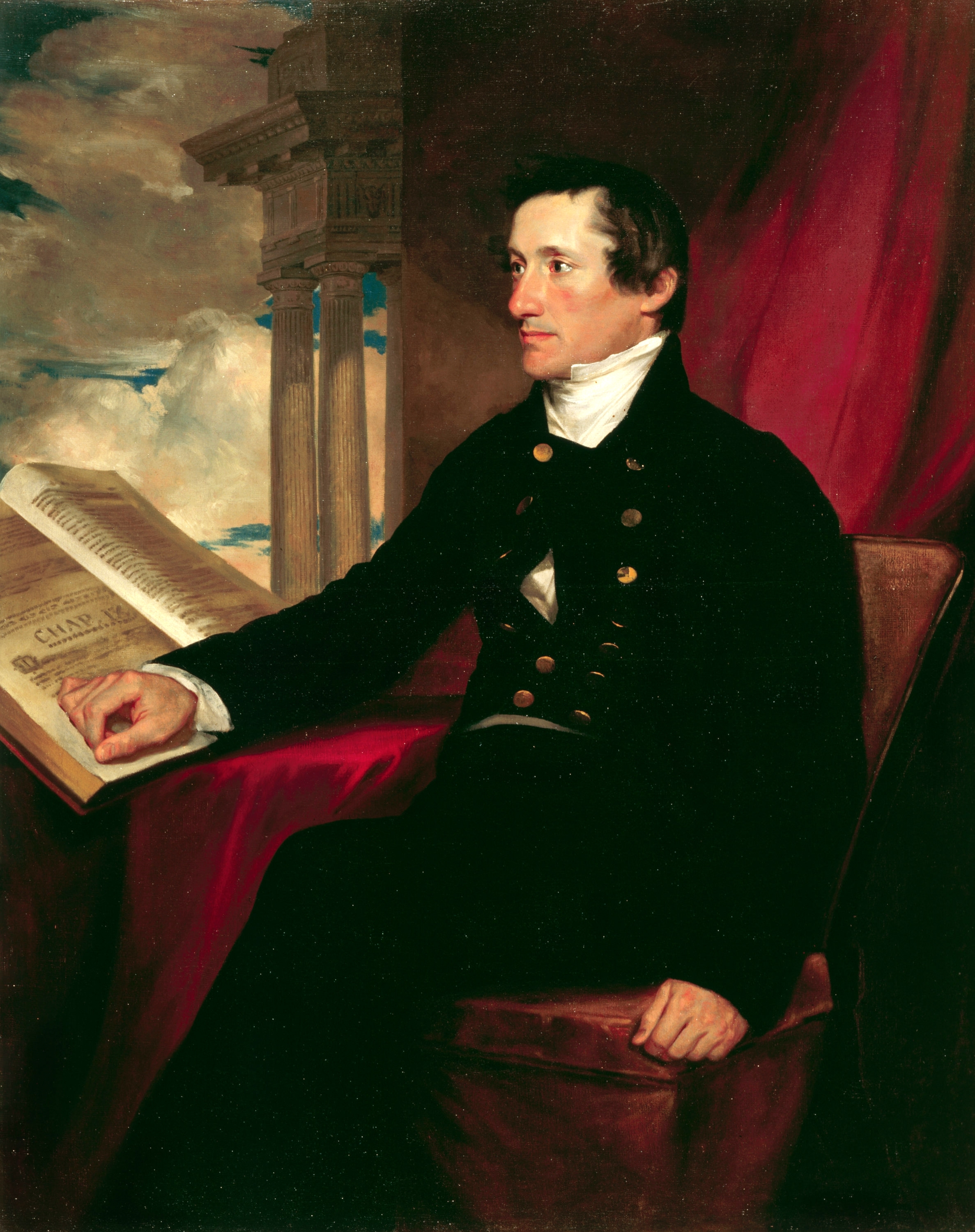
- Portrait by Samuel Morse, 1818

Member of the U.S. House of Representatives from South Carolina's 1st district
- In office May 17, 1825 – March 3, 1833
- Preceded by: Joel R. Poinsett
- Succeeded by: Henry L. Pinckney

Member of the South Carolina House of Representatives from St. Philip's and St. Michael's Parish
- In office November 24, 1806 – June 29, 1808

Personal details
- Born: December 30, 1776 St. Augustine, East Florida
- Died: May 24, 1846 (aged 69) Philadelphia, Pennsylvania
- Party: Jacksonian
- Profession: banker, planter, politician

Military service
- Allegiance: United States
- Branch/service: United States Army
- Years of service: 1812–1815
- Rank: Colonel
- Battles/wars: War of 1812

William Drayton (December 30, 1776 – May 24, 1846) was an American politician, banker, and writer who grew up in Charleston, South Carolina. He was the son of William Drayton Sr., who served as justice of the Province of East Florida (1765–1780).

Drayton served as a United States representative to Congress (1825–1833). Following the Nullification Crisis, as a unionist Drayton decided to move his family to Philadelphia, Pennsylvania, in 1833 and lived there the rest of his life.

== Early life and education ==
The son of William Drayton Sr. and his wife, William was born in St. Augustine in East Florida (then a colony of the Kingdom of Great Britain), where his father served from 1765 to 1780 as the chief justice for the Province of East Florida. In 1780 the judge lost his position due to accusations of sympathy with rebels in the American Revolutionary War; he returned with his family to Charleston. He had bought property and plantations in Florida, including what became known as Drayton Island.

The Drayton sons were sent to England to complete their educations. Afterward, with his older brother Jacob, William studied law in Charleston. Both became lawyers.

== Marriage and family ==
About 1804 William Drayton married Anna Gadsden (d. 1814), a cousin once removed. They had four children:

- Emma Gadsden (c. 1804 – 1840)
- Thomas Fenwick (1809–1891), became a Confederate Army general
- Percival (1812–1865), became a career US Naval officer
- William Sidney (b. c. 1814 – 1860), became a US Naval officer and shipping businessman

After Anna's death, in 1817 Drayton married Maria Heyward. Two of their five children survived to adulthood. Maria Heyward Drayton was also close to her young stepchildren.:

- William Heyward, became a lawyer in Philadelphia.
- Henry Edward, became a doctor in Philadelphia. The two younger Drayton brothers married the sisters Harriet and Sarah Coleman, respectively.

Thomas Drayton, a West Point graduate, stayed in South Carolina when the family moved north and bought a plantation at Hilton Head. He resigned from the US Army to join Confederate forces after secession. He and his brother Percival "commanded opposing forces" in the battle of Port Royal, South Carolina, when Union forces captured the forts.

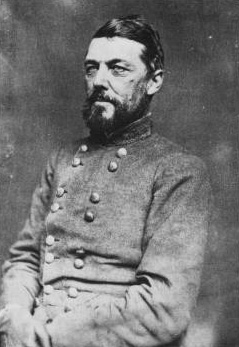
Thomas Fenwick Drayton, General CSA

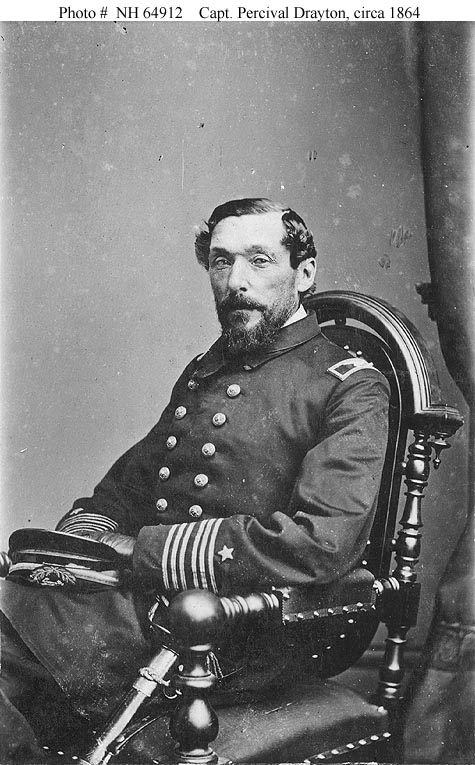
Percival Drayton, Captain USN

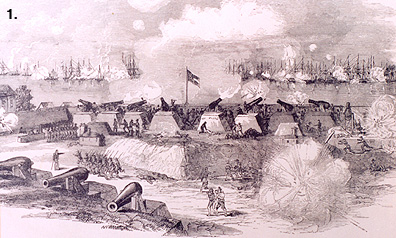
Battle of Port Royal November 7, 1861

== Career ==
Coat of Arms of William Drayton, Jr.

William Drayton served in the War of 1812, where he was commissioned as a colonel (a rank he used all his life). In a November 12, 1816, letter to president-elect James Monroe, Andrew Jackson recommended, unsuccessfully, that Drayton, a Federalist who had shown loyalty to the Madison administration and the union through his military service, be appointed Secretary of War to heal the breach between the Federalist Party, now largely moribund on the national level, and the Republicans. Colonel Drayton was elected in 1824 to represent South Carolina's first district in the U.S. Congress, and served from 1825 to 1833 with repeated re-election.

A unionist during the nullification controversy, in 1833 he moved his family to Philadelphia. Two years later in 1835, he was elected a member of the American Philosophical Society. While a unionist, Drayton continued to support slavery. In Philadelphia he wrote and published The South Vindicated from the Treason and Fanaticism of the Abolitionists (1836), a pro-slavery tract. He briefly became the president of the defunct Second Bank of the United States in 1841.

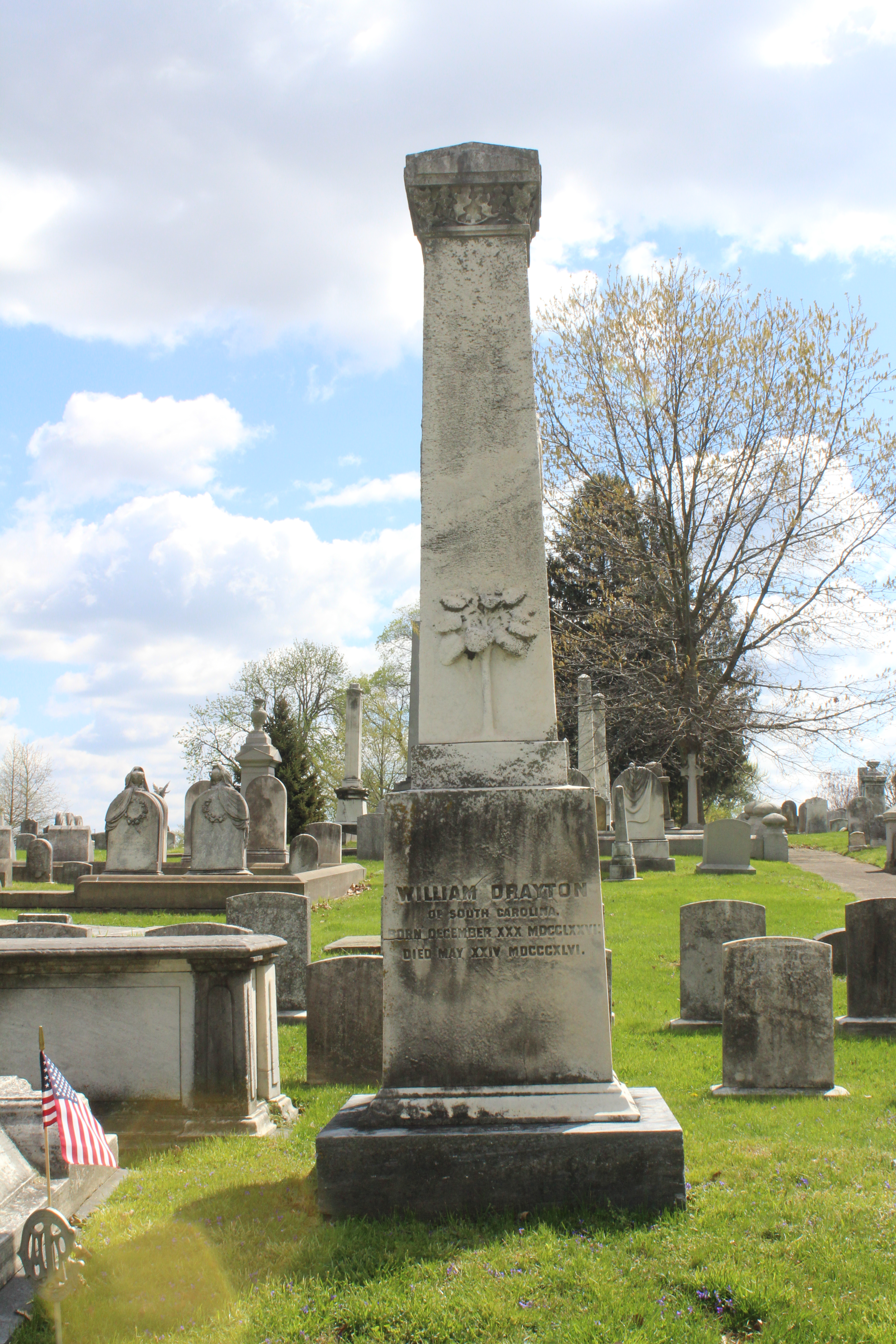
William Drayton gravestone in Laurel Hill Cemetery

Drayton died on May 24, 1846, in Philadelphia and was interred at Laurel Hill Cemetery.

== Legacy and honors ==
- His papers are held by the Historical Society of Pennsylvania in Philadelphia.
- The author Edgar Allan Poe dedicated his collection Tales of the Grotesque and Arabesque (1840) to him.

== Bibliography ==
- The South Vindicated from the Treason and Fanatacism of the Northern Abolitionists, H. Manly (Philadelphia), 1836

== Notes ==
U.S. House of Representatives
Preceded by Joel Roberts Poinsett	Member of the U.S. House of Representatives from South Carolina's 1st congressional district 1825–1833	Succeeded by Henry L. Pinckney
