= Barnard E. Bee =

Confederate States Army general

Barnard Elliott Bee Jr.
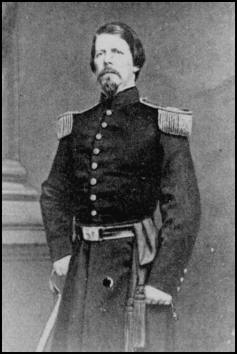
- Born: February 8, 1824; Charleston, South Carolina, U.S.
- Died: July 22, 1861 (aged 37); Manassas, Virginia, C.S.
- Burial place: Saint Paul's Episcopal Church Cemetery, Pendleton, South Carolina
- Military career
- Allegiance: United States of America; Confederate States of America
- Branch: United States Army; Confederate States Army
- Service years: 1845–1861 (USA); 1861 (CSA)
- Rank: Bvt. Lieutenant Colonel (USA); Brigadier General (CSA)
- Units: 3rd U.S. Infantry; 10th U.S. Infantry; 1st S.C. Regulars
- Commands: Utah Volunteer Battalion (USA); 3rd Brigade, Army of the Shenandoah (CSA)
- Conflicts: Mexican–American War: Battle of Cerro Gordo; Battle of Chapultepec; Utah War; American Civil War: First Battle of Bull Run †

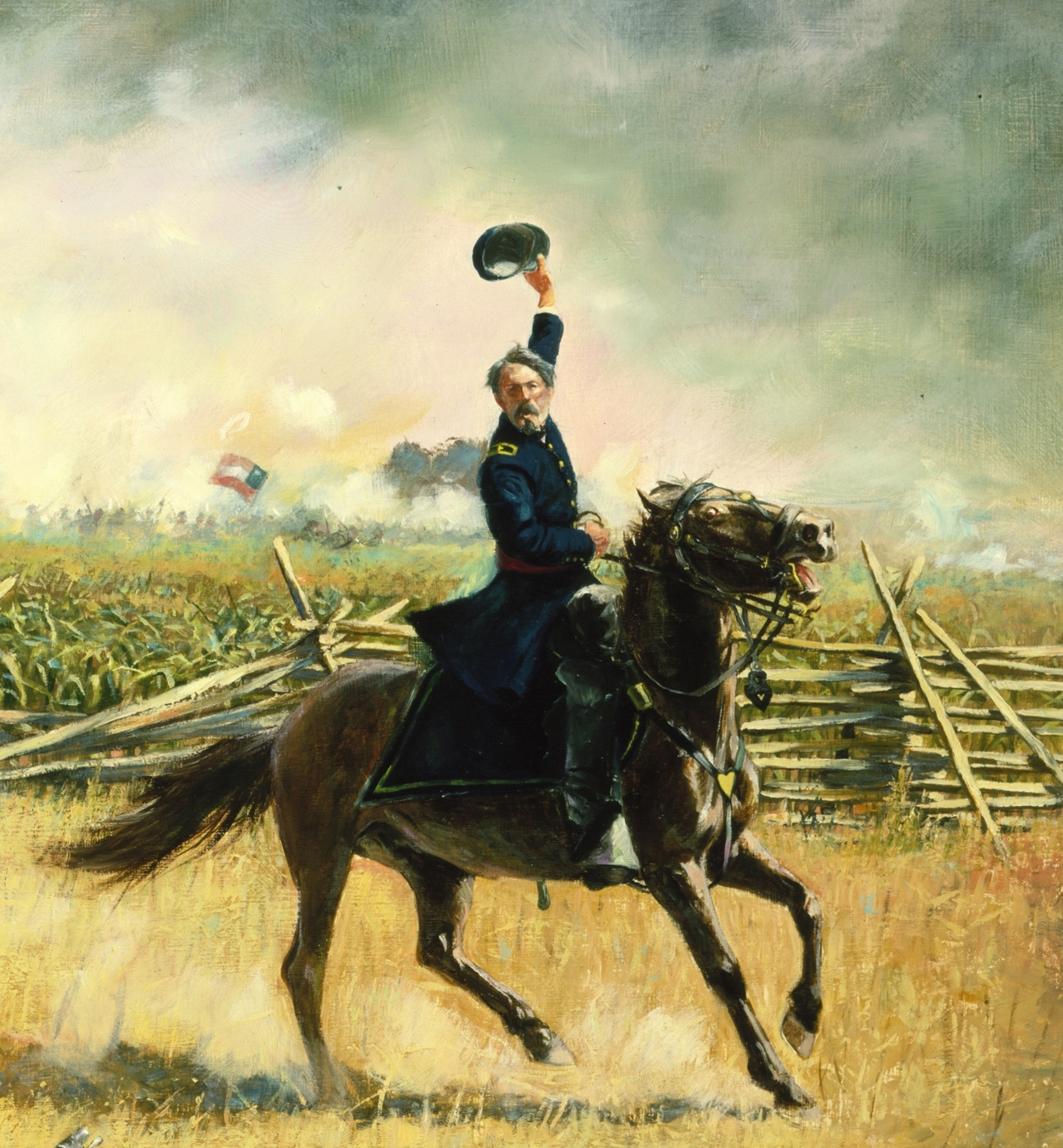
Brig. Gen. Barnard Bee leads the 4th Alabama against Matthew's Hill

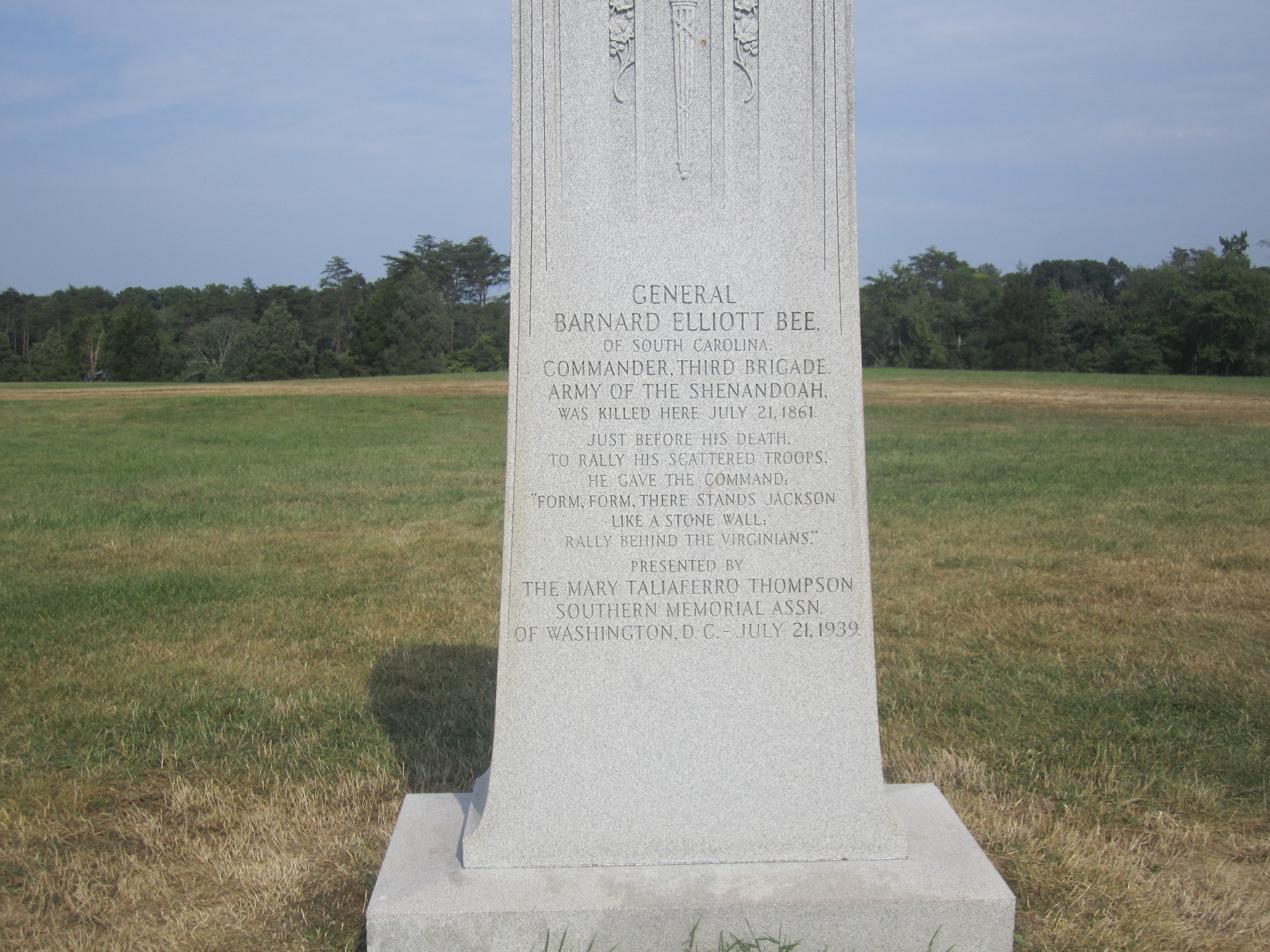
Barnard Bee Jr. monument at Manassas National Battlefield Park

Barnard Elliott Bee Jr. (February 8, 1824 – July 22, 1861) was a United States Army officer and a Confederate States Army general during the American Civil War. He was mortally wounded at the First Battle of Bull Run, one of the first general officers to be killed in the war. During that battle, he was responsible for inspiring the famous nickname for Brig. Gen. Thomas J. "Stonewall" Jackson.

== Early life ==
Bee was born in Charleston, South Carolina on February 8, 1824. He was the son of Barnard E. Bee Sr., and Ann Wragg Fayssoux, both of whom came from prominent Charleston families of English descent. His mother's paternal line also included French Huguenots. In 1833, the Bee family moved to Pendleton, South Carolina, where the junior Bee attended the Pendleton Academy.

In 1836, Bee's parents moved to Texas, which had achieved independence as the Republic of Texas. Bee remained in Pendleton living with his mother's three sisters to pursue his education. Bee graduated from the United States Military Academy on July 1, 1845, thirty-third in his class of forty-one and assigned as a brevet second lieutenant to the 3rd U.S. Infantry Regiment. He accumulated many demerits while at West Point, including several for chewing tobacco while on duty. Bee's first posting was to serve in the United States military occupation of Texas during the Mexican–American War. He was twice brevetted for gallantry in the War, first at Cerro Gordo to first lieutenant, where he was wounded, and then to captain at Chapultepec.

Bee was posted after the war to garrison duty at Pascagoula, Mississippi, where he served as adjutant. From 1849 to 1855, he was on frontier duty in New Mexico. He was stationed primarily at Fort Fillmore near Las Cruces, New Mexico. In 1855, Bee was promoted to captain of Company D of the Tenth Infantry and posted to Fort Snelling, Minnesota. While at Fort Snelling, he met and married Sophia Elizabeth Hill, the sister of a fellow officer. In 1857, Bee's company took part in the Utah War, which involved confrontation with members of the Church of Jesus Christ of Latter-day Saints, also known as Mormons. He was placed in command of the Utah Volunteer Battalion and brevetted to the rank of lieutenant colonel. In 1860, Bee was posted to Fort Laramie, Wyoming, where he briefly served as the fort's commanding officer.

Bee served as best man at the wedding of his West Point classmate Nathan G. Evans.

== Civil War ==
Upon the start of the Civil War, Bee, like many Army officers from the South, was torn between loyalty to his home state or to the United States. He struggled with the decision but opted to stay with the South. On March 3, 1861, Bee resigned from the United States Army and returned to Charleston where he was elected lieutenant colonel of the 1st South Carolina Regulars.

On June 17, 1861, Bee was appointed brigadier general of a brigade mobilized at Manassas Junction, although he was confirmed by the Confederate Senate posthumously. He was given command of the third brigade of the Army of the Shenandoah, under Brigadier General Joseph E. Johnston. During the subsequent battle, later known as the First Battle of Bull Run, on July 21, 1861, Bee said, "There is Jackson standing like a stone wall. Let us determine to die here, and we will conquer. Rally behind the Virginians!" in reference to Brigadier General Thomas J. Jackson and his men, giving rise to the name "Stonewall Jackson" and his Stonewall Brigade. It is unclear if this was meant to be complimentary or an insult regarding Jackson’s men not advancing. Bee was wounded in the stomach by a Union artillery shell and after considerable suffering, died the next day. As a result, it could not be determined whether his naming of Stonewall Jackson was intended as praise, a condemnation, or whether it was simply a misattributed quote. Bee is buried at St. Paul's Episcopal Church Cemetery in Pendleton, South Carolina.

Bee was the younger brother of Hamilton P. Bee, who was also a Confederate Army brigadier general, and the brother-in-law of Confederate brigadier general Clement H. Stevens.

== See also ==
- List of American Civil War generals (Confederate)
