= William Drayton Sr. =

American judge

Judge of the United States District Court for the District of South Carolina
- In office November 18, 1789 – May 18, 1790
- Appointed by: George Washington
- Preceded by: Seat established by 1 Stat. 73
- Succeeded by: Thomas Bee

Chief Justice for the Province of East Florida
- In office 1765–1778
- Appointed by: James Grant
- Preceded by: James Moultrie
- Succeeded by: James Hume

Personal details
- Born: William Drayton; March 21, 1732 Ashley River, Province of South Carolina, British America
- Died: May 18, 1790 (aged 58) South Carolina
- Children: William Drayton
- Education: Middle Temple read law

Coat of Arms of William Drayton, Sr.

William Drayton Sr. (March 21, 1732 – May 18, 1790) was chief justice of the British American Province of East Florida and a United States district judge of the United States District Court for the District of South Carolina.

== Education and career ==
Born March 21, 1732, near the Ashley River in the Province of South Carolina, British America, Drayton graduated from the Middle Temple in London, England in 1754 and read law in 1756. He was a Justice of the Peace in Berkeley County, Province of South Carolina from 1756 to 1763. He was chief justice of the British American Province of East Florida from 1765 to 1778. He resigned that post due to conflicts with Governor Patrick Tonyn of the Province of East Florida. He was a Judge of the South Carolina Admiralty Court in 1789. He was an associate justice of the Supreme Court of South Carolina in 1789.

== Landholdings in Florida ==
Drayton bought properties in Florida, including what is called Drayton Island, but was an indifferent planter.

== Federal judicial service ==
Drayton received a recess appointment from President George Washington on November 18, 1789, to the United States District Court for the District of South Carolina, to a new seat authorized by 1 Stat. 73. He was nominated to the same position by President Washington on February 8, 1790. He was confirmed by the United States Senate on February 10, 1790, and received his commission the same day. His service terminated on May 18, 1790, due to his death in South Carolina. Drayton was the first United States federal judge to die in office.

== Family ==
Drayton was the father of William Drayton, a United States representative from South Carolina.

Legal offices
Preceded by Seat established by 1 Stat. 73	Judge of the United States District Court for the District of South Carolina; 1789–1790	Succeeded by Thomas Bee
