= Battle of Sullivan's Island =

1776 battle of the American Revolutionary War

- Part of the Southern theater of the American Revolutionary War
- c. 1782–1791 painting of the battle
Date	June 28, 1776
Location	Sullivan's Island, South Carolina 32.7590°N 79.8579°W
Result	American victory

Belligerents
United Colonies	Great Britain

Commanders and leaders
Charles Lee; William Moultrie; Francis Marion	Henry Clinton; Sir Peter Parker (WIA)

Strength
Fort Sullivan: 435 militia; Other defences: 6,000+ regulars and militia; 3 shore batteries	2,200 regulars; 2 ships of the line; 6 frigates; 1 bomb vessel

Casualties and losses
12 killed; 25 wounded	91 killed; 170 wounded; 1 frigate scuttled
- Location within South Carolina

The Battle of Sullivan's Island (also known as the Battle of Fort Sullivan) was fought on June 28, 1776, at Sullivan's Island, South Carolina during the Southern theater of the American Revolutionary War. Taking place near Charles Town, it was fought as part of the first British attempt to capture the city from American forces during the war. The battle is also sometimes referred to as the first siege of Charleston due to a more successful second British siege of the city in 1780.

Britain organized an expeditionary force in early 1776 for operations in the Southern Colonies. Delayed by logistical concerns and bad weather, the expeditionary force reached the coast of North Carolina in May 1776. Finding conditions unsuitable for their operations, Major-general Henry Clinton and Commodore Sir Peter Parker decided instead to act against Charlestown. Arriving there in early June, Clinton's troops were landed on Long Island near Sullivan's Island, where Colonel William Moultrie commanded the partially constructed Fort Sullivan in preparation for a naval bombardment and land assault. Major General Charles Lee, the commander of American forces in the South, provided overall supervision.

The British land assault was frustrated when the channel between the two islands was found to be too deep to wade, and the American defenses prevented an amphibious landing. Parker's squadron carried out a naval bombardment, which had little effect due to the sandy soil and the spongy nature of the fort's palmetto log construction. Careful fire by the defenders wrought extensive damage on the British squadron, which withdrew after an entire day's bombardment; the British withdrew their expeditionary force to New York and would not return to South Carolina until 1780. The battle's legacy included being commemorated by the official state flag of South Carolina.

== Background ==
When the American Revolutionary War broke out on April 19, 1775, the city of Charles Town, in the Province of South Carolina, was a center of commerce in the Southern Colonies of British America. The city's citizens had joined other colonists in opposing unpopular British policies, and militia recruitment increased when word arrived of the Battles of Lexington and Concord. Throughout 1775 and into 1776, militia recruits arrived in the city from the colony's backcountry, the city's manufacturers and tradesmen began producing war material, and defensive fortifications began to take shape around the city.

=== British operations ===
British forces in North America were primarily tied up with the siege of Boston in 1775. Seeking bases of operations where they had more control, the British planned an expedition to the southern colonies. Major-general Henry Clinton, then in Boston, was to travel to Cape Fear in North Carolina, where he would join forces with Loyalists raised in the North Carolina backcountry along with 2,500 British Army troops from Ireland under Major-general Lord Cornwallis.

The plan was beset by difficulties from the start. Cornwallis' troops, originally supposed to depart at the beginning of December 1775, were delayed by logistical difficulties, and Cornwallis and his soldiers did not depart until February 13, 1776, escorted by a Royal Navy squadron of 11 warships under Commodore Sir Peter Parker. Clinton left Boston on January 20 with two companies of light infantry, and first stopped at New York City to confer with Governor William Tryon. Major General Charles Lee, sent by General George Washington to see to the defense of New York, coincidentally arrived there the same day as Clinton. New York was at that time extremely tense; Patriot forces were beginning to disarm and evict Loyalists, and the British squadorn anchored there was having difficulty acquiring provisions. Despite this, Clinton made no secret that his final target was in the south. Lee observed that this was "certainly a droll way of proceeding; to communicate his full plan to the enemy is too novel to be credited." This was not even the first notice of the expedition to the colonists; a letter intercepted in December had already provided intelligence that the British were planning to go to the South.

Clinton arrived at Cape Fear on March 12, expecting to find the European convoy already there. He met with the royal governors of North and South Carolina, Josiah Martin and William Campbell, and learned that the recruited Scottish Loyalists had been defeated at Moore's Creek Bridge two weeks earlier. Clinton also received pleas for assistance from the Royal Governor of Georgia, James Wright, who had been arrested, and then escaped to a navy ship.

Parker's squadron had an extremely difficult crossing. Battered by storms and high seas, the first ships of the squadron did not arrive at Cape Fear until April 18, and Cornwallis did not arrive until May 3. After several weeks there, in which the British troops raided Patriot properties, Clinton, Cornwallis and Parker concluded that Cape Fear was not a suitable base for further operations. Parker had sent out some ships on scouting expeditions up and down the coast, and reports on the partially finished condition of the Charles on defenses were sufficiently promising that the decision was made to go there.

=== American defenses ===
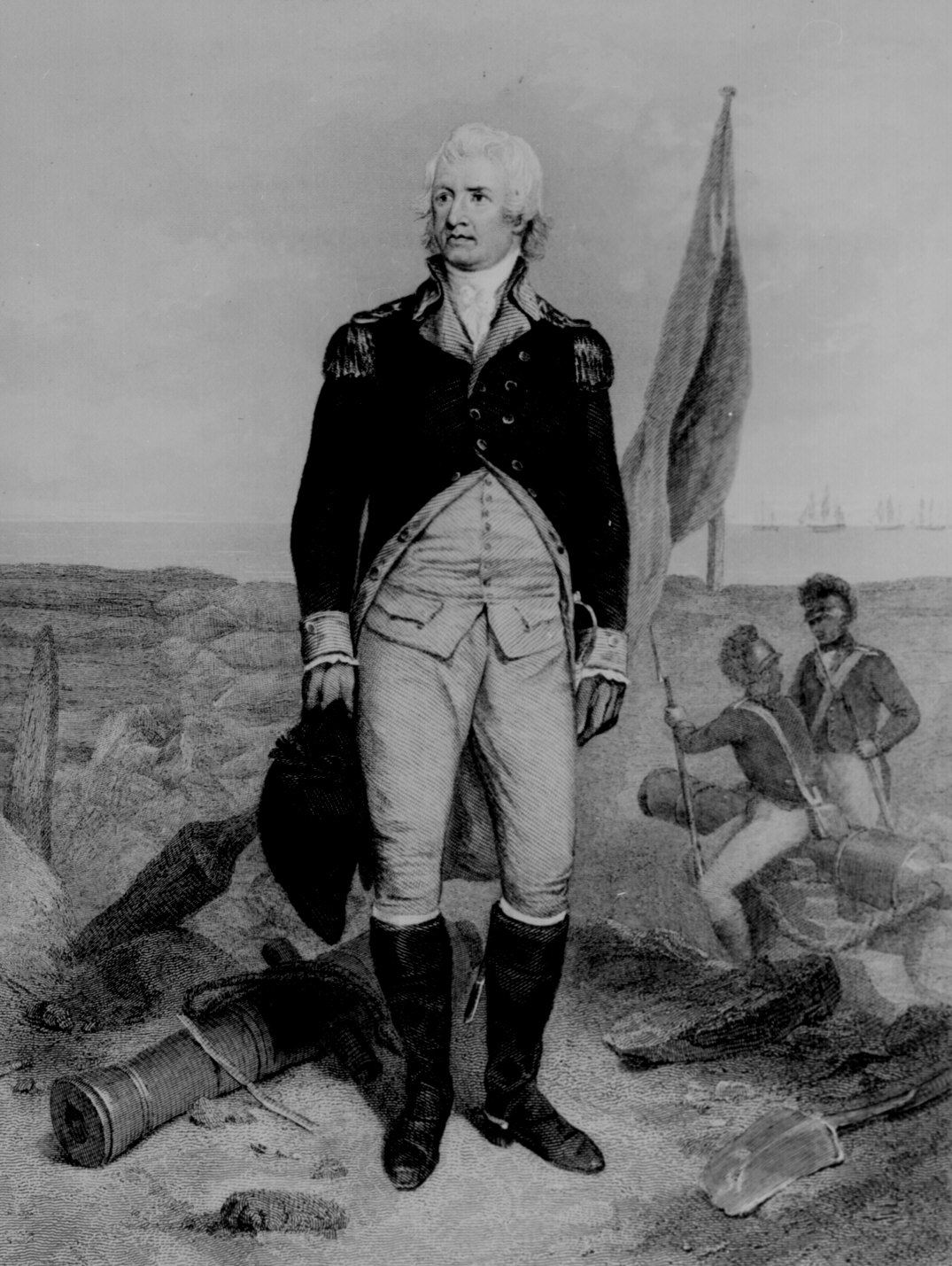
William Moultrie, who defended Sullivan's Island during the battle

John Rutledge, who had recently been elected president of the South Carolina General Assembly (which formed the backbone of the state's revolutionary government), organized a defense force under Colonel William Moultrie, a 46-year old former militiaman and veteran of the Indian Wars. These forces comprised three infantry regiments, two rifle regiments, and a small artillery regiment; they were augmented by three independent artillery companies, and the total force numbered about 2,000. These forces were further augmented by the arrival of Continental regiments from North Carolina and Virginia (1,900 troops), as well as militia numbering 2,700 from Charles Town and the surrounding backcountry.

Moultrie saw Sullivan's Island, a sandy spit of land at the entrance to Charles Town Harbor extending north about 4 miles (6.4 km) long and a few hundred yards wide, as a place well suited to build a fort that could protect the entrance from intruding enemy warships. A large vessel sailing into the city's first had to cross Charles Town Bar, a series of submerged shoals lying about 8 miles (13 km) southeast of the city, and then pass by the southern end of Sullivan's Island as it entered the channel to the inner harbor. Later it would also have to pass the northern end of James Island, where Fort Johnson commanded the southeastern approach to the city. Moultrie and his 2nd South Carolina Regiment arrived on Sullivan's Island in March 1776, and began construction of a fortress built out of palmetto logs to defend the island and the channel into Charles Town Harbor. The construction moved slowly; Captain Peter Horry of the Patriot naval detachment described the site as "an immense pen 500 feet long, and 16 feet wide, filled with sand to stop the shot". The gun platforms were made of planks two inches thick and fastened with wooden spikes.

Congress had appointed General Lee to command the Continental Army troops in the southern colonies, and his movements by land shadowed those of Clinton's squadron as it sailed south. Lee wrote from Wilmington on June 1 that the squadron had sailed, but that he did not know whether it was sailing for Virginia or South Carolina. He headed for Charles Town, saying "[I] confess I know not whether I shall go to or from the enemy." He arrived in Charles Town shortly after the squadron anchored outside the harbor, and took command of the city's defenses. He immediately ran into a problem: the South Carolina troops (militia or the colonial regiments) were not on the Continental line, and thus not formally under his authority. Some South Carolina troops resisted his instructions, and Rutledge had to intervene by proclaiming Lee in command of all South Carolina forces.

Square-shaped Fort Sullivan consisted only of the completed seaward wall, with walls made from palmetto logs 20 feet (6.1 m) high and 16 feet (4.9 m) wide. The walls were filled with sand, and rose 10 feet (3.0 m) above the wooden platforms on which the artillery were mounted. A hastily erected palisade of thick planks helped guard the powder magazine and unfinished northern walls. An assortment of 31 cannon, ranging from 9- and 12-pounders to a few British 18-pounders and French 26-pounders, dotted the front and rear walls. General Lee, when he had seen its unfinished state, had recommended abandoning the fort, calling it a "slaughter pen". President Rutledge refused, and specifically ordered Moultrie to "obey [Lee] in everything, except in leaving Fort Sullivan". Moultrie's delaying tactics so angered Lee that he decided on June 27 that he would replace Moultrie; the battle began the next day before he could do so. Lee did make plans for an orderly retreat to Haddrell's Point.

=== British arrival ===
The British squadron weighed anchor at Cape Fear on May 31, and arrived outside Charles Town Harbor the next day. Moultrie noticed a British scout boat apparently looking for possible landing points on nearby Long Island, just a few hundred yards from Sullivan's Island; troops were consequently sent to occupy the northern end of Sullivan's. By June 8, most of the British squadron had crossed the bar and anchored in Five Fathom Hole, an anchorage between the bar and the harbor entrance. With the fort on Sullivan's Island only half complete, Parker expressed confidence that his warships would easily breach its walls. Optimistically believing he would not even need Clinton's land forces, he wrote to Clinton that after the fort's guns were knocked out, he would "land seamen and marines (which I have practiced for the purpose) under the guns" and that they could "keep possession till you send as many troops as you think proper".

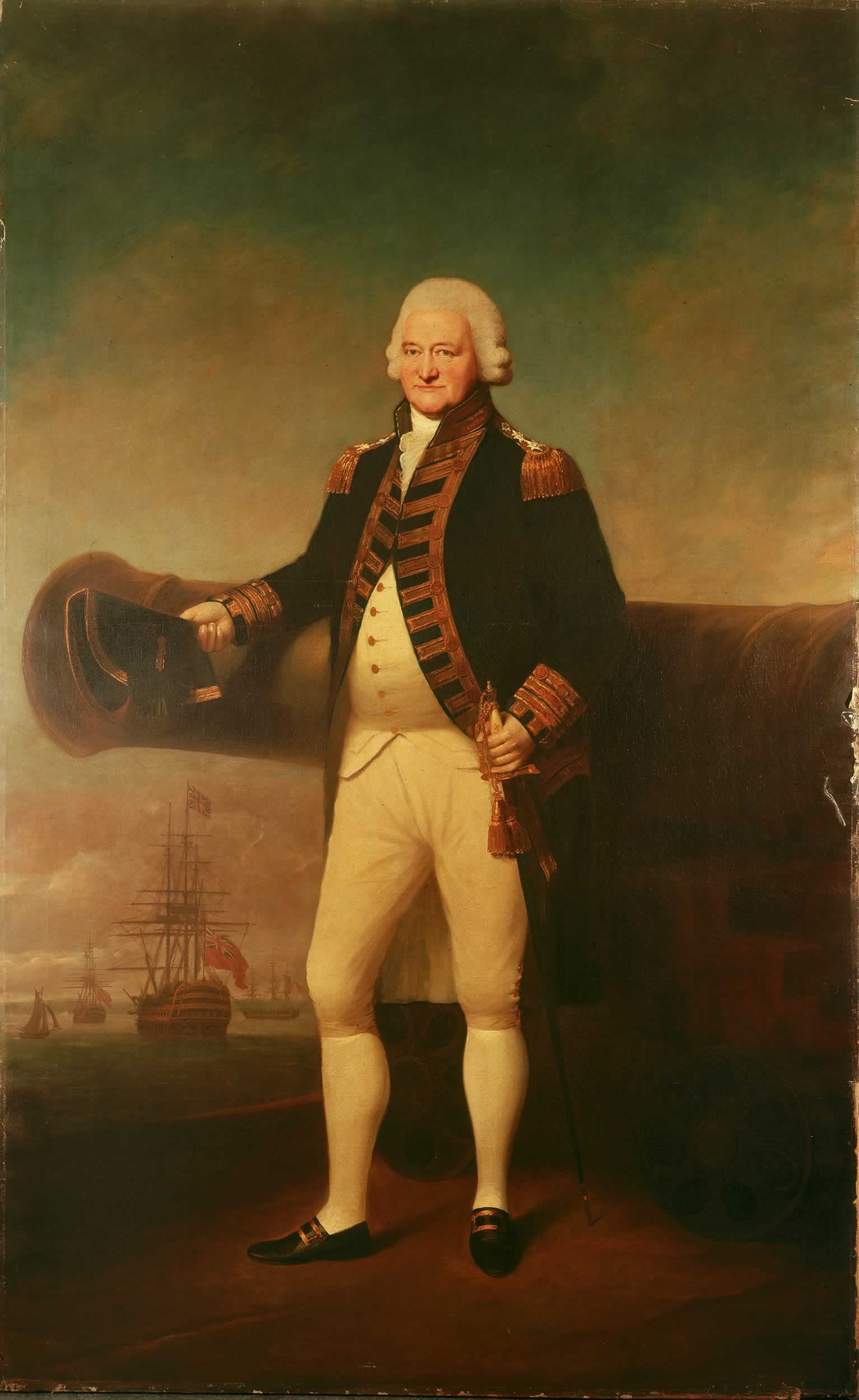
Sir Peter Parker, who commanded the British naval forces at the battle

Parker's squadron was composed of two ships of the line, his flagship HMS Bristol and HMS Experiment, along with the frigates HMS Actaeon, HMS Active, HMS Solebay, HMS Siren, HMS Sphinx, HMS Friend Ship and the bomb vessel HMS Thunder, in total mounting nearly 300 cannon. The army forces in the expedition consisted of the 15th, 28th, 33rd, 37th, 54th, and 57th Regiments of Foot along with part of the 46th Regiment of Foot. On June 7, Clinton issued a proclamation calling on the American forces to lay down their arms. However, the inexperienced defenders fired on the boat sent to deliver it (which was flying a truce flag), and it was not delivered until the next day. That same day, Clinton began landing 2,200 troops on Long Island. The intent was that these troops would wade across the channel (now known as Breach Inlet) between Long and Sullivan's, which the British believed to be sufficiently shallow to do so, while the squadron bombarded Fort Sullivan.

General Lee responded to the British landing with several actions. He began reinforcing positions on the mainland in case the British were intending to launch an attack directly on Charles Town. He also attempted to build a bridge of boats to provide an avenue of retreat for the fort's garrison, but this failed because there were not enough boats to bridge the roughly one mile (1.6 km) channel separating the island from Charles Town; the unwillingness of Moultrie and Rutledge to support the effort may also have played a role. The Americans also constructed an entrenchment at the northern end of Sullivan's Island, which was manned by more than 750 men and three small cannons, and began to fortify a guard post at Haddrell's Point on the mainland opposite Fort Sullivan.

General Clinton encountered the first major problem of the attack plan on June 17. An attempt to wade the channel between the two islands established that part of the channel was at least shoulder-deep, too deep for troops to cross even without the prospect of enemy opposition. He considered using boats to ferry the troops across, but the Americans, with timely advice from General Lee, adopted a strong defensive position that was virtually impossible to bombard from ships or the Long Island position. As a result, the British and American forces faced each other across the channel, engaging in occasional and largely inconsequential cannon fire at long range. Clinton reported that this meant that Parker would have "the glory of being defeated alone." The attack was originally planned for June 24, but bad weather and contrary wind conditions prompted Parker to call it off for several days.

== Order of battle ==
=== Continentals ===
- Southern Army, commanded by Major General Charles Lee (ca. 1,965 men)
  - Fort Sullivan Garrison Commander, Colonel William Moultrie
  - 2nd South Carolina Regiment, commanded by Colonel William Moultrie, 413 men
  - 3rd South Carolina Regiment (Rangers), commanded by Colonel William Thomson, 330 men
  - North Carolina Continentals, commanded by Lieutenant Colonel Clark, 200 men
  - Virginia Continentals, commanded by Colonel Peter Muhlenberg, 700 men (only 500 of which were Virginians)
  - South Carolina State Troops, commanded by Colonel Daniel Horry, 200 men
  - Raccoon Company of Riflemen, commanded by Captain John Allston, 50 men
  - Detachment of South Carolina Militia, 50 men
  - Detachment, 4th South Carolina Regiment (Artillery), 22 men

=== British ===
- Parker's Flotilla, North American Station, commanded by Commodore Sir Peter Parker
  - HMS Bristol (50; flagship), commanded by Captain John Morris
  - HMS Experiment (50), commanded by Captain Alexander Scott
  - HMS Active (28), commanded by Captain William Williams
  - HMS Solebay (28), commanded by Captain Thomas Symonds
  - HMS Actaeon (28), commanded by Captain Christopher Atkins
  - HMS Siren (28), commanded by Captain Tobias Furneau
  - HMS Sphinx (20), commanded by Captain Anthony Hunt
  - HMS Friendship (22), commanded by Captain Charles Hope
  - HMS Ranger (8), commanded by James Reid
  - HMS Saint Lawrence, commanded by Lieutenant John Graves
  - HMS Thunder (8) – bomb ketch
  - 30 troopships

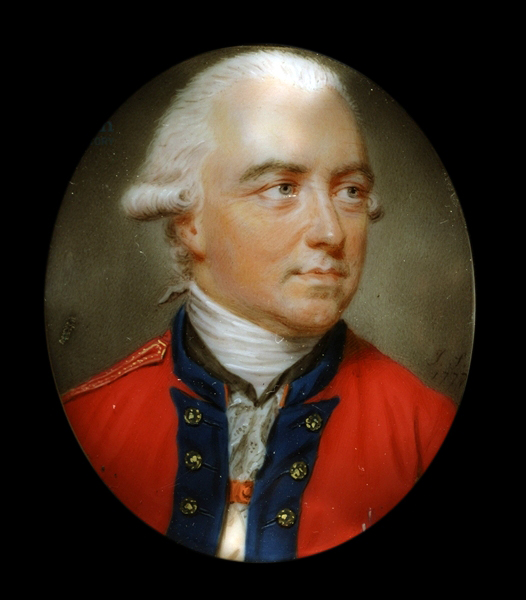
Henry Clinton, who commanded the British army forces at the battle

- Clinton's Division, commanded by Major general Sir Henry Clinton (2,200 regulars, 600-700 Royal Marines and Sailors)
  - 15th Regiment of Foot
  - 28th Regiment of Foot
  - 33rd Regiment of Foot
  - 37th Regiment of Foot
  - 44th Regiment of Foot (Grenadiers and Light Infantry companies only)
  - 46th Regiment of Foot
  - 54th Regiment of Foot
  - 57th Regiment of Foot
  - 70th Regiment of Foot
  - 2 x Companies, 2nd Battalion, Royal Highland Emigrants

== Battle ==
1776 map of the battle

On the morning of June 28, Fort Sullivan was defended by Moultrie, commanding the 2nd South Carolina Regiment and a company of the 4th South Carolina Artillery, numbering 435 men. At around 09:00 that morning, a British ship fired a signal gun indicating all was ready for the attack. Less than an hour later, nine warships had sailed into positions facing the fort. Thunder and Friendship anchored about 1.5 miles (2.4 km) from the fort while Parker took Active, Bristol, Experiment, and Solebay to a closer position about 400 yards (370 m) from Sullivan's Island, where they anchored facing broadside to the fort. Each of these ships began to fire upon the fort when it reached its position, and the defenders returned the fire. Although many of Thunder's shots landed in or near the fort, they had little effect; according to Moultrie, "We had a morass in the middle, that swallowed them up instantly, and those that fell in the sand in and about the fort, were immediately buried".

Thunder's role in the action was also relatively short-lived; she had anchored too far away from the fort, and the overloading of her mortars with extra powder to increase their range eventually led to them breaking out of their mounts. Owing to shortage of gunpowder, Moultrie's men were deliberate in the pace of their gunfire, and only a few officers actually aimed the cannons. They also fired in small volleys, four cannon at a time. One British observer wrote, "Their fire was surprisingly well served" and it was "slow, but decisive indeed; they were very cool and took care not to fire except their guns were exceedingly well directed." Due to severe shortage of black powder a group of men led by "The Swamp Fox" Francis Marion headed into Charles Town and acquired more black powder to be able to continue the battle. Due to this action and sinkage of a British Frigate the battle was considered a victory.

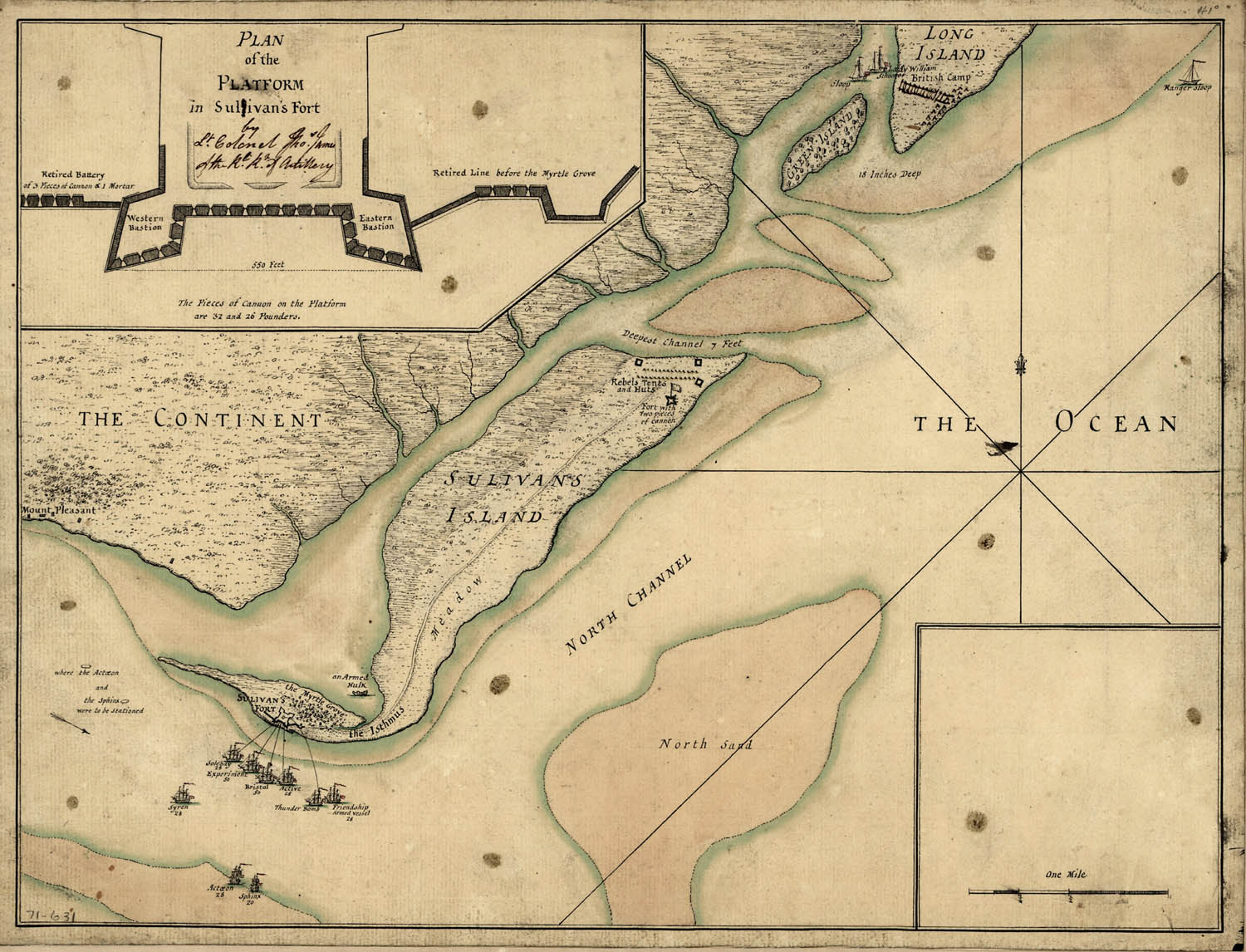
Map of the battle made by a British engineer

General Clinton began movements to cross over to the northern end of Sullivan's Island. Assisted by two sloops of war, the flotilla of longboats carrying his troops came under fire from Colonel William Thomson's defenses. Facing a withering barrage of grape shot and rifle fire, Clinton abandoned the attempt. Around noon the frigates Sphinx, Syren, and Actaeon were sent on a roundabout route, avoiding some shoals, to take a position from which they could enfilade the fort's main firing platform and also cover one of the main escape routes from the fort. However, all three ships grounded on an uncharted sandbar, and the riggings of Actaeon and Sphinx became entangled in the process. The British managed to refloat Sphinx and Syren, but Acteon remained grounded, having moved too far onto the submerged sandbar. Consequently, none of these ships reached its intended position, a piece of good fortune not lost on Moultrie: "Had these three ships effected their purpose, they would have enfiladed us in such a manner, as to have driven us from our guns."

At the fort, Moultrie ordered his men to concentrate their fire on the two large men-of-war, Bristol and Experiment, which took hit after hit from the fort's guns. Chain shot fired at Bristol eventually destroyed much of her rigging and severely damaged both the main- and mizzenmasts. One round hit her quarterdeck, slightly wounding Parker in the knee and thigh. The shot also tore off part of his britches, leaving his backside exposed. By mid-afternoon, the defenders were running out of gunpowder, and their fire was briefly suspended. However, Lee sent more ammunition and gunpowder over from the mainland, and the defenders resumed firing at the British ships; Lee even briefly visited the fort late in the day, telling Moultrie, "I see you are doing very well here, you have no occasion for me, I will go up to the town again." Parker eventually sought to destroy the fort's walls with persistent broadside cannonades. This strategy failed due to the spongy nature of the palmetto wood used in its constructions; the structure would quiver, and it absorbed the cannonballs rather than splintering. The exchange continued until around 21:00, when darkness forced a cessation of hostilities, and the squadron finally withdrew out of range.

William Jasper holding the Liberty flag during the battle

At one point during the battle, the flag Moultrie had designed and raised over the fort was shot down. Sergeant William Jasper reportedly ran to the battlement and raised the flag again, holding it up and rallying the troops until a flag stand could be provided. He was credited by Moultrie with reviving the troops' spirits, and later given commendations for bravery. A painting of this event (pictured above) depicts Jasper's actions. Counting casualties, Parker reported 40 sailors killed and 71 wounded aboard Bristol, which was hit more than 70 times with much damage to the hull, yards, and rigging. Experiment was also badly damaged with 23 sailors killed and 56 wounded. Active and Solebay reported 15 casualties each. The Americans reported their casualties at only 12 killed and 25 wounded. The following morning, the British, unable to drag the grounded Acteon off the sandbar, set fire to the ship to prevent her from falling into enemy hands. Patriots in small boats sailed out to the burning ship, fired cannons at the British ships, took what stores and loot they could, and retreated shortly before the ship's powder magazine exploded.

== Aftermath ==
The British did not attempt to take the fort again. Within days of the battle, the residents of the Charles Town learned of the signing of the United States Declaration of Independence in Philadelphia. The British troops were reembarked on their transports, and on July 21 the British squadron withdrew northward to help the main British army in its campaign against New York City. To add insult to injury, one of the British transports grounded off Long Island and was captured by Patriot forces.

The British did not return to Charles Town until 1780, when Clinton led another expeditionary force which successfully besieged the city and captured an entire American army. Until the South again became a focus of the war in late 1778, its states provided military supplies to the northern war effort and produced trade goods that brought in valuable hard currency to fund the war effort. Parker and Clinton engaged in a war of words after the battle, each seeking to cast the blame on the other for the expedition's failures. Although Clinton was not blamed by the government, popular opinion held him responsible, and Parker was lauded for his personal bravery.

== Legacy ==
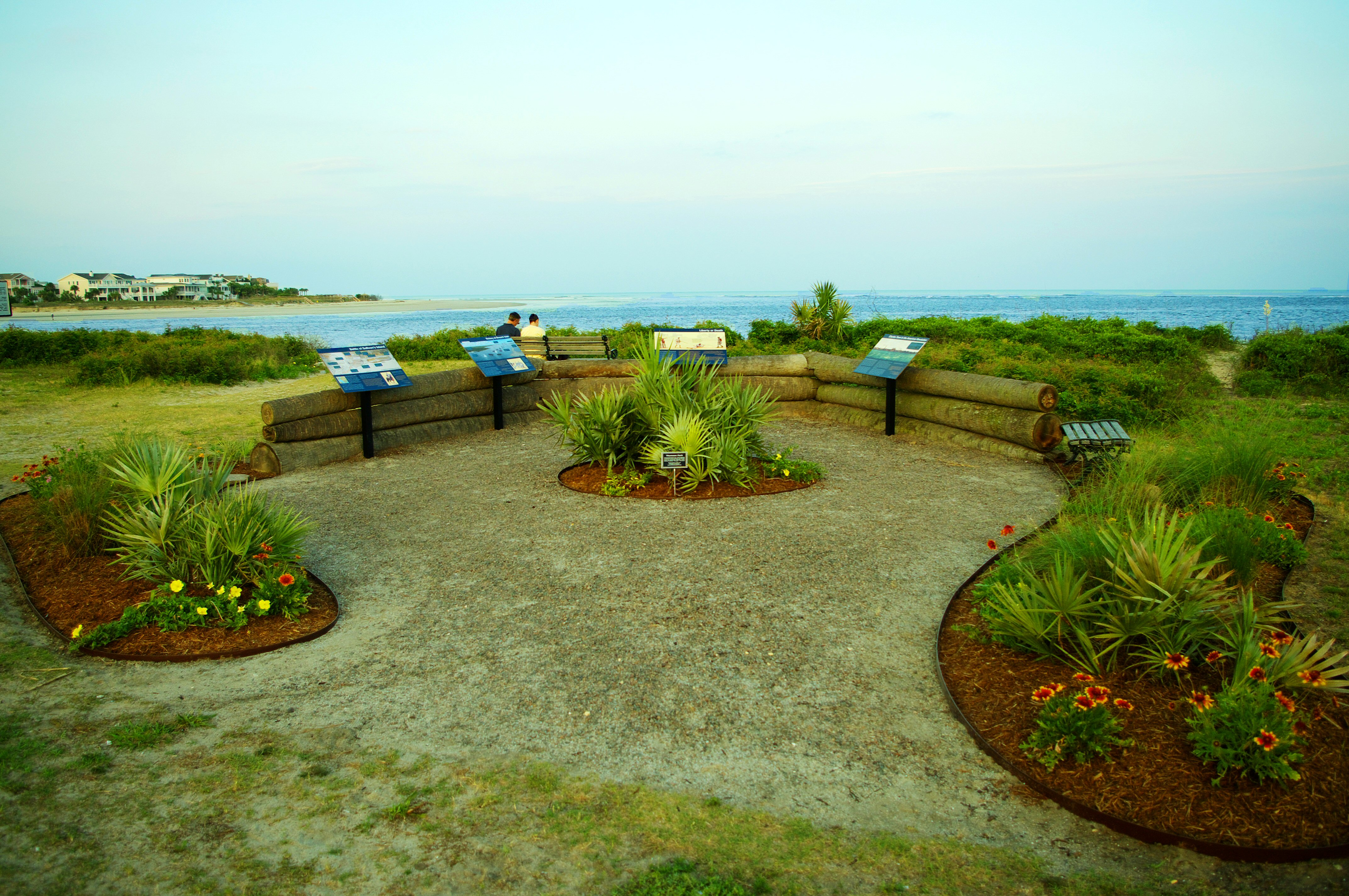
Monument to the battle on Sullivan's Island

Fort Sullivan was renamed Fort Moultrie shortly after the battle to honor Moultrie for his successful defense of the fort and the city of Charles Town, which was renamed Charleston in 1783. Extensively modified in the years after the battle, it was supplanted by Fort Sumter as the principal defense of Charleston prior to the outbreak of the American Civil War. In 1876, to celebrate the centennial, companies from Savannah, Augusta, Macon, Columbia, New York and Boston were invited to Charleston. The site was turned over to the National Park Service in 1960, and is now part of Fort Sumter National Monument.

A small monument to the Battle of Sullivan's Island has been placed at the northeastern tip of the island, overlooking the inlet where General Clinton's soldiers had hoped to cross. The monument includes historical markers describing the events surrounding the engagement. One iconic emblem of the battle was the flag designed by Moultrie. Commissioned by the colonial government, he designed a blue flag with a white crescent in the top left corner, which was flown at the fort during the battle. Despite being shot down during the siege, it was seen as a symbol of this successful defense (and famously raised during victory). It came to be known as the Moultrie flag or Liberty Flag. When Charles Town was reclaimed by American forces at the end of the war, the flag was returned to the city by General Nathanael Greene.

The modern-day flag of South Carolina includes a palmetto, due to the significance of the tree in Moultrie's fortifications. Beginning on the first anniversary of the battle in 1777 South Carolinians have celebrated "Carolina Day" annually to commemorate the victory. Annual local events which take place as part of the day include a parade in downtown Charleston and reenactments at Fort Moultrie on Sullivan's Island.

== See also ==
- American Revolutionary War § Early Engagements. ‘Battle of Sullivan’s Island’ placed in overall sequence and strategic context.
