= 1798 South Carolina gubernatorial election =

- December 18, 1798
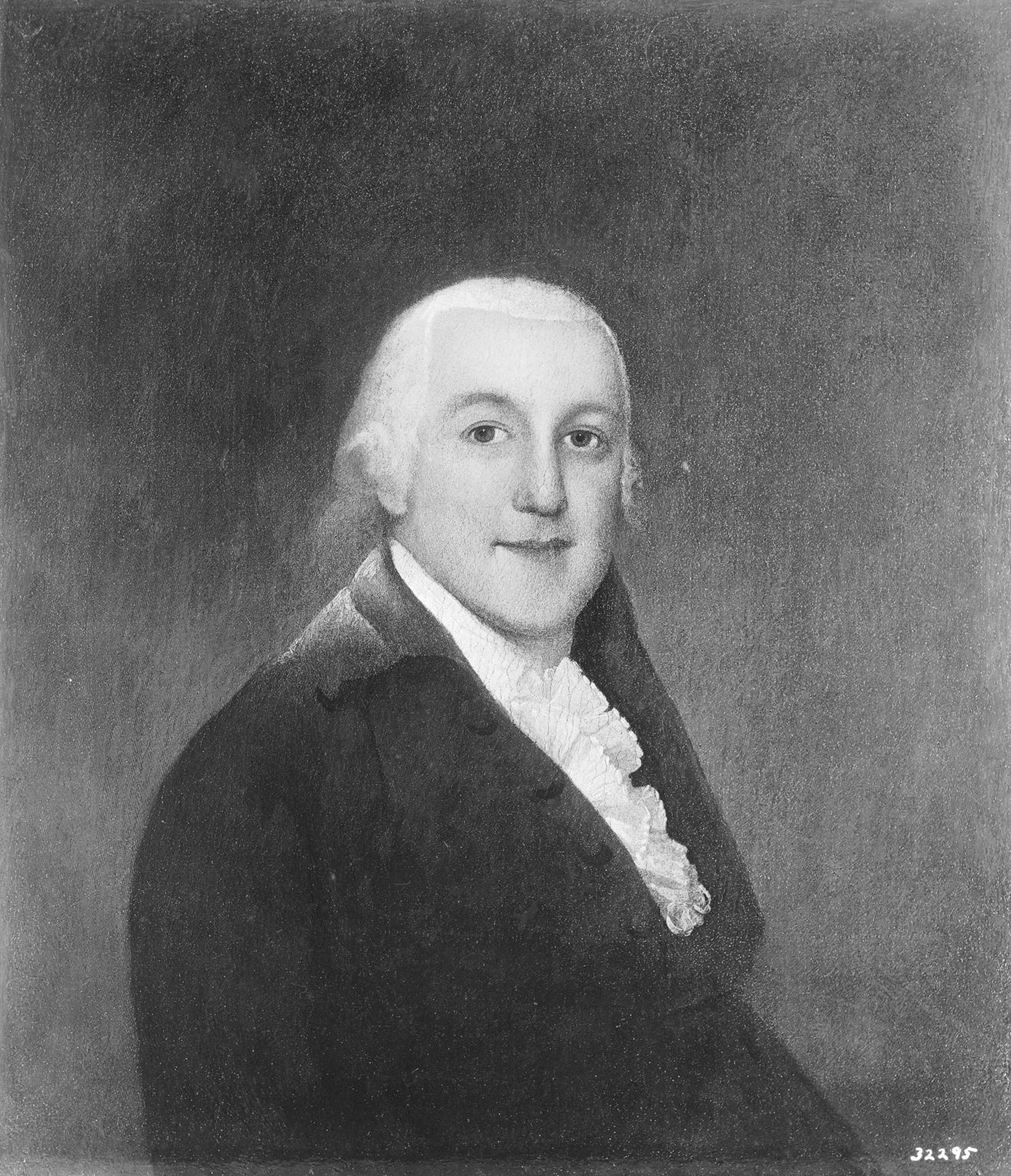

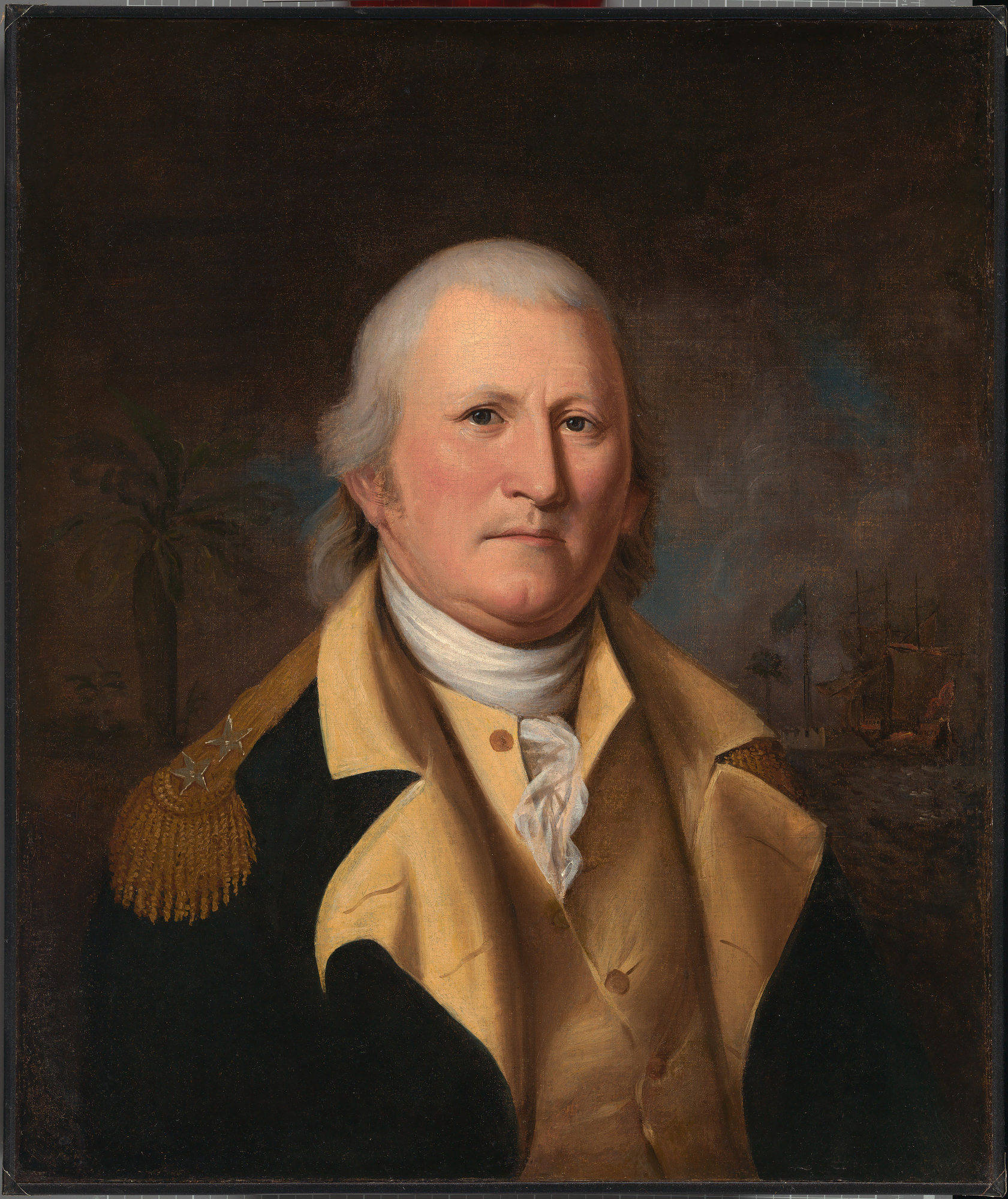
Nominee	Edward Rutledge	William Moultrie
Party	Federalist	Federalist
Popular vote	103	53
Percentage	72.03%	27.97%
Governor before election
Charles Pinckney
Democratic-Republican
Elected Governor
Edward Rutledge
Federalist

The 1798 South Carolina gubernatorial election was held on December 18, 1798, in order to elect the Governor of South Carolina. Federalist candidate and former member of the South Carolina Senate Edward Rutledge was elected by the South Carolina General Assembly against fellow Federalist candidate and former Governor William Moultrie.

== General election ==
On election day, December 18, 1798, Federalist candidate Edward Rutledge was elected by the South Carolina General Assembly by a margin of 63 votes against his opponent fellow Federalist candidate and former Governor William Moultrie, thereby gaining Federalist control over the office of Governor. Rutledge was sworn in as the 39th Governor of South Carolina on December 19, 1798.

=== Results ===
South Carolina gubernatorial election, 1798
Party	Candidate	Votes	%
Federalist	Edward Rutledge	103	72.03%
Federalist	William Moultrie	40	27.97%
Total votes		143	100.00%
Federalist gain from Democratic-Republican			
