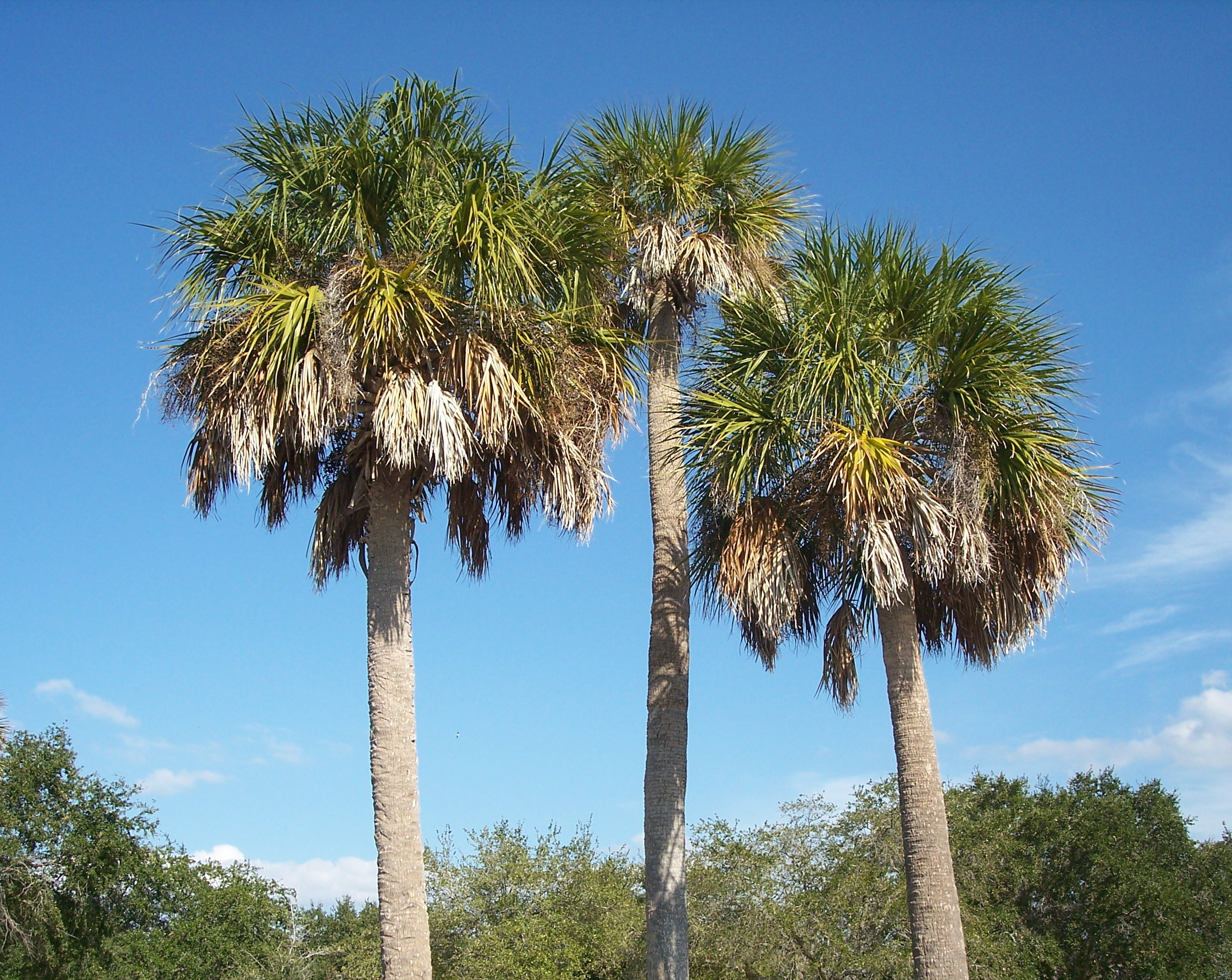
- Sabal palmetto in habitat, Florida

Conservation status
- Least Concern (IUCN 3.1)

- Secure (NatureServe)

Scientific classification
- Kingdom: Plantae
- Clade: Tracheophytes
- Clade: Angiosperms
- Clade: Monocots
- Clade: Commelinids
- Order: Arecales
- Family: Arecaceae
- Genus: Sabal
- Species: S. palmetto

Binomial name
- Sabal palmetto (Walt.) Lodd.
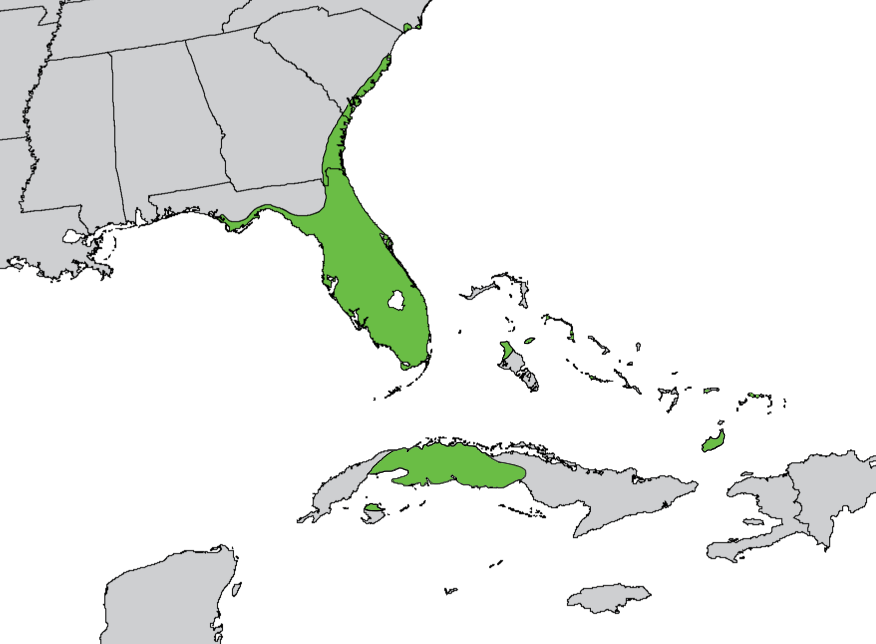
- Natural range (excluding Texas and the Yucatán Peninsula)

Synonyms
- Synonymy: Corypha palmetto Walter; Inodes palmetto (Walter) O.F.Cook; Inodes schwarzii O.F.Cook; Chamaerops palmetto (Walter) Michx.; Corypha umbraculifera Jacq. 1800, not L. 1753; Sabal blackburniana Schult. & Schult.f.; Inodes blackburniana (Schult. & Schult.f.) O.F.Cook; Inodes schwarzii O.F.Cook; Sabal palmetto var. bahamensis Becc.; Sabal parviflora Becc.; Sabal schwarzii (O.F.Cook) Becc.; Sabal jamesiana Small; Sabal bahamensis (Becc.) L.H.Bailey; Sabal viatoris L.H.Bailey

= Sabal palmetto =

Species of plant

Sabal palmetto (/ˈseɪbəl/, SAY-bəl), also known as cabbage palm, cabbage palmetto, sabal palm, palmetto palm, blue palmetto, Carolina palmetto, common palmetto, and swamp cabbage, is one of 15 species of palmetto palm. It is native to the Southeast United States Coastal Plain, the Yucatán Peninsula in Mexico, and the West Indies.

== Description ==
Sabal palmetto grows up to 24 m (80 ft) tall, with the tallest on record measuring at 93 feet tall. Starting at half to two-thirds the height, the tree develops into a rounded, costapalmate fan of numerous leaflets. A costapalmate leaf has a definite costa (midrib), unlike the typical palmate or fan leaf, but the leaflets are arranged radially like in a palmate leaf. All costapalmate leaves are about 5 mm (1/4 in) across, produced in large compound panicles up to 2.5 m (8 ft) in radius, extending out beyond the leaves. The fruit is a black drupe about 1.3 cm (1/2 in) long containing a single seed. It is extremely salt-tolerant and is often seen growing on the coastal plain and along the coast of the Atlantic Ocean and the Gulf of Mexico.

== Distribution and habitat ==
Sabal palmetto is native to the subtropical coastal regions of the American states of Florida, Georgia, South Carolina, and southeastern North Carolina. It is also cultivated elsewhere in the Southeastern US, in some areas of southeastern Virginia, southwestern Alabama, and southeastern Mississippi. It can also be found alongside Cuba's northern coast (from Havana to Matanzas), the Turks and Caicos, the Yucatán Peninsula in Mexico, and the Bahamas.

The species is hardy to the US Department of Agriculture's zone 8a, and has been reported to have some cold hardness down to 8.6 °F or −13.0 °C, but needs hot and humid summers to grow well. Maintenance of the cabbage palm tree is very easy and very adaptable. The cabbage palmetto is known to tolerate drought, standing water and brackish water. Even though this palm is drought-tolerant, it thrives on regular light watering and regular feeding. It is highly tolerant of salt winds, but not saltwater flooding.

== Cultivation ==
Sabal palmetto is a popular landscape plant in the subtropical climates of the Gulf and south Atlantic states, mostly from coastal regions of North Carolina to Florida. Sabal palm is used extensively around beach and resort areas along the lower East Coast because of its tolerance of salt spray and drought. Because of their relatively long establishment period and prevalence on southern ranchlands, few, if any are grown from seed in nurseries. Instead, established plants are dug in the wild with small rootballs since virtually all the severed roots die and must be replaced by new roots in the new location. Most leaves are removed during transplanting to reduce transpiration. Cabbage palms have excellent hurricane resistance, but are frequently overpruned to supposedly lower wind loads. Sabal palm seed germination excels in hot and humid summer climates.

Most references rate the species as hardy to USDA hardiness zone 8b. A small number of specimens are cultivated beyond the typical regions sabal is known to be cultivated in, including parts of Tennessee, northern Virginia, and along the middle Atlantic coast from Maryland to coastal New Jersey and coastal Connecticut. A long term specimen (covered with frost cloth in winter) grows in favorable microclimate (zone 7a/b) at the University of Bridgeport, Connecticut, since 2009.

The cabbage palm is remarkably resistant to fire, floods, coastal conditions, cold, high winds, and drought. Despite this, mortality has been caused by Texas phoenix palm decline (now known as Lethal Bronzing Disease), a phytoplasma found on the west coast of Florida in 2006.

Sabal palmetto trunks appear in two different conditions, which can be confusing (see photo). When leaves die, the leaf bases typically persist for a while, creating a spiky, "basketweave" effect. These remnant leaf bases are called "bootjacks" or "boots", for short. The name stems from the "Y" shape that was reminiscent of devices used to aid individuals in removing boots. Transplanted palms are sometimes deliberately shorn of these bootjacks. Taller specimens are more likely to have lost their bootjacks and appear relatively smooth and columnar. The loss of bootjacks is a natural, if poorly understood, phenomenon, as the palm does not create a leaf abscission zone so the loss of the leaf bases results from some other physical or biological process.

In 1998, a new mutant form of S. palmetto was discovered in southwest Florida, and named as a cultivar, Sabal palmetto 'Lisa'. This cultivar has unusually thick and leathery, largely fused leaflets that give the palm a unique and appealing appearance. Over 60% of the seedlings have the same leaf characteristics as the parent plant and Sabal palmetto 'Lisa' has been popularized in the nursery trade in Florida over the last 20 years and proven to be as resistant to heat, wind, cold, drought, and neglect as the common form while keeping its shape.

Outside of the United States, sabal palmetto is also cultivated in some areas of the Caucasus region of Eastern Europe, primarily in cities such as Sochi, Sukhumi, and Batumi, though this is less common than elsewhere and primarily limited to microclimates. It is also grown in some coastal regions of Japan and South Korea.

== Uses ==
The growing heart of the new fronds, also known as the terminal bud, gives the tree its "cabbage" name, since this is extracted as a food and tastes like other undifferentiated plant meristem tissue, such as the heart of a cabbage or artichoke. It is one of several palm species that are sometimes used to make heart of palm salad. Heart of palm was commonly eaten by Native Americans. However, extracting the heart kills this species of palm, because the terminal bud is the only point from which the palm can grow, so without this bud, the palm is not able to replace old leaves and eventually dies.

The cabbage-like terminal bud has been eaten as hearts of palm. The bristles on the sheaths of young leaves have been made into scrubbing brushes. The trunks have been used as wharf piles. On June 28, 1776, Charleston patriots under William Moultrie made a fort of palmetto trunks and from it defended successfully against the British in the Revolutionary War.

The fronds of the sabal palmetto traditionally were weaved into multiple items with multiple uses, such as a basket, hats, and also primitive construction methods.

The fruit is edible raw, and the seeds can be ground into flour.

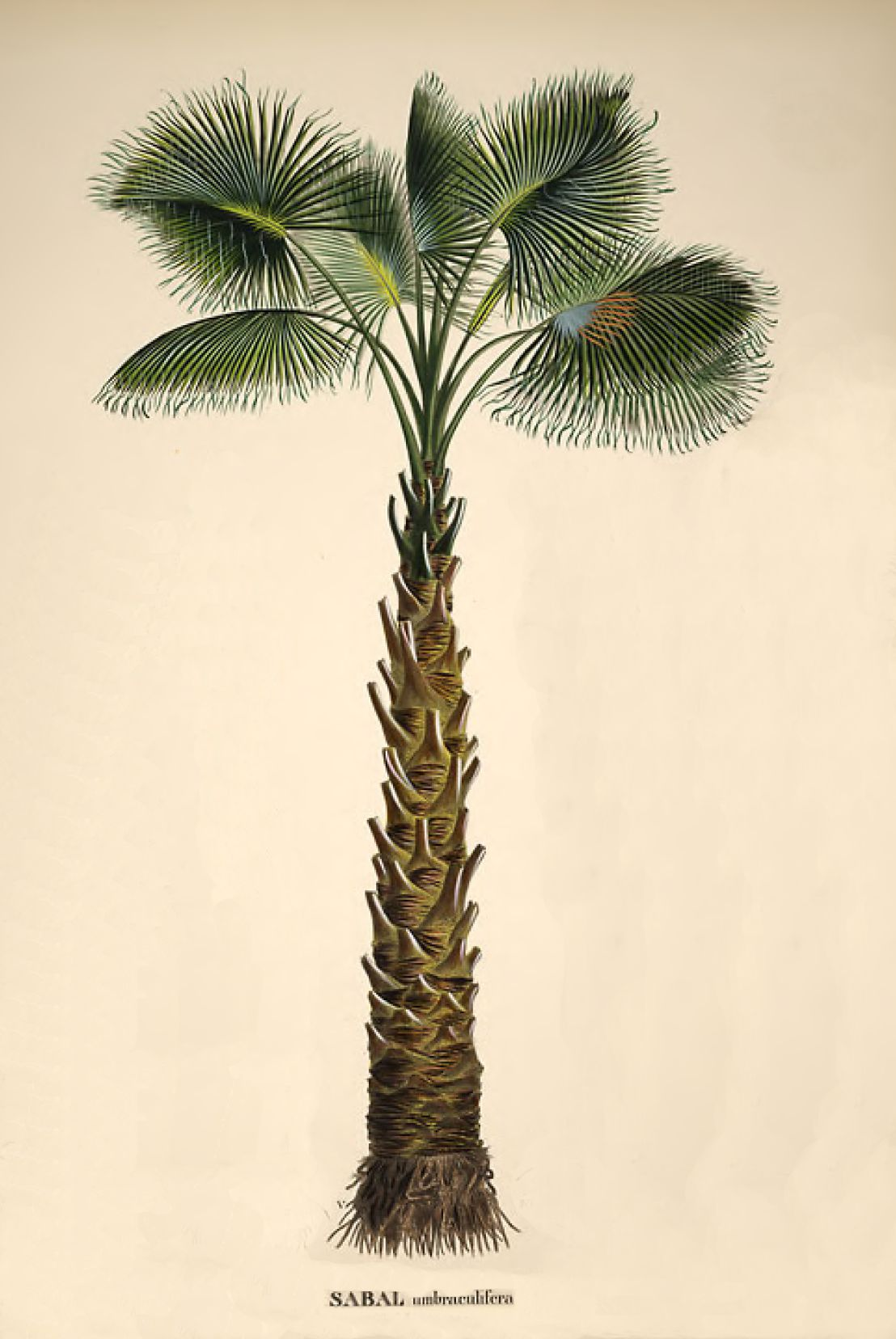
Sabal palmetto from Carl Friedrich Philipp von Martius's Historia naturalis palmarum

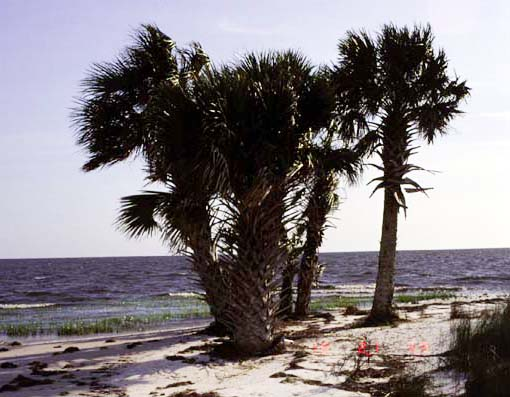
On Virginia Beach, Virginia

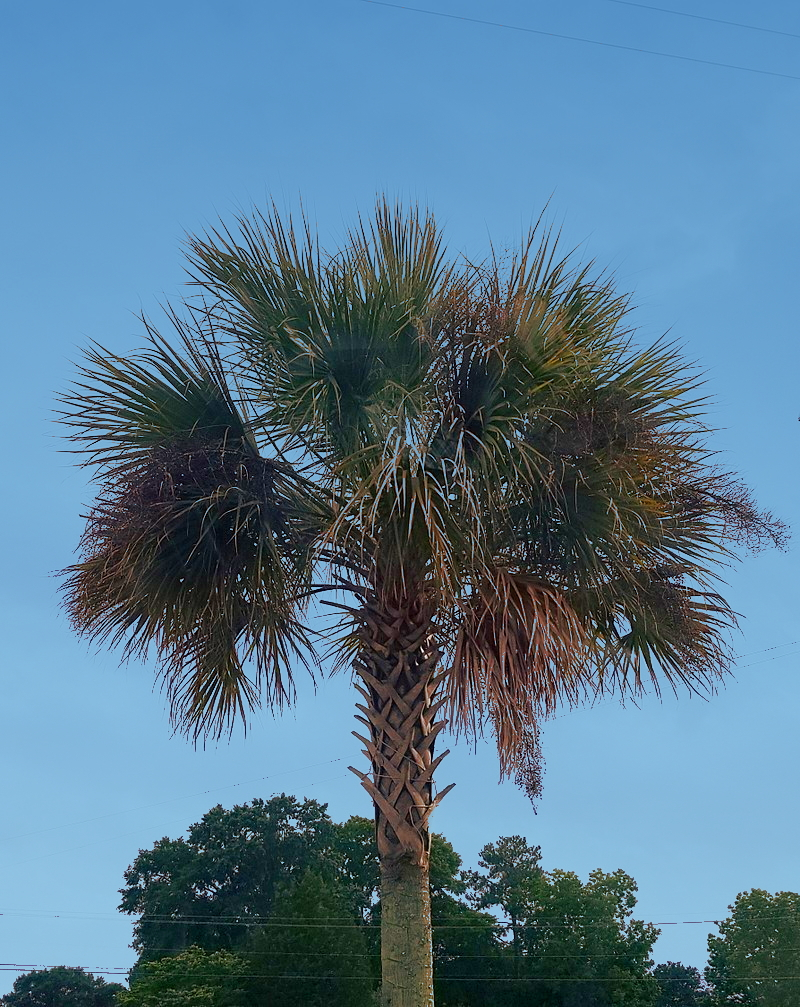
In Enterprise, Alabama

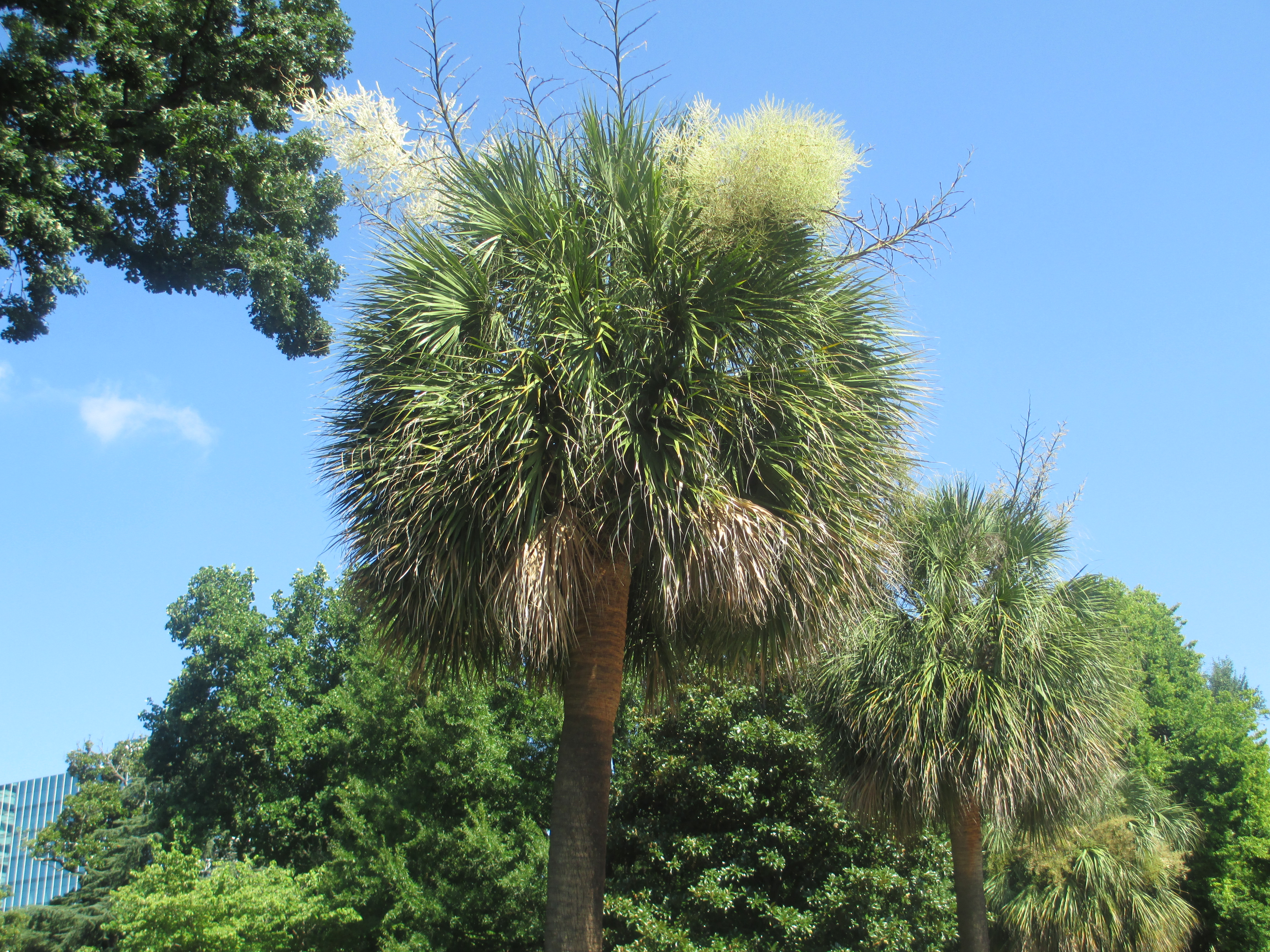
Growing near state capitol in Columbia, South Carolina

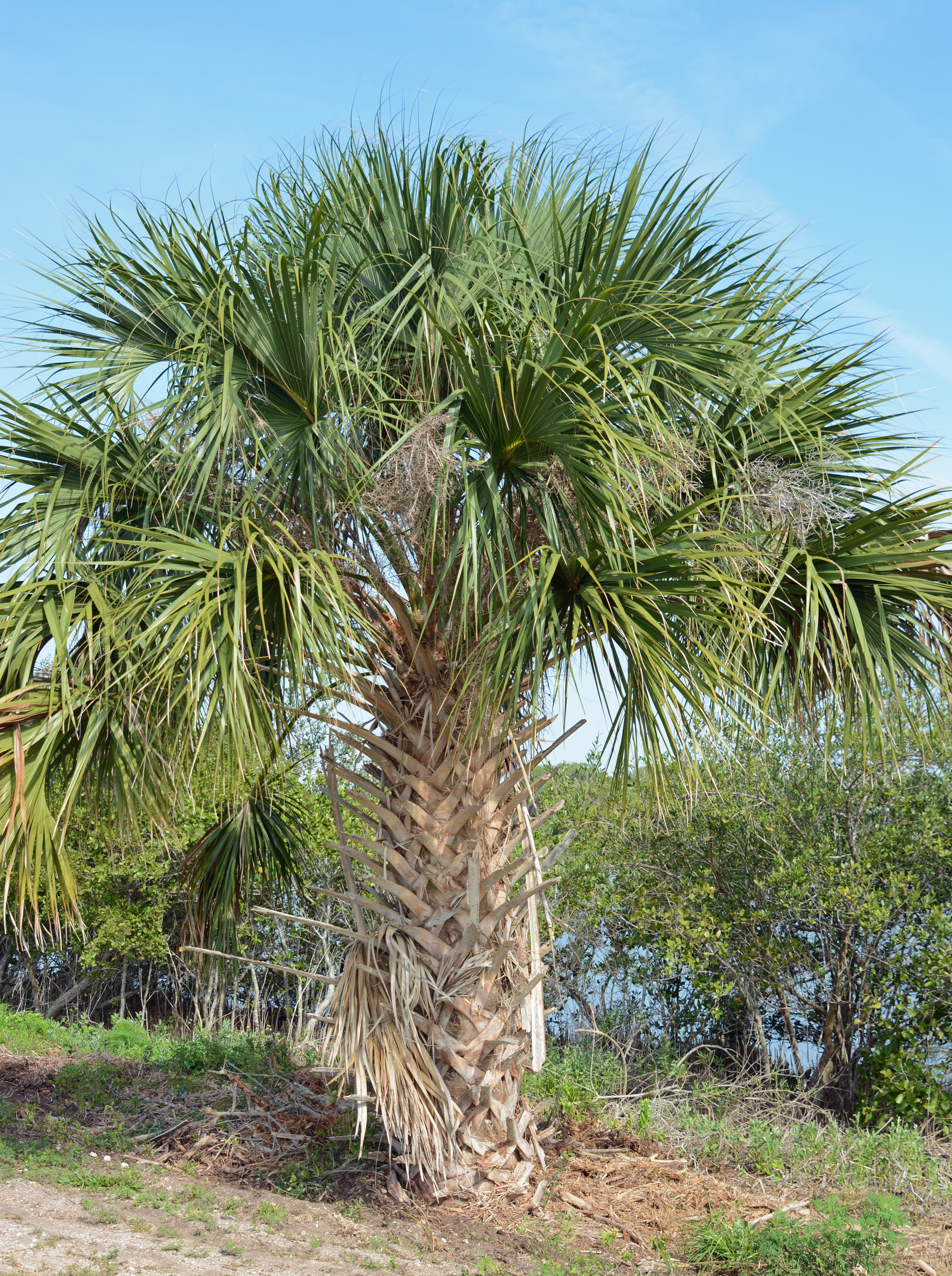
On the Canaveral National Seashore, Florida

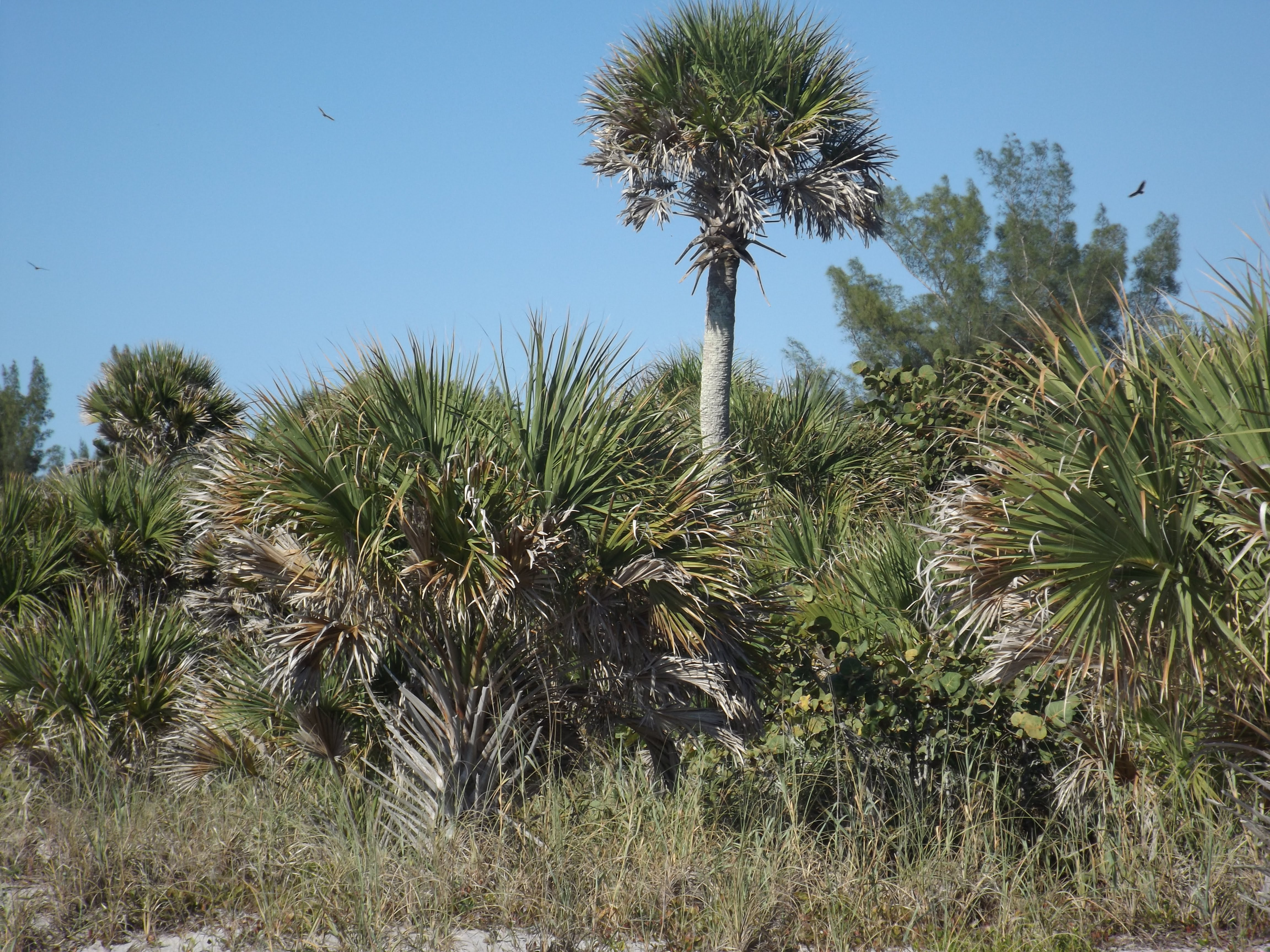
In beach habitat, Manasota Key, Florida

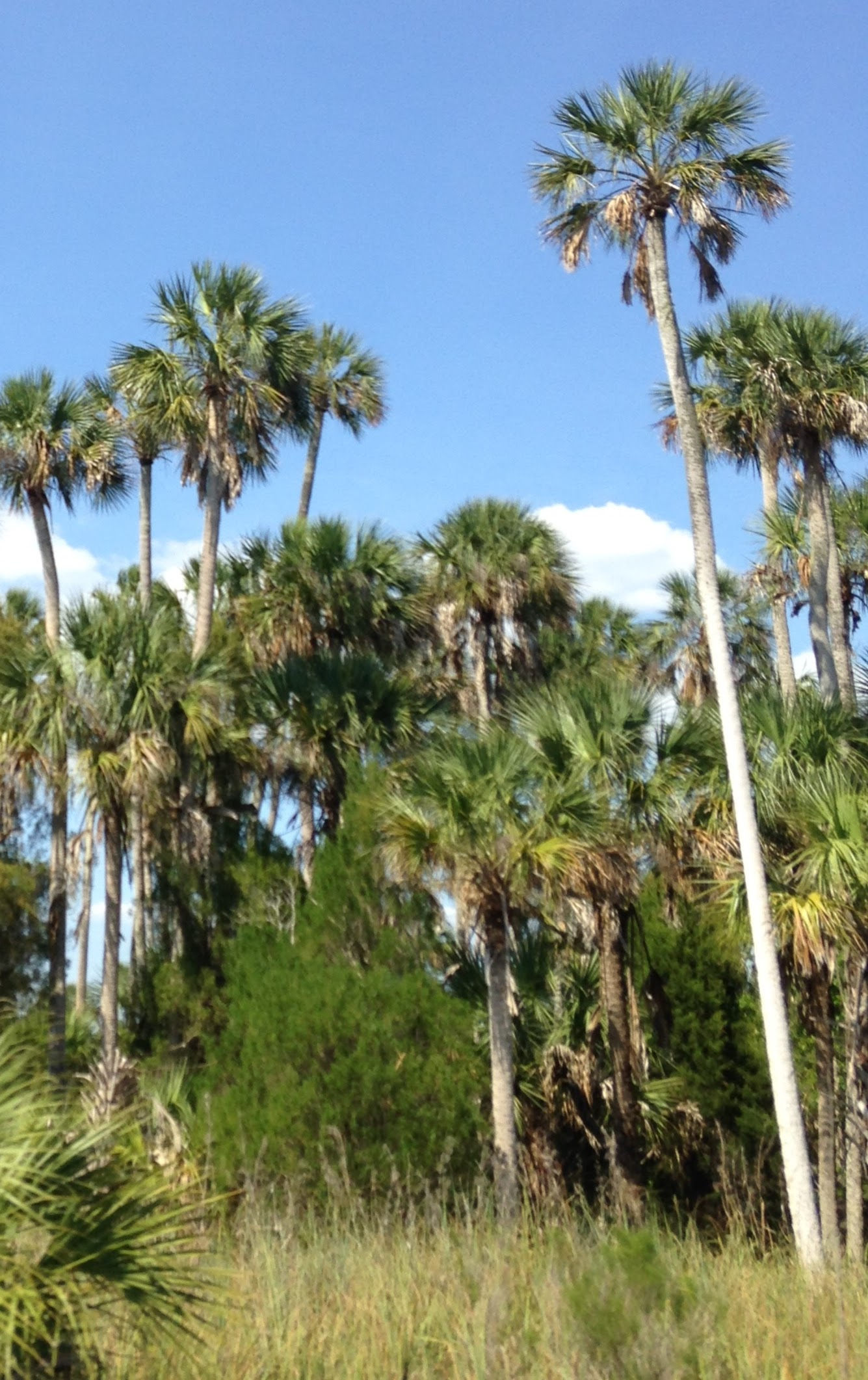
Wild specimens

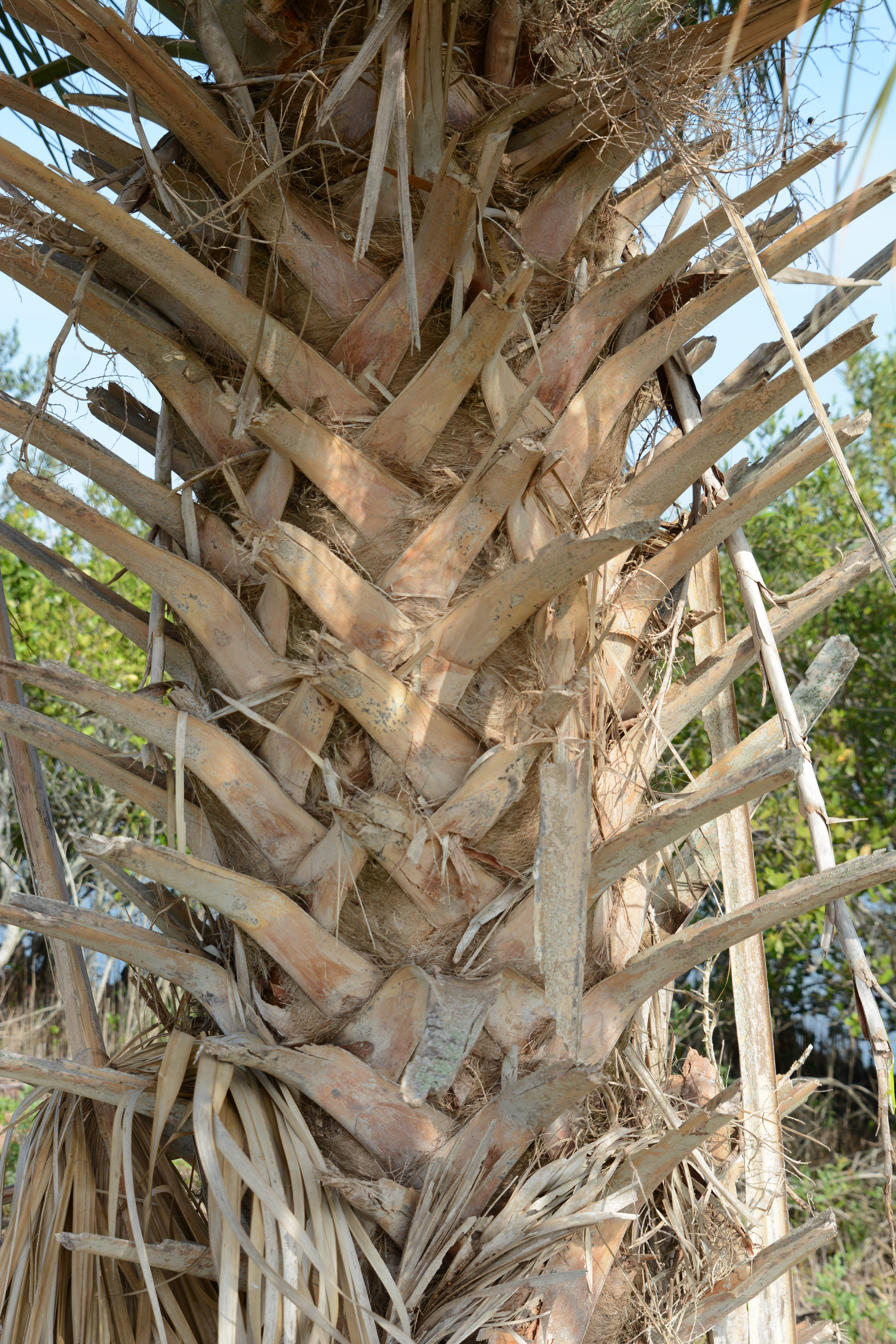
Bootjacks

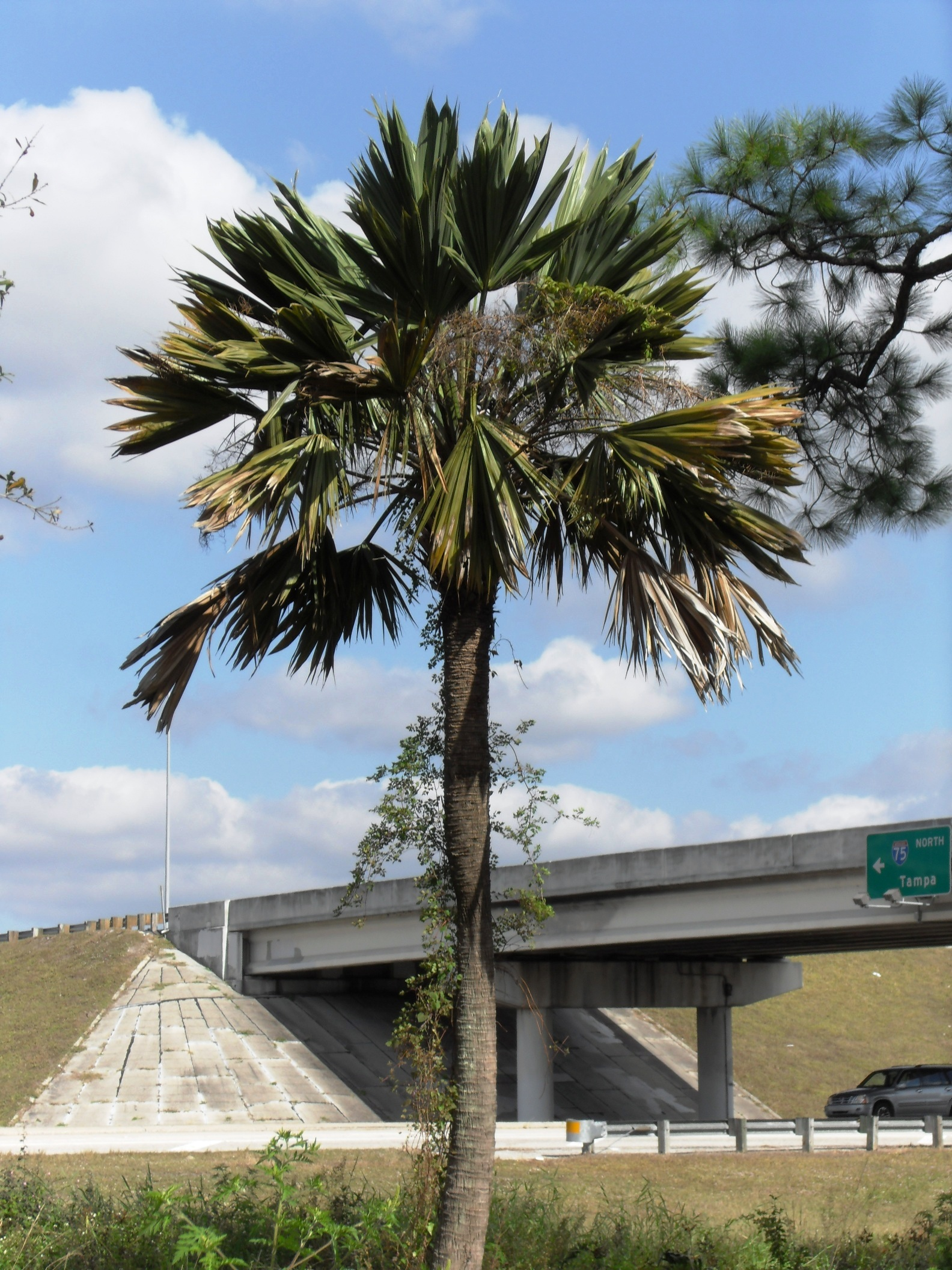
S. palmetto 'Lisa' in Fort Myers, Florida

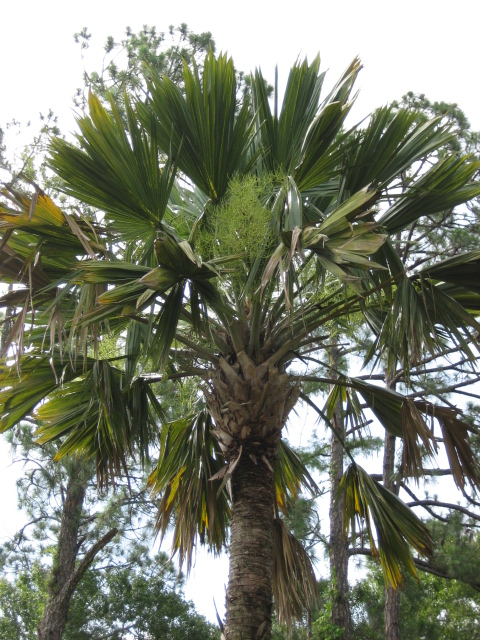
Close-up of S. palmetto 'Lisa' showing leaf character, distinct from that of wild specimens

== Culture ==
The sabal palmetto is the official state tree of both Florida and South Carolina (the latter is nicknamed "The Palmetto State").

The annual football rivalry game between Clemson and South Carolina is known as the "Palmetto Bowl".

A silhouette of S. palmetto appears on the official flag of the US state of South Carolina. The seal of South Carolina also depicts the sabal palmetto.

An image of a palmetto appears on the back of South Carolina's state quarter, which was issued in 2000.

Two images of S. palmetto appear on the official great seal of the State of Florida and the flag of Florida.

seal of South Carolina

Flag of South Carolina

Seal of Florida

Flag of Florida

== See also ==
- Heart of palm
