= Moultrie Flag =

Flag of the American Revolution

Moultrie flag
- Liberty flag
- Adopted: During the American Revolution
- Design: A white crescent in top left, and the word Liberty inscribed on the crescent in a dark blue field.

The Moultrie Flag, also known as the Liberty Flag, was a flag flown in the American Revolutionary War. It features a blue field, a white crescent in the upper left-hand side of the flag, and the word "Liberty" inscribed on the crescent.

== History ==
William Jasper holding the Liberty flag during the Battle of Sullivan's Island

The Liberty flag was designed, by commission, in 1775 by Colonel William Moultrie, to prepare for war with Great Britain. It was flown by his troops at the Battle of Sullivan's Island against a British squadron on June 28, 1776. Fighting back during a ten-hour bombardment and siege, Moultrie's forces (primarily the 2nd South Carolina Regiment) eventually forced the British to withdraw, saving Charleston for the Patriot cause. During the battle, the flag was shot away, but Sergeant William Jasper ran out in the open and hoisted it again, rallying the troops until a new stand could be provided. The story of this event, along with the pivotal role of the battle itself, earned the flag the devotion of South Carolina Patriots, as well as cementing it as a symbol of liberty across the United States.

It therefore became the standard of the South Carolina Patriot militia, and when the war ended with the liberation of Charleston, on December 14, 1782, it was presented by General Nathanael Greene's "Southern Continental & Militia Army," as the first American flag to be displayed in the South. The symbol in the top left corner of the flag is a crescent. While some popular legends have emerged that call the crescent a "gorget" (or officer's symbol worn about the neck), there is no evidence that Moultrie designed the flag with a gorget in mind. Moultrie's own writings and those of his contemporaries always refer to the symbol as a "crescent."

== Heritage ==
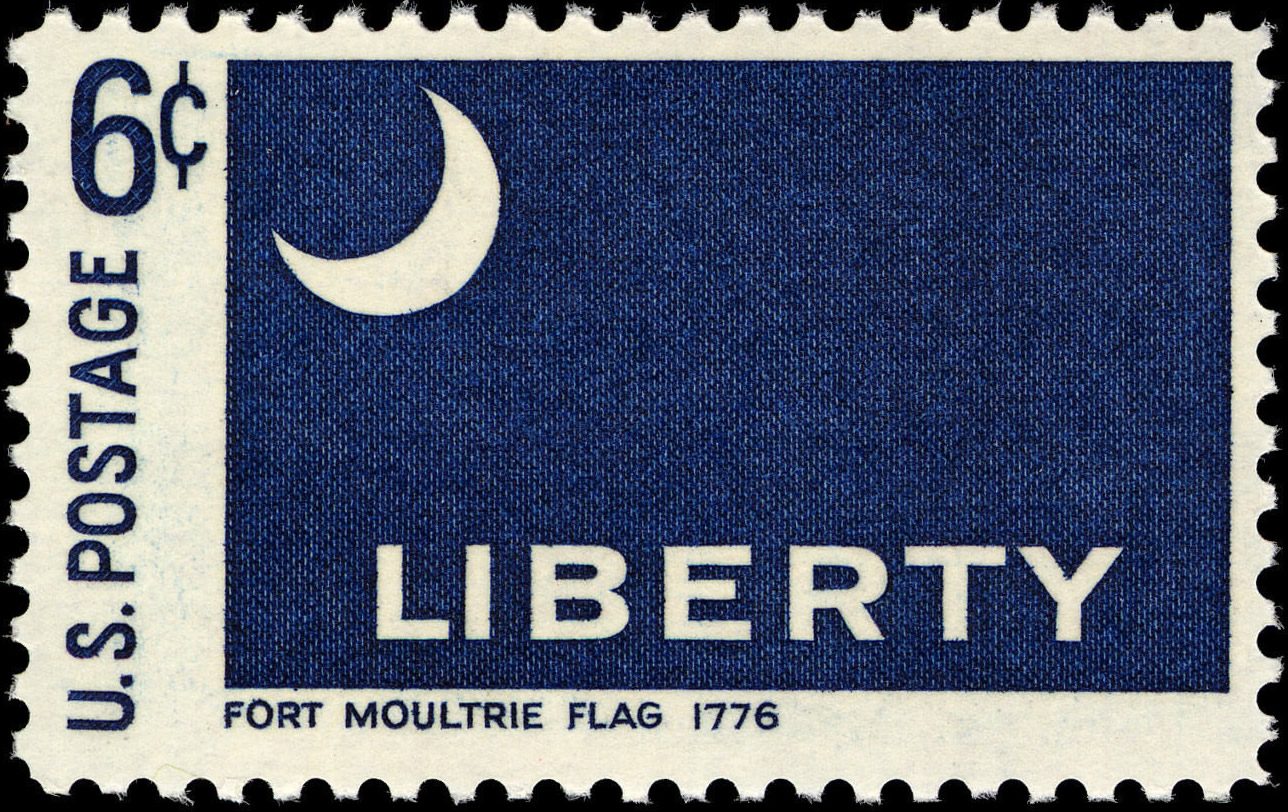
The Moultrie Flag as depicted in the 1968 "Historic Flag" stamp series.

Iconic to the state of South Carolina as a symbol of freedom and the Revolution, eventually this was used as the foundation for the state's own flag. The fort was renamed Fort Moultrie, and the flag is sometimes referred to as the Fort Moultrie Flag. It is occasionally rendered with the word liberty separately in white, along the lower center of the flag, while some paintings exclude the wording entirely.

In addition to being the basis for South Carolina's flag, it is the flag of Moultrie County, Illinois and Moultrie, Georgia

The flag was featured on a 1968 US stamp. The reraising of the flag was commemorated on the South Carolina quarter of the America the Beautiful quarters.

The flag is flown by the USS Paul Hamilton (DDG-60) to honor the ship's namesake Paul Hamilton, a South Carolinian who was a Revolutionary War soldier, the United States’ third Secretary of the Navy, and the 42nd governor of South Carolina.

First flag raised over Fort Johnson, 1775

Variant of the Moultrie flag with the word "Liberty" written on the bottom.

Variant of the Moultrie flag with out the word "Liberty."

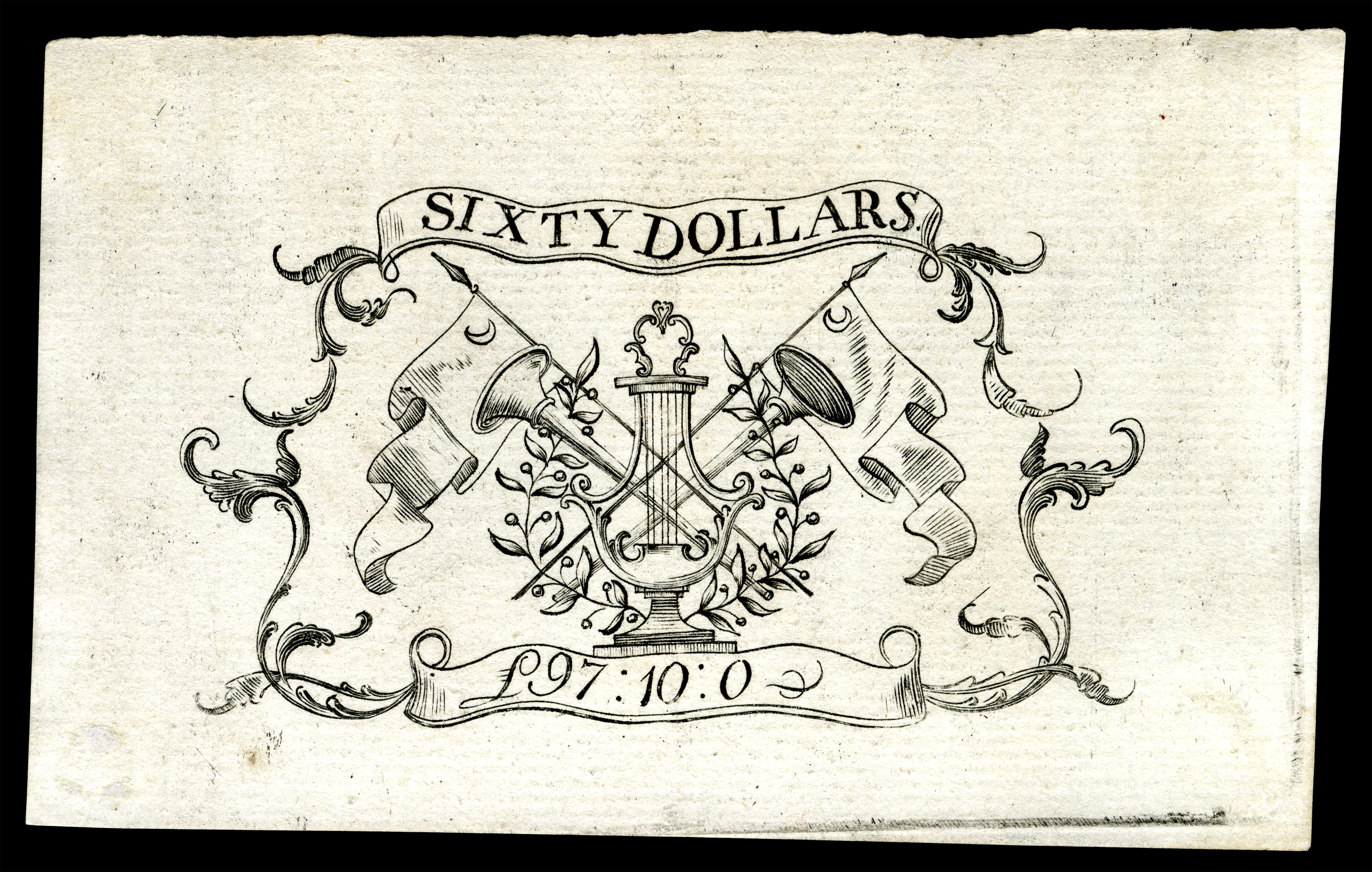
The Moultrie flag depicted on a $60 colonial currency from South Carolina.

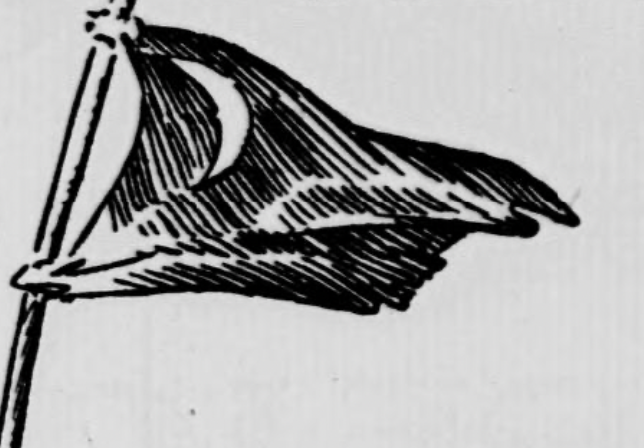
Illustration of the flag from 1910

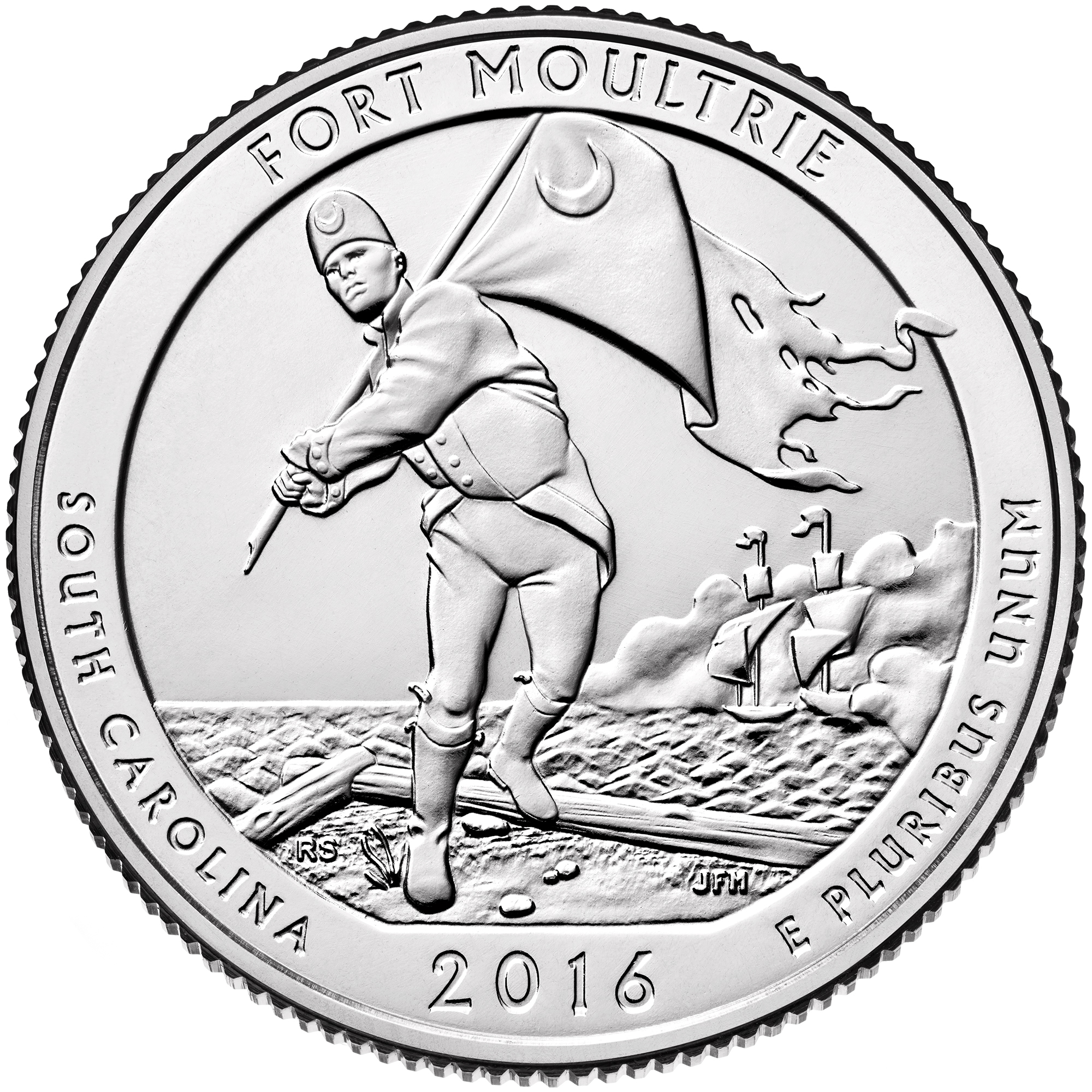
US quarter featuring the Moultrie flag.
