= William Jasper =

American soldier in the Revolutionary War

- Jasper holding the Moultrie Flag at the Battle of Sullivan's Island
- Born: c. 1750
- Died: October 9, 1779 (aged 29); Savannah, Georgia, U.S.
- Military career
- Allegiance: United Colonies; United States
- Branch: Continental Army
- Service years: 1775–1779
- Rank: Sergeant
- Unit: 2nd South Carolina Regiment
- Conflicts: American Revolutionary War; Battle of Sullivan's Island; Siege of Savannah †

William Jasper (c. 1750 – October 9, 1779) was an American soldier in the Revolutionary War. He was a sergeant in the 2nd South Carolina Regiment.

Jasper distinguished himself in the defense of Fort Moultrie (then called Fort Sullivan) on June 28, 1776. When a shell from a British warship shot away the flagstaff, he recovered the South Carolina flag in the Battle of Sullivan's Island, raised it on a temporary staff, and held it under fire until a new staff was installed. Governor John Rutledge gave his sword to Jasper in recognition of his bravery.

In 1779, Sergeant Jasper participated in the Siege of Savannah, led by General Lincoln, which failed to recapture Savannah, Georgia, from the British. He was mortally wounded during an assault on the British forces there.

Sgt. Jasper's story is similar to that of Sgt. John Newton. Five states (Indiana, Missouri, Texas, Mississippi, and Georgia) have adjacent counties named Jasper and Newton, as these were remembered as a pair, due to the popularity of Parson Weems' memorializing early American history. Several other states have a Jasper County with a county seat of Newton, or vice versa.

== Early life ==
The ancestry of William Jasper is disputed. Traditionally, Jasper has been identified of being of Irish descent born in the colonies. There is also another account which says he was a son of a Welsh immigrant. However, according to one account, William Jasper (named Johann Wilhelm Gasper at the time) came to America in 1767 on the ship Minerva. He and other immigrants hailed from Germany and landed in Philadelphia. He was 16 at the time, but he had decided that whatever the new land held, he would accept it with open arms.

He arrived in Philadelphia in the fall and was fed some warm soup and then put in a line to take an oath of allegiance and sign his name. When it was his turn, though, Jasper did not know how to read or write, so he could not even write his name on the list. He had to just put an X down where he should have put his name and next to it the colonist who had signed him in wrote John William Jasper. He then completed a few years of indentured servitude and moved south to find some land of his own.

William Jasper was motivated when he settled down in the South; he had left his girlfriend in Pennsylvania. To pay for her journey to come live with him, he joined the military; by this time, the colonists had already rebelled. Although the pay was not great, he soon became a sergeant, earning enough for Elizabeth to join him in Georgia, where they were soon married.

According to other accounts, William Jasper was the son of John Jasper, a Virginia blacksmith who had migrated to Union County, South Carolina during the early 1770s.

== Fort Sullivan ==
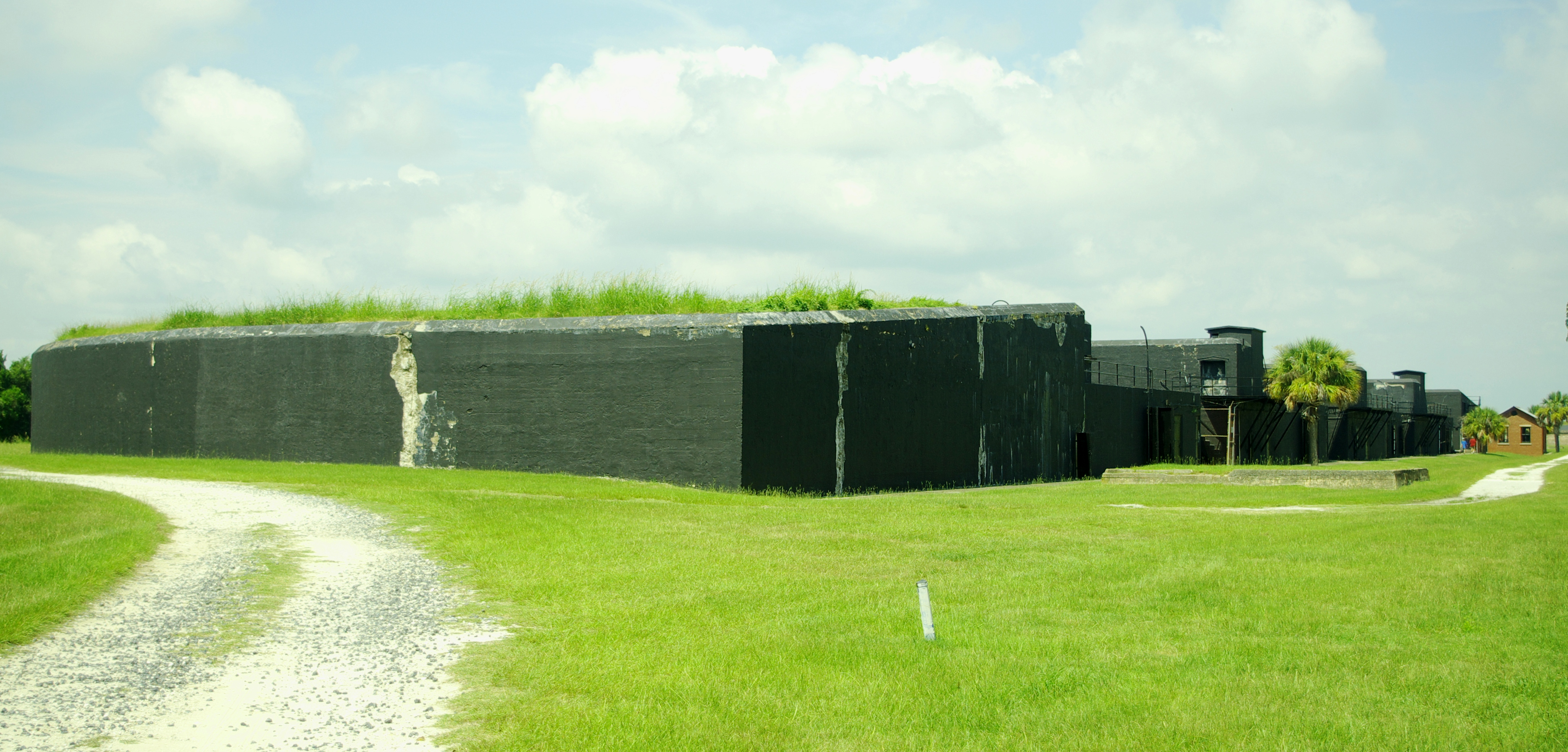
Battery Jasper on Sullivan's Island

Jasper was soon called to Sullivan's Island to help protect Charles Towne (Charleston) Harbor. There, he served under Colonel William Moultrie, who was in charge of the defense of Charleston against the Royal Navy. A few days before the British were due to arrive, Colonel Moultrie decided to build a fort to protect the harbor. His officers were sent to local plantations to borrow their slaves to help with the creation of the fort. Soldiers, slaves, and volunteers banded together to chop down palmettos and use them in its construction.

Initially called Fort Sullivan, some time after the battle the fort was renamed to Fort Moultrie. The British arrived before the fort was finished, its whole back remaining incomplete. The Moultrie flag was raised over the structure, and a 10-hour siege began.

Low on ammunition, the 2nd South Carolina Regiment only fired when ships closed in on the fort. The flag, designed by Moultrie himself at the behest of the colonial government, was shot down, and fell to the bottom of the ditch on the outside of the fort. Leaping from an embrasure, Jasper recovered the flag, which he tied to a sponge staff (see the Cannon instruments section of the Cannon operation article) and replaced on the parapet, where he supported it until a permanent flag staff had been procured and installed. With this rallying point, the colonists held out until sunset, when the British fleet retreated. They did not succeed in taking Charleston until several years later.

Because of Jasper's heroism, Governor John Rutledge presented him with his personal sword, and offered him a lieutenant's commission. He did not accept the offer to become an officer, saying that he would only be an embarrassment since he could neither read nor write. He was also presented with two silk flags by Mrs. Susannah Elliott.

Battery Jasper, an extension of Fort Moultrie, was built in 1897 and named in his honor.

== Roving commission ==
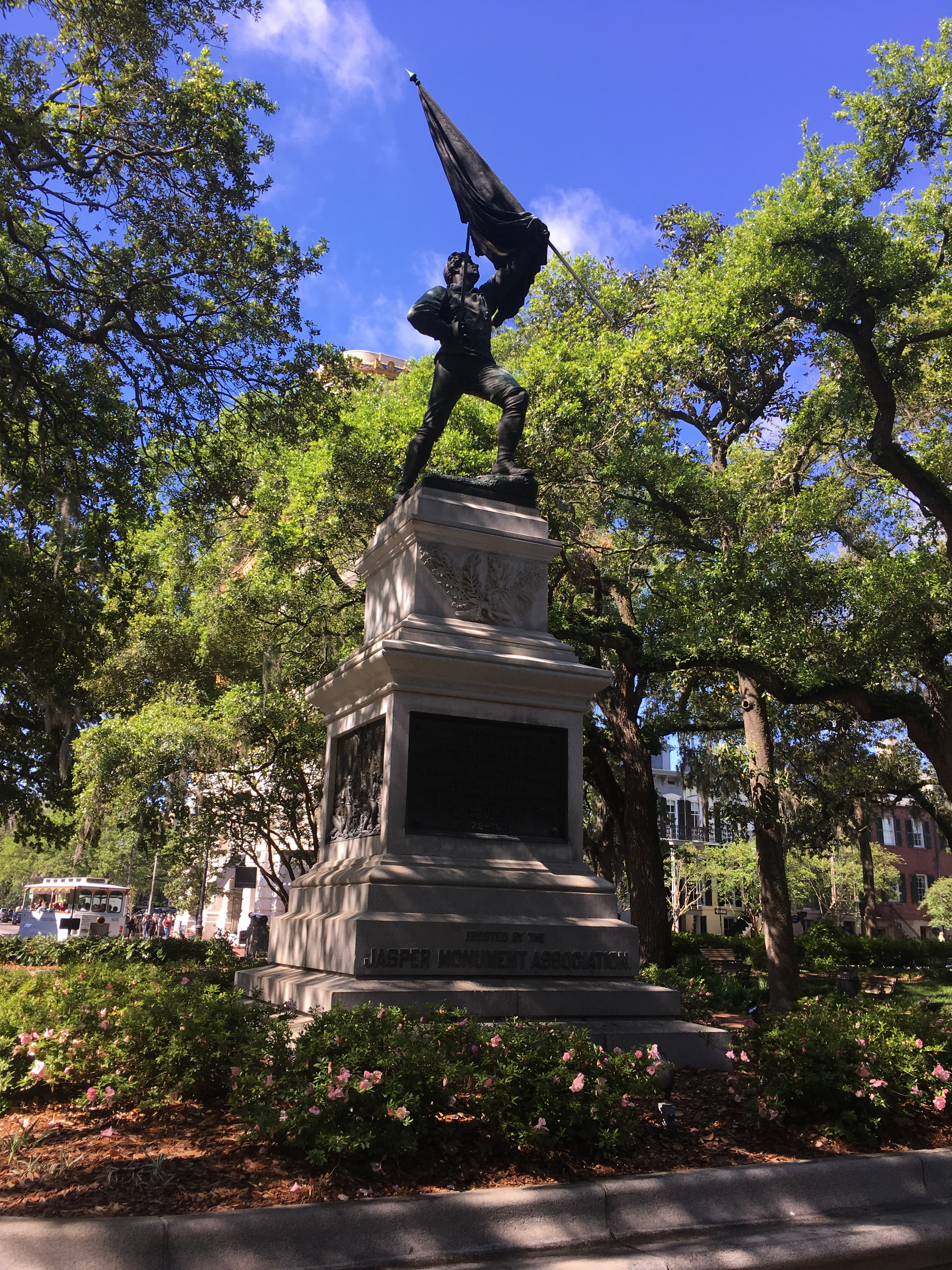
William Jasper Monument at Madison Square in Savannah, Georgia

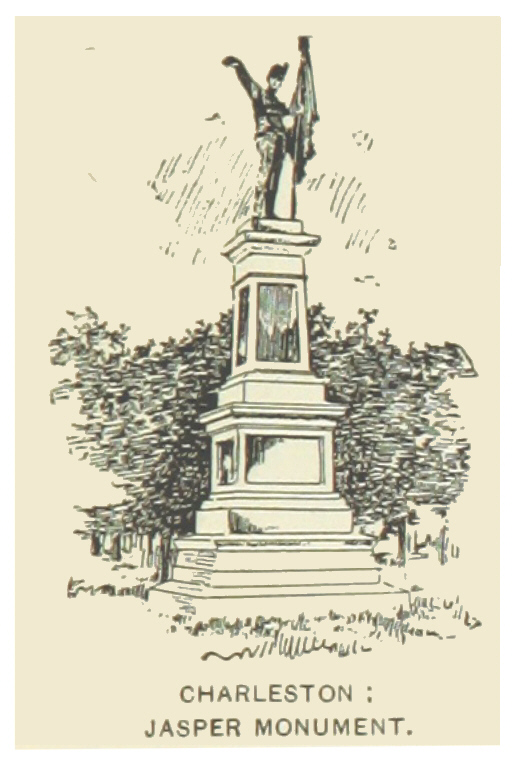
The Defenders of Fort Moultrie monument in Charleston, South Carolina

Colonel Moultrie gave him a roving commission to scour the country with a few men, gather information, and attack British forces and outposts. This commission was later renewed by Francis Marion and Benjamin Lincoln. During this period, Jasper liberated a group of American prisoners of war by overpowering their British guards, an incident which was subsequently exaggerated by the storyteller Parson Weems.

== Savannah ==
Supposedly, at the Siege of Savannah, he received his death wound while fastening to the parapet the standard which had been presented to his regiment. His hold, however, never relaxed, and he bore the colors to a place of safety before he died.

== Places named after Jasper ==
- Jasper County, Georgia
- Jasper County, Illinois
- Jasper County, Indiana
- Jasper County, Iowa
- Jasper County, Mississippi
- Jasper County, Missouri, and its city of Jasper, Missouri
- Jasper County, South Carolina
- Jasper County, Texas, and its city of Jasper, Texas
- City of Jasper, Alabama
- City of Jasper, Arkansas
- City of Jasper, Florida
- City of Jasper, Georgia
- City of Jasper, Minnesota
- Town of Jasper, Tennessee
- Town of Jasper, New York
