= HMS Friendship (1763) =

Cutter of the Royal Navy

History

Great Britain
- Name: HMS Friendship
- Launched: 1760 as merchant vessel
- Acquired: 16 February 1763
- Commissioned: April 1763
- Decommissioned: October 1771
- In service: 1763–1771
- Out of service: October 1771
- Fate: Sold out of service, Plymouth Dockyard

General characteristics
- Class & type: 4-gun cutter
- Tons burthen: 60 47/94 (bm)
- Length: 39 ft 7.5 in (12.1 m) (overall); 28 ft 11 in (8.8 m) (keel)
- Beam: 19 ft 10 in (6.0 m)
- Depth of hold: 7 ft 6 in (2.29 m)
- Sail plan: fore-and-aft rig
- Complement: 24
- Armament: 4 × 3-pounder guns, 6 x 1/2-pounder swivels

HMS Friendship was a 4-gun single-masted cutter of the Royal Navy, purchased in 1763 for coastal patrol duties in the immediate aftermath of the Seven Years' War with France. After eight years of service in Start Bay in Devon, she was declared surplus to Navy requirements and sold out of service at Plymouth.

== Construction ==
Friendship was one of thirty cutters ordered to be purchased by the Royal Navy in three month from December 1762 to February 1763 for coastal duties off English ports. The function of these purchased cutters included convoy and patrol, the carrying of messages between Navy vessels in port and assisting the press gang in the interception of merchant craft. (Note: Merchant seamen were eligible for Navy impressment if they were aboard merchant vessels returning to English ports after trading overseas. To avoid being pressed, seamen would routinely board small coastal craft sent out to their ships before they made port. These small craft would then land the seamen on beaches outside the port proper. During the War of the Austrian Succession and the Seven Years' War, Navy cutters such as Friendship were stationed in major seaports in order to intercept these craft and deliver those on board to the press gang in the port.)

Admiralty Orders for her purchase were issued on 16 February 1763 with the transaction completed for £316. (Note: Although purchased in February, the completed transaction was not reported to Admiralty until 19 April.) She was a small craft, single-masted and with an overall length of 39 ft 7.5 in (12.1 m) including bowsprit, a 28 ft 1 in (8.6 m) keel, a beam of 19 ft 10 in (6.05 m) and measuring 60 47/94 tons burthen. At the time of purchase she had been at sea as a merchant vessel for three years.

On 8 April 1763 the newly purchased cutter was sailed to Woolwich Dockyard for fitting out as a Navy craft. Works ran for two months until 17 June, at a total cost of £501. As rebuilt for Navy service, she was armed with four three-pounder cannons and six 1/2-pounder swivel guns, with a complement of 24 crew.

== Naval service ==
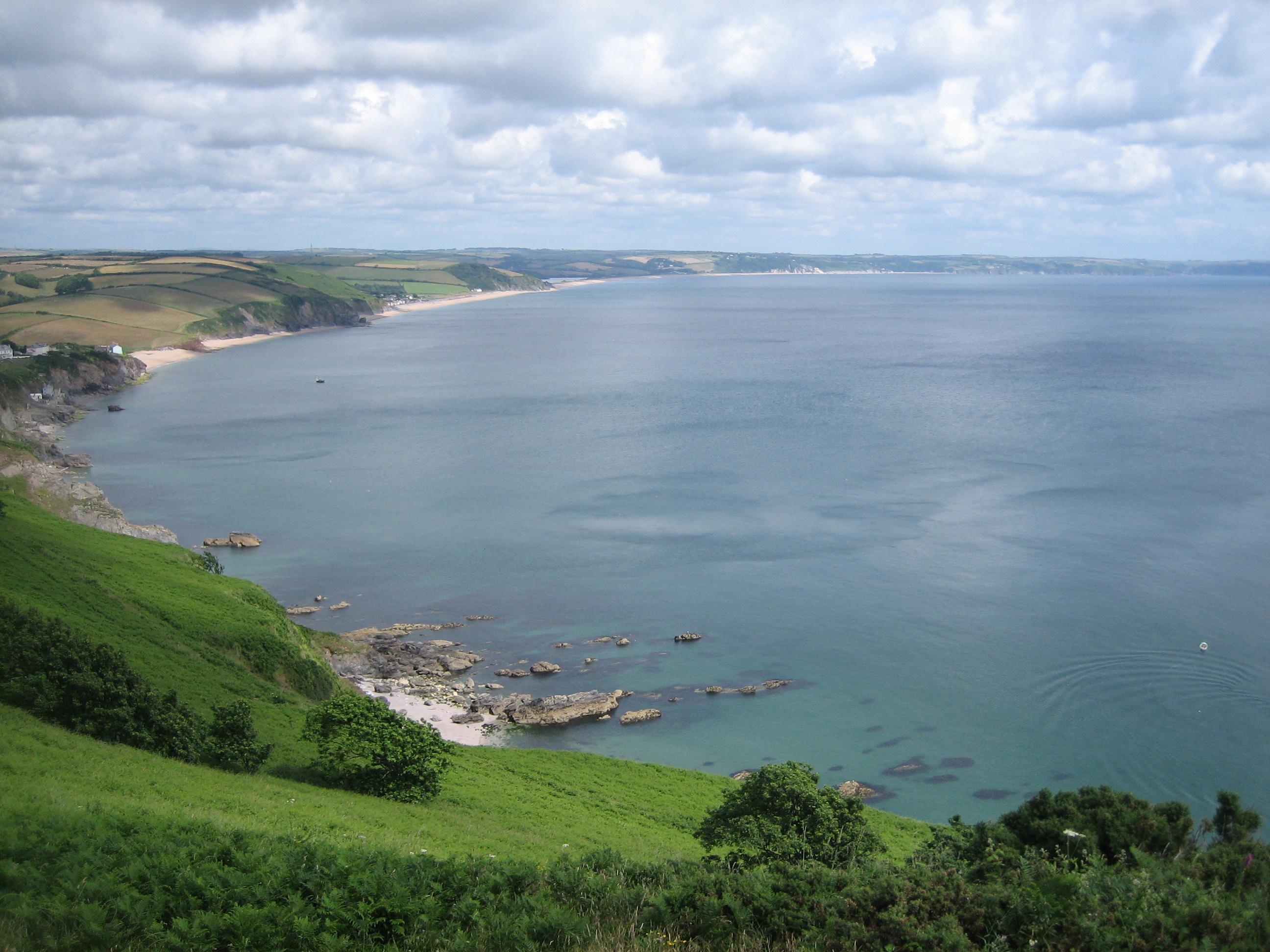
Start Bay in Devon, where Friendship was stationed from 1763 to 1771.

War with France had ended before Friendship was ready for service. Despite this, commissioning went ahead in April 1763 and the vessel entered the Navy as a patrol cutter in Start Bay off Devon. Her first commander was Lieutenant Patrick Strachan, father of future Royal Navy Admiral Sir Richard Strachan. In 1766 command passed to Lieutenant Rowland Pigot, and then in 1768 to Lieutenant John Glover. Friendship remained at the same station throughout these changes of command. In September 1769 she captured a smuggler's vessel carrying two hundred gallons of brandy and a quantity of tea.

Friendship was paid off as surplus to Navy requirements in 1771. On 29 October she was sold out of service at Plymouth Dockyard for a final price of £100.
