= William Moultrie =

American politician (1730–1805)

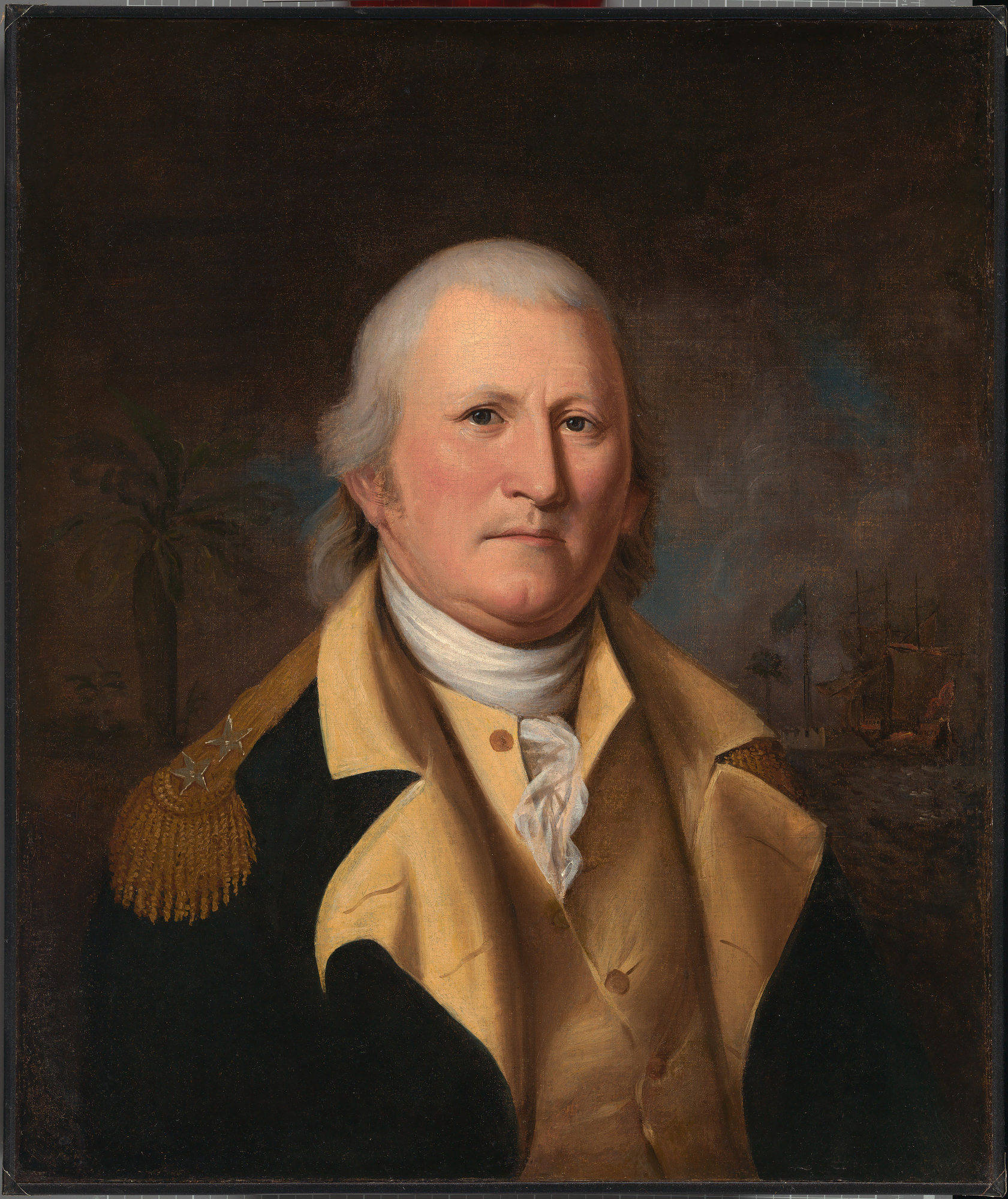
- Portrait by Charles Willson Peale, c. 1782

35th Governor of South Carolina
- In office December 5, 1792 – December 17, 1794
- Lieutenant: James Ladson
- Preceded by: Charles Pinckney
- Succeeded by: Arnoldus Vanderhorst
- In office February 11, 1785 – February 20, 1787
- Lieutenant: Charles Drayton
- Preceded by: Benjamin Guerard
- Succeeded by: Thomas Pinckney

10th Lieutenant Governor of South Carolina
- In office February 16, 1784 – February 11, 1785
- Governor: Benjamin Guerard
- Preceded by: Richard Beresford
- Succeeded by: Charles Drayton

Personal details
- Born: November 23, 1730 Charlestown, Province of South Carolina, British America
- Died: September 27, 1805 (aged 74) Charleston, South Carolina, U.S.
- Resting place: Fort Moultrie

Military service
- Allegiance: Great Britain; United States
- Branch/service: South Carolina militia Continental Army
- Years of service: 1761; 1775–1783
- Rank: Major General
- Unit: 2nd South Carolina Regiment
- Battles/wars: Anglo-Cherokee War; American Revolutionary War; Battle of Sullivan's Island; Battle of Beaufort; Siege of Savannah; Siege of Charleston

William Moultrie (/ˈmuːltriː/; November 23, 1730 – September 27, 1805) was an American planter and politician who became a general in the American Revolutionary War. As colonel leading a state militia, in 1776 he prevented the British from taking Charleston, and Fort Moultrie was named in his honor.

After independence, Moultrie advanced as a politician; he was elected by the legislature twice within a decade as Governor of South Carolina (1785–1787, 1792–1794), serving two terms. (The state constitution kept power in the hands of the legislature and prohibited governors from serving two consecutive terms.)

== Life ==
William Moultrie was born in Charles Town in the Province of South Carolina. His parents were the Scottish physician Dr. John Moultrie and Lucretia Cooper (both from Scotland), and he acquired a slave plantation with 200 African Americans.

Moultrie fought in the Anglo-Cherokee War (1761). Before the advent of the American Revolution, he was elected to the colonial assembly representing St. Helena Parish.

In 1775, Moultrie was commissioned as colonel of the 2nd South Carolina Regiment of provincial troops. In 1776, Moultrie's defense of a small fort on Sullivan's Island (later named Fort Moultrie in his honor) prevented Sir Henry Clinton and Sir Peter Parker from taking Charleston. The Continental Congress passed a resolution thanking Moultrie. He was promoted to brigadier general and his regiment was taken into the Continental Army.

Moultrie successfully led a repulse of the British at Port Royal in February 1779. That spring when Major General Benjamin Lincoln took the bulk of the American force towards Augusta, Georgia, Moultrie was stationed at Black Swamp with a small contingent to watch the British on the other side of the Savannah River. When the British suddenly crossed the Savannah en masse and move towards Charleston, Moultrie executed a tactical retreat across the Coosawhatchie and the Tullifiny Rivers and all the way back to Charleston where he held off a short British siege. He refused to surrender at a time when the civilian authorities in Charleston felt somewhat abandoned by the Continental Congress and were almost ready to give up.

Moultrie was captured when Charleston surrendered to the British in 1780. He was left in command of the American prisoners of war and frequently negotiated on their behalf with British commandant Lieutenant-Colonel Nisbet Balfour. Lord Charles Montagu made an unsuccessful attempt to persuade Moultrie to switch sides during his imprisonment. Moultrie was exchanged for British prisoners in 1782. The same year, he was promoted to major general, the last man appointed by Congress to that rank.

After the war he was elected by the new state legislature as 35th governor of South Carolina (1785–1787). The state constitution prohibited men from serving two successive terms as governor, an effort to keep power in the hands of the legislature. Moultrie was re-elected by the legislature in 1792, serving into 1794. He ran one last time for governor in 1798, but lost decisively to fellow Federalist Edward Rutledge.

William Moultrie was the first president of the Society of the Cincinnati of the State of South Carolina and served in that capacity until his death. He also served as President of the St. Andrew's Society of Charleston from 1787 to 1790.

In 1802 he published his Memoirs of the Revolution as far as it Related to the States of North and South Carolina.

The Moultrie Flag

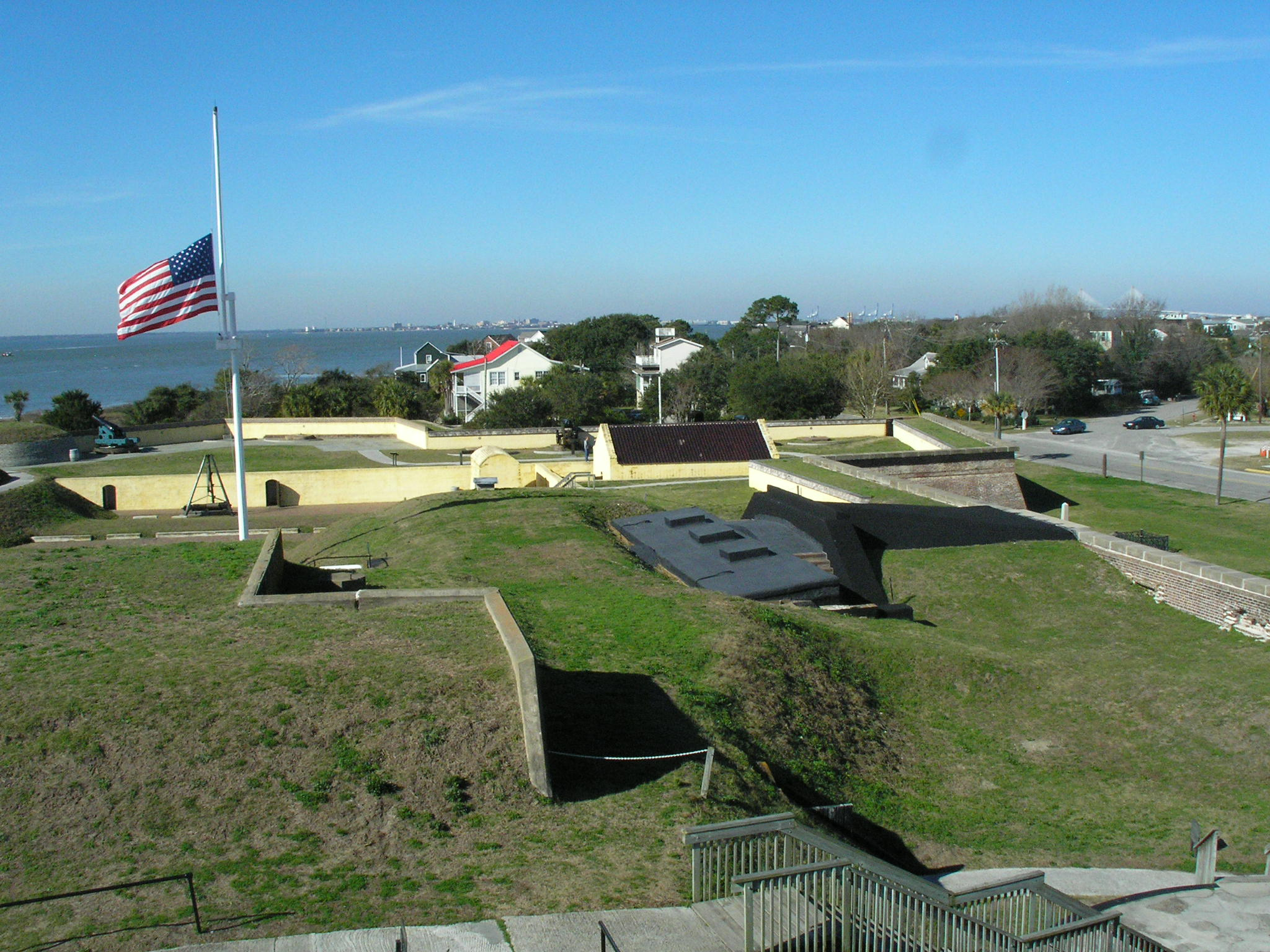
Fort Moultrie, in 2006

== Legacy ==
After the war, the fort he had defended was renamed Fort Moultrie in his honor. It operated as a pivotal defense point until supplanted by Fort Sumter. Fort Moultrie was used as an active post of the United States Army from 1798 until the end of World War Two.

Moultrie County, Illinois is also named in his honor. Ochlockoney, Georgia was renamed in 1859 as Moultrie when it was incorporated by the Georgia General Assembly.

=== Moultrie Flag ===
During his notable defense of the fort in 1776, a flag of Moultrie's own design was flown: a field of blue bearing a white crescent with the word LIBERTY on it. It is not known who made this first flag to Moultrie's specifications. The flag was shot down during the fight. Sergeant William Jasper picked it up, tied it to a makeshift flag-staff (some accounts say a cannon sponge or ramrod) fixed it back above the ramparts to rally the troops, and the story became widely known. The flag became an icon of the Revolution in the South. It was called the Moultrie, or the Liberty Flag. The new state of South Carolina incorporated its design into its state flag. After the battle the wife of Major Barnard Elliott, who had been the commander of the Grenadier company under Moultrie, but was transferred to the SC Artillery regiment before the fight at Sullivan's Island, presented two silk infantry standards, one blue and one red, to Moultrie's regiment. Three years later, on Oct 9, 1779, Sergeant Jasper was mortally wounded while carrying the blue standard at the Spring Hill redoubt during the American and French attack on Savannah. The flag was later pulled from under the body of Lieutenant Bush and sent to England. Jasper made it back and died the next day. His last words were reported as, "I have got my furlough," a bit of dark humor meaning he knew he was going to be out of the fight. The famous quote "Tell Mrs. Elliott I did my best to save her flag," was invented by Parson Weems and published in his 1805 biography of Francis Marion, who was the regimental commander at that time, Moultrie having been promoted to General. The book was originally published as a joint venture between Weems and Peter Horry, who had actually been at Savannah and witnessed Jasper's wounding. This and many other exaggerations and outright fabrications by Weems caused Horry to have his name removed from later editions.

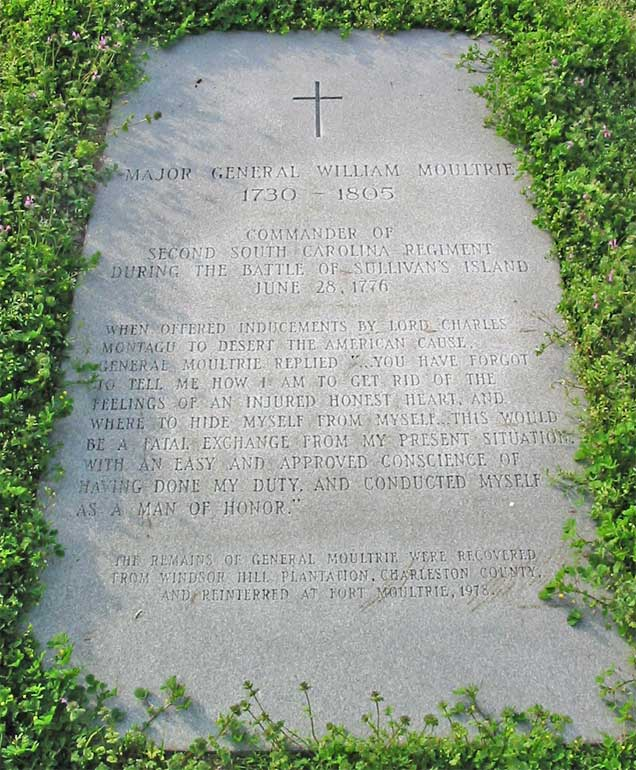
Grave of William Moultrie

Political offices
Preceded by Richard Beresford	Lieutenant Governor of South Carolina; 1784–1785	Succeeded by Charles Drayton
Preceded by Benjamin Guerard	Governor of South Carolina; 1785–1787	Succeeded by Thomas Pinckney
Preceded by Charles Pinckney	Governor of South Carolina; 1792–1794	Succeeded by Arnoldus Vanderhorst
