= Brother against brother =

American Civil War phrase

"Brother against brother" is a phrase used in histories of the American Civil War, describing the predicament faced in families (primarily, but not exclusively, residents of border states) in which their loyalties and military service were divided between the Union and the Confederacy. There are a number of stories of brothers fighting in the same battles on opposite sides, or even of brothers killing brothers over the issues.

== Examples ==
- December 26, 1861, Confederate Lt. Col. Nathan Bedford Forrest was ordered to probe the strength of Union troops in and around Camp Calhoun, Kentucky. Two Confederate forward scouts, Adam R. Johnson and Robert M. Martin, each had brothers stationed at the camp.
- On May 23, 1862, at the Battle of Front Royal, Capt. William Goldsborough of the Confederate 1st Maryland Infantry captured his brother Charles Goldsborough of the Union 1st Maryland Infantry and took him prisoner.
- The Crittenden brothers were brigadier generals on opposite sides of the conflict: George Bibb Crittenden within the Confederate Army and Thomas Leonidas Crittenden within the Union Army. In 1861, George was promoted to brigadier general on August 15 and briefly commanded a brigade in the Army of the Potamac before he was assigned the District of East Tennessee in November. George briefly commanded the 2nd Division of the Army of Central Kentucky, but was relieved of duty and arrested for drunkenness on March 31, 1862.
- The Terrill brothers were also brigadier generals on opposite sides of the conflict: James Barbour Terrill within the Confederate Army (killed at the Battle of Totopotomoy Creek) and William Rufus Terrill within the Union Army (killed at the Battle of Perryville).
- On November 7, 1861, at the Battle of Port Royal, Union Navy Commander Percival Drayton of the USS Pocahontas battled Confederate forces on shore commanded by his brother General Thomas F. Drayton.
- As cited in the book, "A Century of Wayne County, Kentucky", brothers Anthony and William McBeath fought on opposite sides of the Civil War, Anthony for the Confederate Army, and William for the Union Army. At the end of the war, both brothers returned home the same evening, William in a "resplendent uniform of a Major in the Federal Army", and several hours later, Anthony in "rags with a 'taterhill' hat."

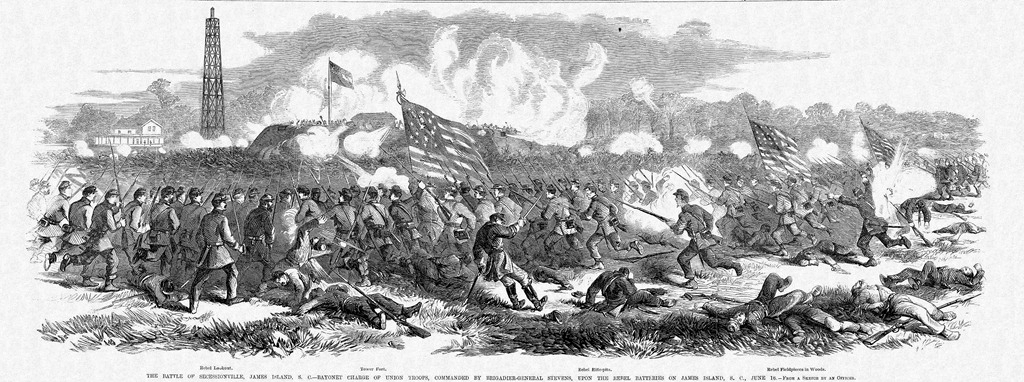
Battle of Secessionville.

- On June 16, 1862, Brothers James and Alexander Sandy Campbell fought each other on opposite sides of the Battle of Secessionville, which was the first major attempt by federal troops to regain Charleston. James and Alexander Campbell were brothers from a Scottish family that immigrated to the United States in the 1850s. Confederate James Campbell joined a militia company in Charleston known as the 42nd Infantry Regiment, which consolidated with other troops into the Charleston Battalion. In New York, Alexander joined the 79th Highlander regiment. They were within yards of each other, but were unaware of that fact until near the end of the battle. James wrote to Sandy after the battle, "I was astonished to hear from the prisoners that you was colour Bearer of the Regmt that assalted the Battrey [sic] at this point the other day."
- In May 1863, brothers John and Henry McLaughlin fought on opposite sides at the Siege of Vicksburg. Both McLaughlin brothers were born in Marion County, Indiana. John McLaughlin enlisted with the Union army, achieving the rank of colonel by the end of the war. Henry enlisted in the Confederate Army as a private and was promoted to second lieutenant. In the battle the Siege of Vicksburg, Henry was captured and sent to a Union military prison.
- The Terrill Brothers came into conflict at the Confederate victory at Hartsville, TN in 1862. George W. Terrill, Joshua C. Terril, Simeon F. Terrill, and Robert Q. Terrill originated in Boone County, KY. George W. Terrill fought with the 5th KY Cavalry, Company G, along with his brothers Joshua and Simeon. Robert Q. Terrill was a first lieutenant in the Kentucky Volunteer U.S. Infantry, 11th Regiment. At the Confederate victory at Hartsville, TN in 1862, the 5th KY Cavalry took 1,844 Union prisoners and wagons of supplies. One of these prisoners was Robert Terrill.
- The historian and genealogical researcher Chad Clifford Davis of Tulsa, Oklahoma uncovered the first known set of brothers to fight against each other in the Battle of Elkhorn Tavern on March 7, 1862. Private John Virgil Barnhart from Company B of the 24th Missouri Infantry Regiment (USA) fought his brother Private Thomas Henderson Barnhart of the Missouri State Guard 3rd Brigade (CSA). Their brother Alfred S. Barnhart also served Confederate Missouri as a Partisan Ranger, and their brothers David and Henry fought as Unionists.
