= General Terrell =

General Terrell may refer to:

- Alexander W. Terrell (1827–1912), Confederate States Army brigadier general (assignment not confirmed)
- Henry Terrell Jr. (1890–1971), U.S. Army major general
- James B. Terrill (1838–1864), Confederate States Army brigadier general
- William R. Terrill (1834–1862), Union Army brigadier general

== See also ==
- Attorney General Terrell (disambiguation)
