= USS Drayton =

Two ships in the United States Navy have been named USS Drayton for Percival Drayton.

- USS Drayton (DD-23) was a Paulding-class destroyer launched in 1910 and decommissioned in 1919 after service in World War I
- USS Drayton (DD-366) was a Mahan-class destroyer launched in 1936 and decommissioned by 1945 after service in World War II
