= Senator Drayton =

Senator Drayton may refer to:

- John Drayton (1766–1822), South Carolina State Senate
- Thomas Drayton (1809–1891), South Carolina State Senate
