= Confederate Heartland Offensive =

Confederate military campaign during the American Civil War

Confederate Heartland Offensive Kentucky Campaign
- Part of the Western Theater of the American Civil War
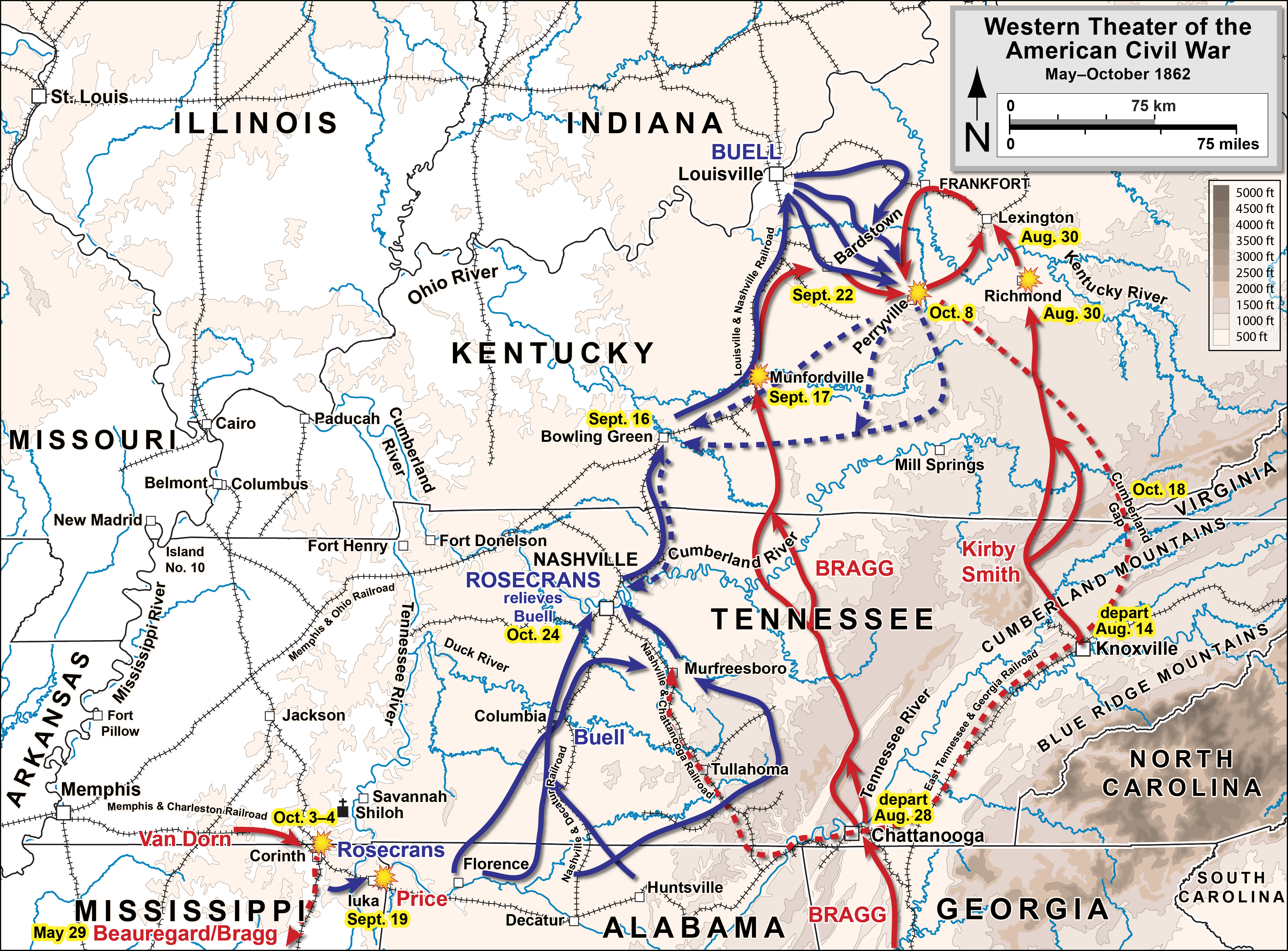
- Map of Western Theater of the American Civil War, from Corinth, Mississippi, to Perryville, Kentucky
- Operational scope: Strategic offensive
- Location: Tennessee and Kentucky; 37.5°N 85°W
- Commanded by: (Confederate States of America) Gen. Braxton Bragg
- Date: August 14 – October 10, 1862
- Executed by: Army of Mississippi
- Outcome: Union victory
- Location of Kentucky within the United States

The Confederate Heartland Offensive (August 14 – October 10, 1862), also known as the Kentucky Campaign, was an American Civil War campaign conducted by the Confederate States Army in Tennessee and Kentucky where Generals Braxton Bragg and Edmund Kirby Smith tried to draw neutral Kentucky into the Confederacy by outflanking Union troops under Major General Don Carlos Buell. Though they scored some successes, notably a tactical win at Perryville, they soon retreated, leaving Kentucky primarily under Union control for the rest of the war.

== Background ==
=== Military situation ===
Western campaigns by Union forces earlier in 1862 had reaped much progress largely driving Confederates from Kentucky and large parts of Tennessee. The Tennessee and Cumberland Rivers had been opened to the U.S. Navy after successes at the battles of Fort Henry and Fort Donelson. The railroad hub at Corinth had been evacuated by the Confederates, causing most of West Tennessee to fall into Union control. New Orleans, the Confederacy's largest city at that time, had been captured by Admiral David Farragut. The city of Vicksburg, Mississippi, was now an important strategic aim for the Union commanders, as the western Confederates were "narrowed down all to the single line of [rail]road running east from Vicksburg." Consequentially, protecting the Confederate stronghold on the Mississippi River became a top priority for the Confederacy. Confederate General Braxton Bragg decided to divert Union attention away from Vicksburg and from Chattanooga, Tennessee, which was being threatened by a large Union force under Don Carlos Buell, by invading the border state of Kentucky in the Upper South. Kentucky, the most southern of the southern border states, produced cotton (in west Kentucky) and tobacco on large scale plantations similar to Virginia and North Carolina in the central and western portions of the state with slave labor, and was the primary supplier of hemp for rope used in the cotton industry. The state was also a major slave trade center especially out of Louisville.

Kentucky, being a border southern state, was among the chief places where the "brother against brother" scenario was prevalent. Southern sympathizers and delegates from 68 counties in Kentucky had already seceded and joined the Confederacy, and controlled more than half the state early in the war, but had been unable to enforce their rule over the state's territory after early 1862. Kentucky officially declared its neutrality at the beginning of the war, but after Confederate General Leonidas Polk unwisely decided to occupy Columbus in 1861, the legislature petitioned the Union Army for assistance against the Kentucky governor's veto. After early 1862 Kentucky came largely under Union control, though Kentucky also had a star on the Confederate flag, and seats in the Confederate Congress. In addition, many Confederate leaders, including John C. Breckinridge, were from Kentucky. (Note: Jefferson Davis was born in Kentucky and grew up in Mississippi.) Abraham Lincoln was also born in Kentucky, living there until age seven and growing up in Illinois. Most of Mary Todd Lincoln's relatives from the Lexington, Kentucky area were Confederate officers, and about 35,000 Kentuckians served as Confederate soldiers. An estimated 125,000 Kentuckians served as Union soldiers. Nearly sixty infantry regiments served in the Union armies, versus just nine in the Confederate. However, a rather large number of cavalry outfits joined the latter.

== Campaign ==
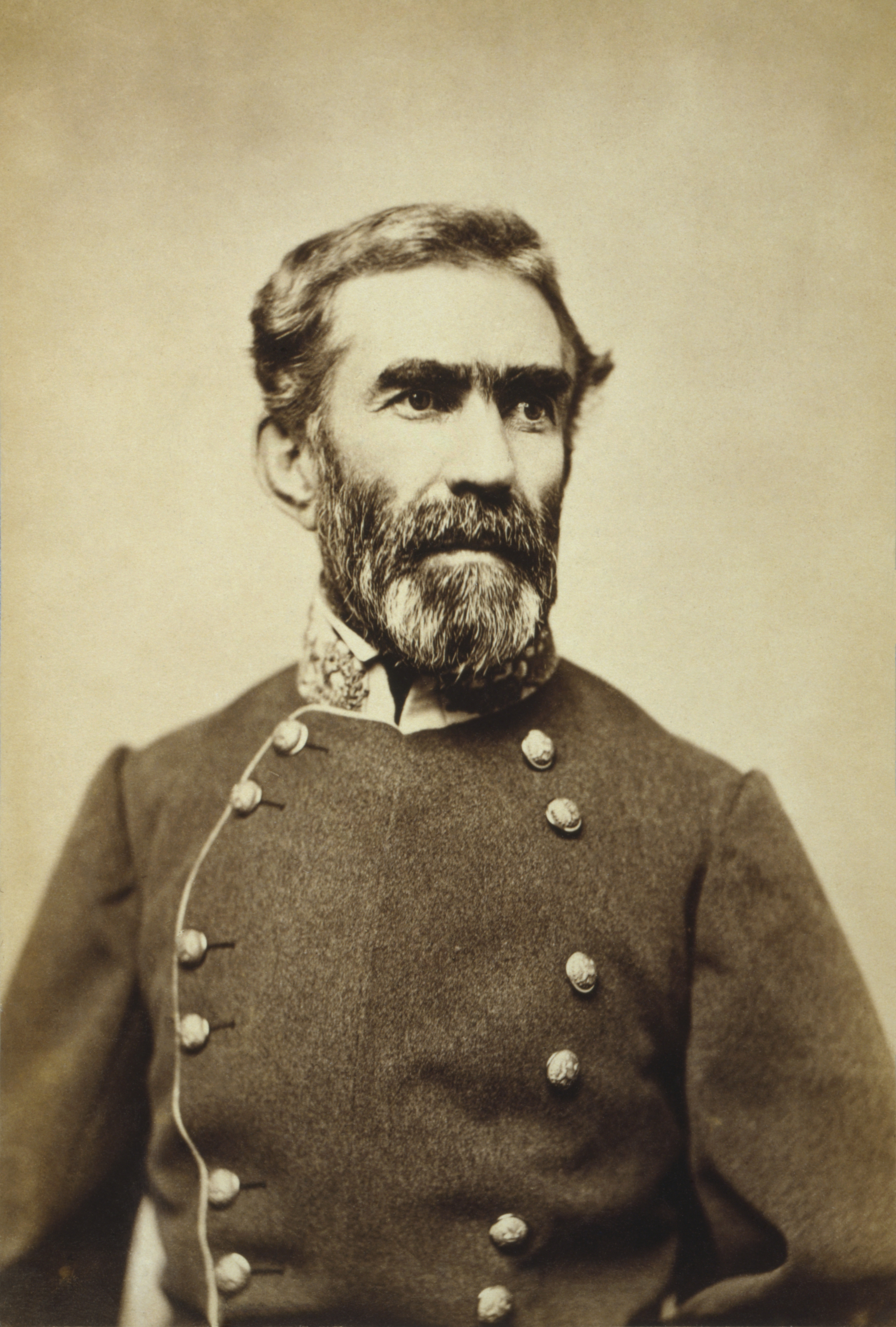
Gen. Braxton Bragg, commanding general of the Army of Mississippi

In August, Confederate General Braxton Bragg invaded Kentucky, hoping that he could arouse supporters of the Confederate cause in the border state and draw Union forces under Maj. Gen. Don Carlos Buell back beyond the Ohio River. Bragg transported all of his infantry by railroads from Tupelo, Mississippi, to Chattanooga, Tennessee, while his cavalry and artillery moved by road. By moving his army to Chattanooga, he was able to challenge Buell's advance on the city.

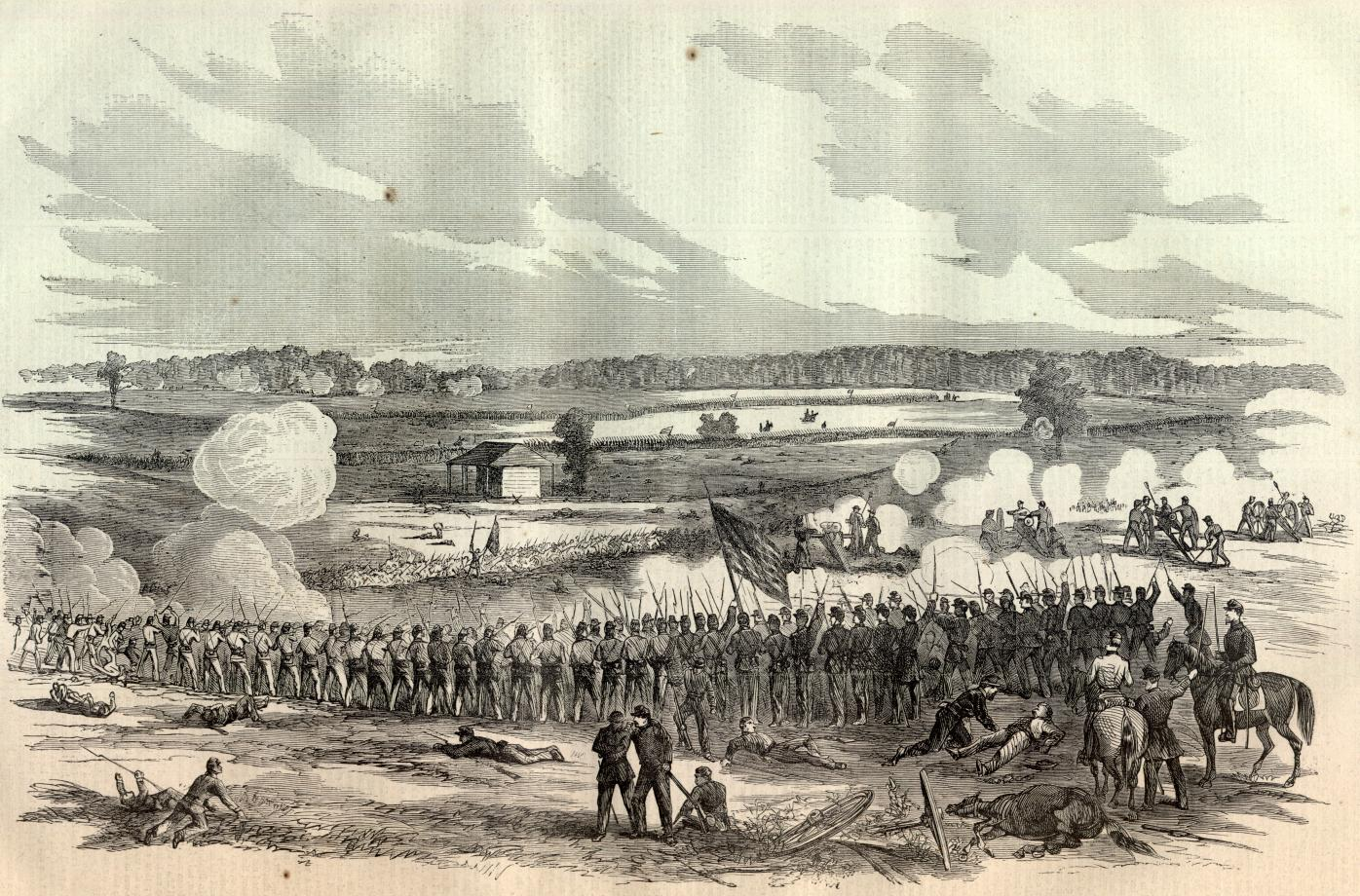
The Battle of Perryville as depicted in Harper's Weekly

Once his forces had assembled in Chattanooga, Bragg then planned to move north into Kentucky in cooperation with Lt. Gen. Edmund Kirby Smith, who was commanding a separate force operating out of Knoxville, Tennessee. He captured over 4,000 Union soldiers at Munfordville, and then moved his army to Bardstown. On October 4, he participated in the inauguration of Richard Hawes as the provisional Confederate governor of Kentucky. The wing of Bragg's army under Maj. Gen. Leonidas Polk met Buell's army at Perryville on October 8 and won a tactical victory against him.

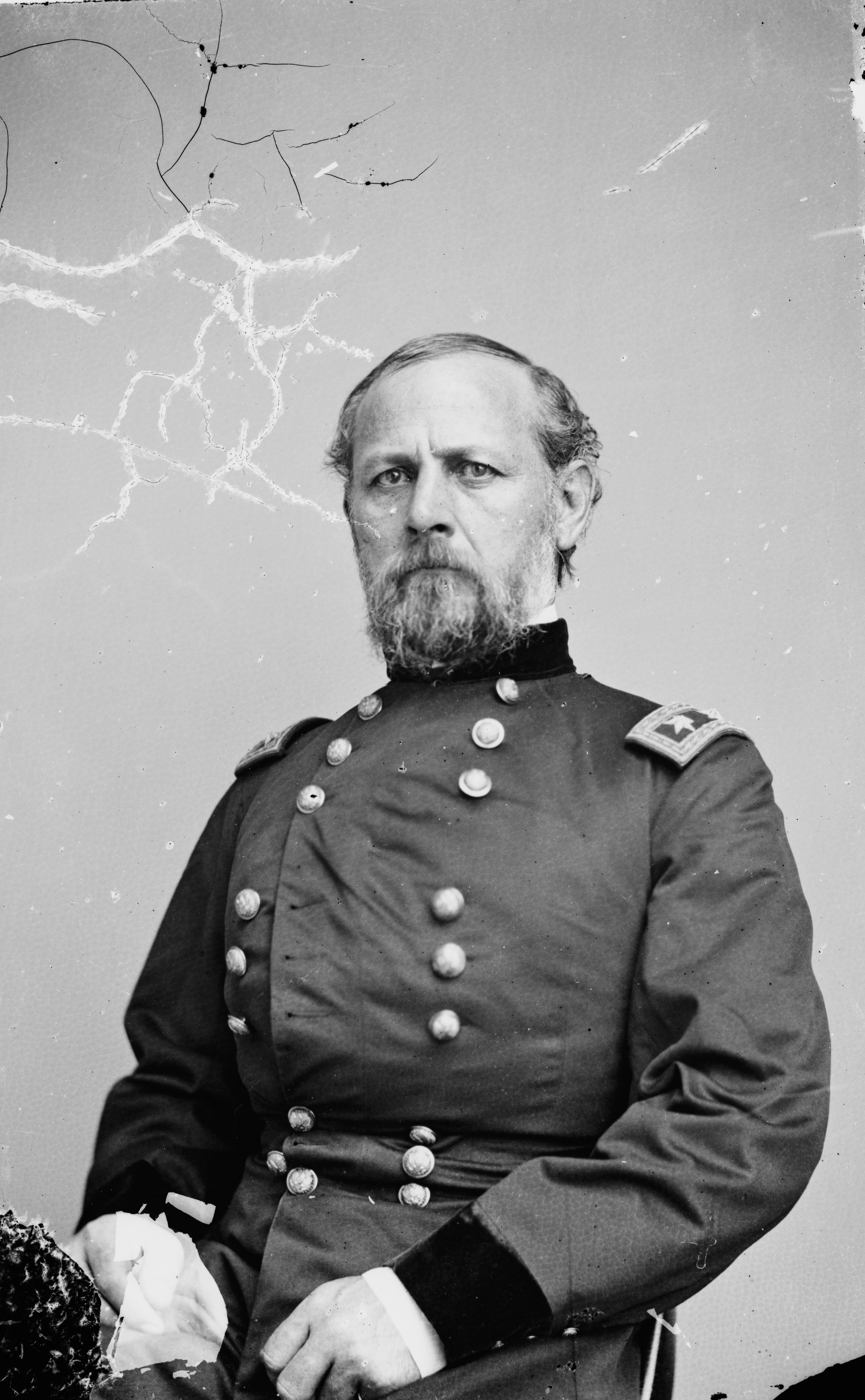
Maj. Gen. Don Carlos Buell, commanding general of the Union's Army of the Ohio

Kirby Smith pleaded with Bragg to follow up on his success: "For God's sake, General, let us fight Buell here." Bragg replied, "I will do it, sir," but then displaying what one observer called "a perplexity and vacillation which had now become simply appalling to Smith, to Hardee, and to Polk," he ordered his army to retreat through the Cumberland Gap to Knoxville. Bragg referred to his retreat as a withdrawal, the successful culmination of a giant raid. He had multiple reasons for withdrawing. Disheartening news had arrived from North Mississippi that Earl Van Dorn and Sterling Price had failed at Corinth, just as Robert E. Lee had failed in his Maryland Campaign. He saw that his army had not much to gain from a further, isolated victory, whereas a defeat might cost not only the bountiful food and supplies yet collected, but also his army.

== Aftermath ==
The invasion of Kentucky was a strategic failure, although it had forced the Union forces out of Northern Alabama and most of Middle Tennessee, and it would take the Union forces a year to regain the lost ground. A writer for the Cincinnati Commercial wrote "It was intended by Jeff Davis as a demonstration to keep the men of the West from being employed beyond the Alleghenies to aid McClellan, while the best of the Southern troops invaded Maryland and flanked Washington." Thousands of Union troops at Louisville, Cincinnati, Cumberland Gap and elsewhere "have been held at bay by no more than 40,000 rebels scattered throughout Kentucky."

Confederate General Joseph Wheeler claimed it was a success, stating "We recovered Cumberland Gap and redeemed Middle Tennessee and North Alabama. Two months of marches and battles by the armies of Bragg and Kirby-Smith had cost the Federals a loss in killed, wounded and prisoners of 26,530. We had captured 35 cannons, 16,000 stand of arms, millions of rounds of ammunition, 1,700 mules, 300 wagons loaded with military stores, and 2,000 horses." Confederate war clerk J.B. Jones recorded that Bragg "succeeded in getting away with the largest amount of provisions, clothing, etc., ever obtained by an army, including 8,000 beef cattle, 50,000 barrels of pork, and a million yards of Kentucky cloth."

Bragg was openly criticized by some newspapers, and privately by two of his own generals, Polk and William J. Hardee, but there was plenty of blame to spread among the Confederate high command for the failure of the invasion of Kentucky. The armies of Bragg and Kirby Smith suffered from a lack of unified command. Bragg can be faulted for moving his army away from Munfordville, out of Buell's path, a prime location for a battle to Confederate advantage. Polk can also be blamed for not following Bragg's instructions on the day before and day of the battle of Perryville. Confederate President Jefferson Davis kept Bragg in command of the Army of Tennessee.

Bragg himself blamed the failure in large part on the Kentuckians themselves, whom he had expected to flock to his banner in droves as he marched through the state. He had even brought along 20,000 additional rifles to arm new recruits. In a letter to his wife, he said, "Our only hope was in Kentucky. We were assured she would be with us to a man, yet in seven weeks occupation, with twenty thousand guns and ammunition burdening our train, we only succeeded in getting about two thousand men to join us and at least half of them have now deserted."

Although Buell succeeded in driving Bragg out of Kentucky, his failure to achieve a decisive victory in battle or effectively pursue the Confederate army during its retreat ended his military career. President Lincoln removed Buell from command of the Army of the Ohio for being too cautious in pursuit of Bragg, replacing him with Major General William Rosecrans, and he was investigated by a military commission. Though he was acquitted of any misconduct, he did not receive another command before mustering out of service in May 1864.
