= Brother vs. Brother =

Brother vs. Brother may refer to:

- Twin Dragons, a 1992 Hong Kong action comedy film
- Brother Vs. Brother (TV series), a Canadian reality television series starring twins Jonathan and Drew Scott, known as Property Brothers

== See also ==
- Brother against brother
