= Attorney General Terrell =

Attorney General Terrell may refer to:

- Joseph M. Terrell (1861–1912), Attorney General of Georgia
- George Whitfield Terrell (1803–1846), Attorney General of the Republic of Texas
