= William R. Terrill =

U.S. Army general (1834–1862)

William Rufus Terrill
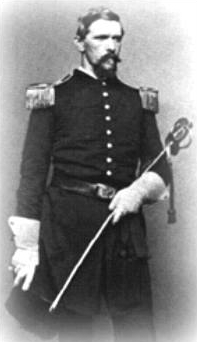
- Born: April 21, 1834; Covington, Virginia, U.S.
- Died: October 8, 1862 (aged 28); Boyle County, Kentucky, U.S.
- Burial place: West Point Cemetery
- Military career
- Allegiance: United States of America; Union
- Branch: United States Army; Union Army
- Service years: 1853–1862
- Rank: Brigadier General
- Conflicts: Third Seminole War; Bleeding Kansas; American Civil War; Battle of Shiloh; Battle of Perryville †

William Rufus Terrill (April 21, 1834 – October 8, 1862) was a United States Army soldier and general who was killed in action at the Battle of Perryville during the American Civil War. His Confederate brother James was also killed during the same war, making the Terrills one of the few sets of American brothers killed in action while commanding brigades.

== Early life ==
Terrill was born in Covington, Virginia, and grew up at Warm Springs, in Bath County, Virginia. His father, Colonel William Henry Terrill, was a Virginia lawyer and member of the Virginia Legislature prior to the war. He became a cadet at U.S. Military Academy in 1849 and graduated in 1853. While a cadet, he was involved in a fist-fight with classmate Philip H. Sheridan. The encounter caused a one-year suspension for Sheridan from the academy, though the two renewed their acquaintance while serving under Don Carlos Buell in the Civil War. Terrill graduated 16th in his class of 1853. After graduation, he was assigned to the 3rd U.S. Artillery and 4th U. S. Artillery, serving in various garrisons. He returned to West Point as an assistant professor of mathematics during 1853–54; served in Florida during the 3rd Seminole War; and the U. S. Coast Survey from 1858 - 1861. In 1856 he was promoted to first lieutenant. On May 14, 1861, he was appointed captain of the 5th Regular Artillery in Washington, D.C.

== Civil War ==
Even though many regular army officers from the South had been opposed to secession, the Confederate attack on Fort Sumter and Lincoln's subsequent call for volunteers caused many southern-born officers to resign their commissions. Terrill, however, left no doubt about where his loyalties lay, telegraphing the War Department and General Winfield Scott from Poughkeepsie, New York, on April 29, 1861, that "I am now and ever will be true to my oath and my country. No one has any authority to tender my resignation. I will be in Washington as soon as possible." Terrill was commissioned a captain in the 5th Regiment of Artillery in August 1861. He was one of sixteen Virginia-born officers in the regular army to tender his services to the Union. His younger brother James B. Terrill was commissioned a major of Virginia Infantry and served in the Confederate States Army. Their father served the Confederate States as the provost marshal of Bath County, Virginia. The elder Terrill wrote his son a scathing letter of disapproval saying "Can you be so recreant and unnatural as to aid in the mad attempt to impose tyranny upon your kith and kin? Do so and your name shall be stricken from the family records."

William Terrill served as assistant inspector general in Washington, D.C., and then commanded a battery of artillery in the Army of the Ohio at the Battle of Shiloh. On September 9, 1862, he was promoted to brigadier general of volunteers and took command of the 33rd Brigade in the Army of the Ohio. Terrill was not popular with all of the men in his brigade due to his Virginia background and for being a strict disciplinarian. One soldier of the 105th Ohio wrote "He is a drunken old tyrant and deserves to be shot by his own men, and if it doesn't come to that, it will be because the oaths of hundreds of men in the 105th were good for nothing." However, fellow officers thought highly of Terrill.

He led his green troops into their first combat action at the Battle of Perryville. Around 4:00 PM, a Confederate artillery shell exploded near Terrill, driving a piece of shrapnel into his upper chest and ripping through his left lung. Taken to the rear, he died that night. The previous night, Generals Terrill and James S. Jackson and Colonel George Webster were discussing the improbability of being killed in action. All three would be killed in the following battle.

In 1864, during the Overland Campaign, Terrill's brother James, by then commanding a brigade, was killed in action at the Battle of Bethesda Church and buried on the battlefield. He was posthumously promoted to brigadier general. Another younger brother, Philip Mallory Terrill of the 12th Virginia Cavalry, was killed near Winchester, Virginia, in November 1864. The fourth brother, Dr. George P. Terrill, a Confederate militia commander, survived the Civil War. An unscrupulous war correspondent from Harper's Weekly manufactured a fitting legend that their grieving father later erected a memorial stone for both brothers, which reads "This monument erected by their father. God alone knows which was right."

William R. Terrill was interred at West Point National Cemetery.

== See also ==
- List of American Civil War generals (Union)
