= USS Drayton (DD-23) =

Paulding-class destroyer

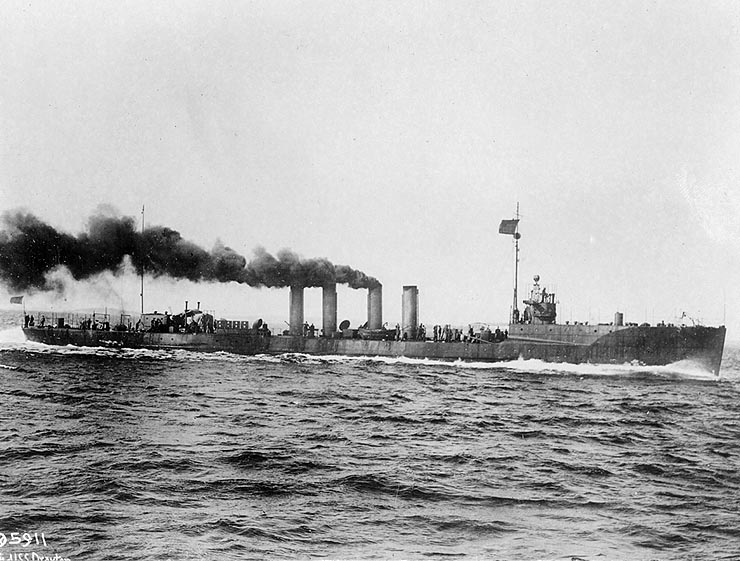
- USS Drayton (DD-23) running builder's trials in 1910, prior to installation of her armament.

History

United States
- Name: Drayton
- Namesake: Captain Percival Drayton
- Builder: Bath Iron Works, Bath, Maine
- Laid down: 19 August 1909
- Launched: 22 August 1910
- Sponsored by: Miss E. G. Drayton, niece of Captain Drayton
- Commissioned: 29 October 1910
- Decommissioned: 17 November 1919
- Stricken: 8 March 1935
- Identification: Hull symbol:DD-23; Code letters:NET
- Fate: Sold 28 June 1935 for scrap

General characteristics
- Class & type: Paulding-class destroyer
- Displacement: 742 long tons (754 t) normal; 887 long tons (901 t) full load
- Length: 293 ft 10 in (89.56 m)
- Beam: 27 ft (8.2 m)
- Draft: 8 ft 4 in (2.54 m) (mean)
- Installed power: 12,000 ihp (8,900 kW)
- Propulsion: 4 × boilers; 3 × Parsons Direct Drive Turbines; 3 × shafts
- Speed: 29.5 kn (33.9 mph; 54.6 km/h); 30.83 kn (35.48 mph; 57.10 km/h) (Speed on Trial)
- Complement: 4 officers 97 enlisted
- Armament: 5 × 3 in (76 mm)/50 caliber guns; 6 × 18 inch (450 mm) torpedo tubes (3 × 2)

USS Drayton (DD-23) was a Paulding-class destroyer in the United States Navy. She was the first ship named for Captain Percival Drayton.

Drayton was launched on 22 August 1910 by Bath Iron Works, Bath, Maine, sponsored by Miss E. G. Drayton, niece of Captain Drayton, and commissioned on 29 October 1910.

== Service history ==
=== Pre-World War I ===
Drayton arrived at Key West, Florida on 21 December 1910, to cruise in Cuban waters and on the east coast in exercises and development problems. She sailed from Key West on 9 April 1914 to serve on blockade duty off Mexico and take refugees out of the troubled areas, returning to New York on 1 June, and to Newport on 1 August.

=== World War I ===
Drayton served on neutrality patrol and conducted torpedo and gunnery exercises out of Newport, Rhode Island and in the Caribbean. Calling at Jacksonville, Florida from 5–11 April 1917, she took over the German steamer Frieda Leonhardt and interned her crew in accordance with a Presidential proclamation issued upon American entry into World War I. Drayton arrived at Norfolk, Virginia on 12 April, and the next day reported for duty with the Patrol Force off the east coast serving until 4 May, when she entered Boston Navy Yard to fit out for distant service.

Drayton departed Boston, Massachusetts on 21 May, and sailed by way of St. John's, Newfoundland to Queenstown, Ireland, arriving on 1 June. She patrolled along the coast of Ireland, escorting both inbound and outbound ships. On 20 June, she searched for the submarine which had torpedoed Bengore Head, then rescued 42 survivors who were landed at Bantry Ireland. From 26 June-4 July, she escorted a transport convoy to St. Nazaire and took part in a submarine hunt with two French cruisers. On 15 December, with Benham, she picked up the survivors of Foylemore, 39 in all.

Transferred to Brest and United States Naval Forces Operating in European Waters, Drayton left Queenstown on 15 February 1918. She continued her escort and antisubmarine operations out of this port until 16 December, when she sailed for the United States, arriving at Boston on 2 January 1919 for overhaul. Drayton cruised along the east coast on various exercises and maneuvers until 18 July, when she reported to Philadelphia Navy Yard in company with seven other destroyers destined for decommissioning.

Drayton was decommissioned on 17 November. On 1 July 1933, her name was dropped and she was known as DD-23 until sold on 28 June 1935.
