= USS Pocahontas (1852) =

Gunboat of the United States Navy

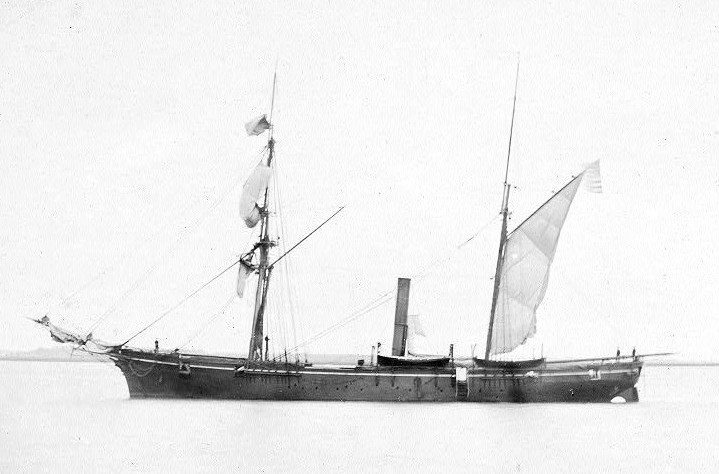
- USS Pocahontas

History

U.S.
- Name: USS Despatch (1856-1860); USS Pocahontas (1860-1865)
- Laid down: 1852
- Acquired: by purchase, 20 March 1855
- Commissioned: 17 January 1856, as Despatch
- Decommissioned: 2 January 1859
- Renamed: Pocahontas, 27 January 1860
- Recommissioned: 19 March 1860
- Decommissioned: 31 July 1865
- Fate: Sold, 30 November 1865

General characteristics
- Type: Steamer
- Displacement: 558 long tons (567 t)
- Length: 169 ft 6 in (51.66 m)
- Beam: 26 ft 3 in (8.00 m)
- Depth of hold: 18 ft 6 in (5.64 m)
- Propulsion: Steam engine and sails
- Armament: 4 × 32-pounder guns, 1 × 10-pounder gun, 1 × 20-pounder Parrott rifle

The first USS Pocahontas, a screw steamer built at Medford, Massachusetts in 1852 as City of Boston, and purchased by the Navy at Boston, Massachusetts on 20 March 1855, was the first United States Navy ship to be named for Pocahontas, the Algonquian wife of Virginia colonist John Rolfe. She was originally commissioned as USS Despatch – the second U.S. Navy ship of that name – on 17 January 1856, with Lieutenant T. M. Crossan in command, and was recommissioned and renamed in 1860, seeing action in the American Civil War. As Pocahontas, one of her junior officers was Alfred Thayer Mahan, who would later achieve international fame as a military writer and theorist of naval power.

== Service as USS Despatch ==
Despatch, carrying naval passengers and cargo, departed New York on 4 April for the Gulf of Mexico, returned on 12 June, and decommissioned on 4 July for installation of improved boilers and condensers. The ship was in service with the United States Coast Survey from January to March 1857.

Recommissioned on 1 March 1858, Despatch departed New York on the 6th to cruise along the Gulf coast seeking ships attempting to smuggle slaves into the nation. She headed north in December, arriving Norfolk, Virginia on the 20th where, following a run to Washington, D.C. to tow USS Plymouth to Norfolk, she decommissioned on 2 January 1859.

== Rebuilt and renamed Pocahontas, 1860 ==
Rebuilt at the Norfolk Navy Yard, the ship was enlarged to 694 long tons (705 t), reclassified a second-class sloop, renamed Pocahontas, the first U.S. Navy ship of that name, on 27 January 1860, and recommissioned on 19 March 1860, Commander S. F. Hazzard in command. The revitalized warship got under way for the Gulf on the 27th. Arriving Vera Cruz on 16 April, she joined the Home Squadron and cruised along the Mexican coast protecting American citizens and commerce and carrying diplomatic despatches.

=== Fort Sumter and early Civil War ===
Departing Vera Cruz during the secession crisis, Pocahontas arrived Hampton Roads on 12 March, and on 5 April was assigned to the small joint Army-Navy force sent to Charleston Harbor to provision the federal garrison at Fort Sumter. However, she did not reach Charleston Harbor until the afternoon of the 13th, as Major Robert Anderson was surrendering the beleaguered U.S. fort. The next day, she helped evacuate the Union troops and returned north.

During the first months of the Civil War, Pocahontas patrolled the Potomac River, Rappahannock River, and Chesapeake Bay protecting water approaches to Washington, D.C. against possible Confederate naval attack. She seized steamer James Guy off Machodoc Creek, Virginia on 21 May and fired on and damaged Confederate sidewheel steamer, CSS George Page in Aquia Creek, Va. on 7 July.

Assigned to the newly established South Atlantic Blockading Squadron, Pocahontas departed Washington on 15 October for Newport News, Virginia and sortied from Hampton Roads on the 29th with Flag Officer Samuel F. Du Pont's fleet.

=== Bombardment of Port Royal ===
Under the command of Percival Drayton, Pocahontas arrived at Port Royal, South Carolina, either after its defensive forts had been destroyed by other Union vessels or near the end of the battle; Drayton's brother Thomas was commanding Confederate troops on shore in a literal instance of the "brother against brother" phrase used to describe the American Civil War. At the battle, Pocahontas was apparently piloted into the anchored USS Seminole by its executive officer, a man who would later achieve international fame as a renowned naval theorist: Lt. Alfred Thayer Mahan.

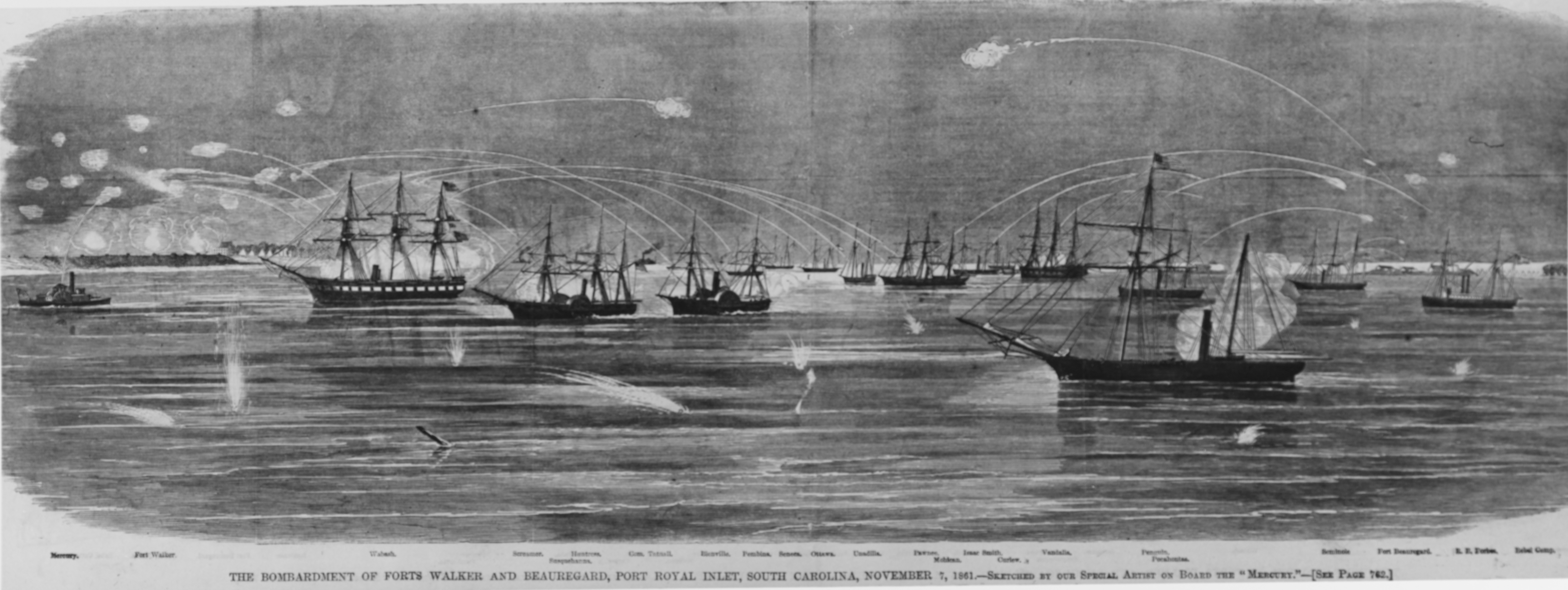
Illustration of attack on Port Royal, South Carolina, 7 November 1861. Pocahontas is seen in the right foreground.

The joint Army-Navy task force captured Port Royal Sound on 7 November, winning for the Union what Du Pont called "the most important point to strike, and the most desirable to have first and to hold...." Port Royal, he continued, "alone admits the large ships – and gives us a naval position on the sea coast as our Army is holding across the Potomac." Subsequent Union naval operations along the Confederate coast fully substantiated Du Pont's appraisal of Port Royal's strategic value.

=== Blockade duty ===
During the following months, Pocahontas operated along the coasts of South Carolina, Georgia, and Florida, performing blockade duty, reconnoitering rivers and inlets, and supporting amphibious operations. She helped to capture Tybee Island, Georgia on 24 November and assisted in towing ships of the "Stone Fleet" to Maffitt's channel and sank them from 20 to 26 January 1862 to block the approaches to Charleston from the sea.

From 28 February-15 March, she participated in an expedition which captured St. Simons Island and Brunswick, Georgia, and Fernandia, Florida. She then continued blockade duty through the spring and early summer. On 14 August, Pocahontas and tug Treaty fought Confederate troops ashore along some 20 mi (32 km) of the Black River while trying to capture steamer Nina. Later that month she was ordered north for repairs and arrived Philadelphia Navy Yard on the 31st.

Assigned to the West Gulf Blockading Squadron, Pocahontas departed Philadelphia, Pennsylvania on 2 October and reported to Admiral David Farragut at Pensacola, Florida on the 18th. The steamer performed blockade duty off Mobile Bay where she captured British steamer Antona with a valuable cargo of munitions and merchandise on 6 January 1863. On 5 March, her guns destroyed blockade running sloop Josephine, previously forced aground by USS Aroostook near Fort Morgan. After repairs at New Orleans, Louisiana from 6 July-19 August, Pocahontas sailed north. Damaged severely in a storm during the passage, the steamer arrived on 7 September and decommissioned a week later for repairs.

=== End of Civil War, decommissioning ===
Recommissioned 16 March 1864, Pocahontas sailed for the gulf on 14 April and arrived New Orleans on 9 May. On blockade duty for the remainder of the year, she cruised along the coast of Louisiana and Texas, operating primarily off Sabine Pass. After repairs at New Orleans from 22 December 1864 – 23 April 1865, the steamer returned to the Texas coast where she served until departing Galveston, Texas on 6 July for the east coast. After stops at Pensacola and Port Royal, South Carolina Pocahontas arrived New York on 25 July and decommissioned at the New York Navy Yard on the 31st. Sold at New York on 30 November, the ship was reduced to a bark and served as Abby Bacon until 1868.

== See also ==
- Union Navy
