= James B. Terrill =

Confederate Army general (1838–1864)

James Barbour Terrill
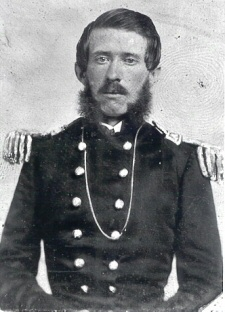
- James B. Terrill
- Born: February 20, 1838; Bath County, Virginia, U.S.
- Died: May 30, 1864 (aged 26); Hanover County, Virginia
- Military career
- Allegiance: Virginia; Confederate States of America
- Branch: Virginia Militia; Confederate States Army
- Service years: 1859-1861; 1861-1864
- Rank: Major (Militia); Brigadier General
- Commands: 13th Virginia Infantry
- Conflicts: See list: American Civil War; First Battle of Bull Run; Jackson's Valley campaign; Peninsula campaign; Battle of Gaines' Mill; Battle of White Oak Swamp; Battle of Malvern Hill; Northern Virginia campaign; Battle of Cedar Mountain; Second Battle of Bull Run; Battle of Antietam; Battle of Fredericksburg; Battle of Chancellorsville; Gettysburg campaign; Overland Campaign; Battle of the Wilderness; Battle of Spotsylvania; Battle of Bethesda Church †

James B. Terrill, often identified as James Barbour Terrill (February 20, 1838 – May 30, 1864) was a lawyer and an officer in the Confederate States Army.

He was practicing law in Warm Springs, Virginia, when the American Civil War began. He joined the Confederate Army and was elected major of the 13th Virginia Infantry Regiment in May 1861. He became colonel of the regiment after the Battle of Chancellorsville on May 15, 1863. On May 30, 1864, he was killed in action at the Battle of Totopotomoy Creek or Battle of Bethesda Church, which immediately preceded the Battle of Cold Harbor during the Overland Campaign. Terrill had already been nominated to the grade of brigadier general. The Confederate Senate posthumously confirmed the appointment on May 31, 1864, to rank from June 1, 1864.

== Early life ==
James Barbour Terrill was the son of Colonel William H. Terrill. For many years, William Terrill was the prosecuting attorney for Bath County, Virginia.

James B. Terrill was a graduate of Virginia Military Institute, class of 1858. He studied law in Lexington, Virginia, at the school of the Hon. John W. Brockenbrough. Starting in 1860 and when the Civil War began, he was practicing law in Warm Springs, Virginia.

James Terrill was the brother of Confederate Private Phillip Terrill, who was killed in action at the Battle of Cedar Creek; Union General William Rufus Terrill, an 1853 graduate of the United States Military Academy at West Point, New York, who was mortally wounded on October 8, 1862, at the Battle of Perryville, and died the next day; and Emily Terrill Porterfield, the wife of Confederate Colonel George A. Porterfield.

Virginia Governor Henry A. Wise appointed Terrill a major of cavalry in the state militia in 1859. When the Virginia Secession Convention effectively took Virginia out of the Union, Terrill hurried to Harpers Ferry to report for duty.

== American Civil War service ==
In May 1861, James B. Terrill was elected major of the 13th Virginia Infantry Regiment. The colonel of the regiment was A. P. Hill, later Lieutenant General, and the lieutenant colonel was James A. Walker, later Brigadier General. Terrill served at the Battle of First Manassas, in Jackson's Valley Campaign, during the Seven Days Battles, at the Battle of Cedar Mountain, Battle of Second Manassas, Battle of Antietam, Battle of Fredericksburg, Battle of Chancellorsville, Gettysburg campaign, the Battle of the Wilderness and the Battle of Spotsylvania Court House. He was promoted first to lieutenant colonel and then after the Battle of Chancellorsville, on May 15, 1863, he was promoted to colonel of the regiment.

Terrill was killed in action at the Battle of Totopotomoy Creek or the Battle of Bethesda Church in Hanover County, Virginia on May 30, 1864, a few days before the Battle of Cold Harbor, which took place about 3 or 4 miles to the south. Terrill was buried at Bethesda Church, near the battlefield, by Union troops.

== Posthumous promotion ==
James Barbour Terrill had already been nominated to the grade of brigadier general when he was killed at the Battle of Bethesda Church. The Confederate Senate confirmed his appointment the next day, May 31, 1864, to rank from June 1, 1864.

== See also ==
- List of American Civil War generals (Confederate)
