= Battle of Totopotomoy Creek =

Battle of the American Civil War

Coordinates: 37.6340°N 77.2987°W

Battle of Totopotomoy Creek (Battle of Bethesda Church)
- Part of the American Civil War
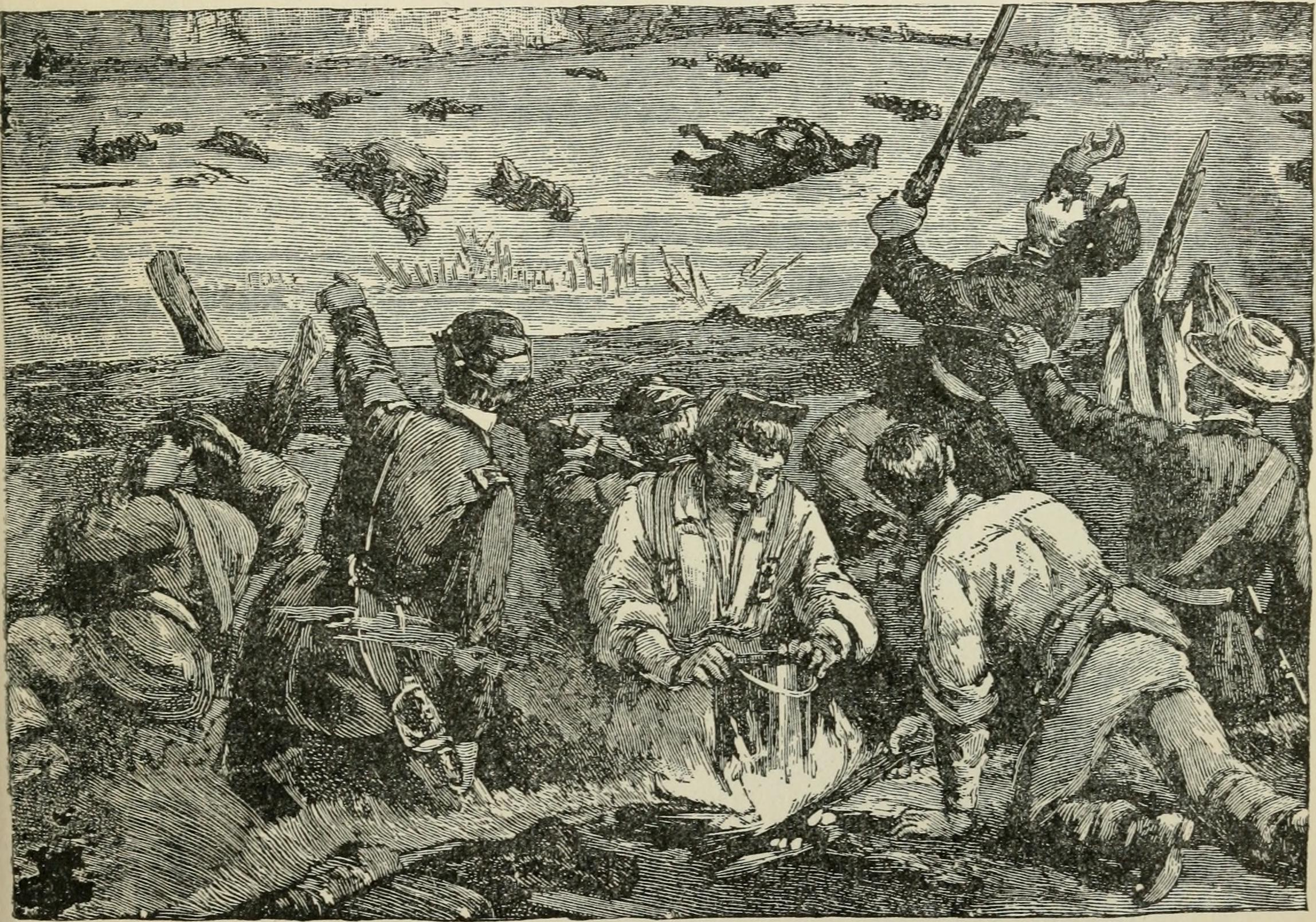
- Union troops behind log breastworks near Bethesda Church
Date	May 28–30, 1864
Location	Hanover County, Virginia
Result	Inconclusive

Belligerents
United States (Union)	CSA (Confederacy)

Commanders and leaders
(United States) Ulysses S. Grant (United States) George G. Meade	Robert E. Lee; Jubal A. Early

Units involved
(United States) Army of the Potomac; V Corps	Army of Northern Virginia; Second Corps

Casualties and losses
731 total (679 killed and wounded, 52 captured)	1,593 total (263 killed, 961 wounded, 369 missing/captured)

The Battle of Totopotomoy Creek locally /tɪˈpɒtoʊmiː/, also called the Battle of Bethesda Church, Crumps Creek, Shady Grove Road, and Hanovertown, was fought in Hanover County, Virginia on May 28–30, 1864, as part of Union Lt. Gen. Ulysses Grant's Overland Campaign against Confederate Gen. Robert E. Lee's Army of Northern Virginia.

As Grant continued his attempts to maneuver around Lee's right flank and lure him into a general battle in the open, Lee saw an opportunity to attack the advancing V Corps, under Maj. Gen. Gouverneur K. Warren with the Second Corps of Lt. Gen. Jubal Early. Early's divisions under Maj. Gens. Robert E. Rodes and Stephen Dodson Ramseur drove the Union troops back to Shady Grove Road, but Ramseur's advance was stopped by a fierce stand of infantry and artillery fire. Grant ordered his other corps commanders to conduct a supporting attack along the entire Confederate line, which was entrenched behind Totopotomoy Creek, but only the II Corps of Maj. Gen. Winfield S. Hancock crossed the stream; they were quickly repulsed. After the battle, the Union army resumed its moves to the southeast and the Battle of Cold Harbor.

== Background ==
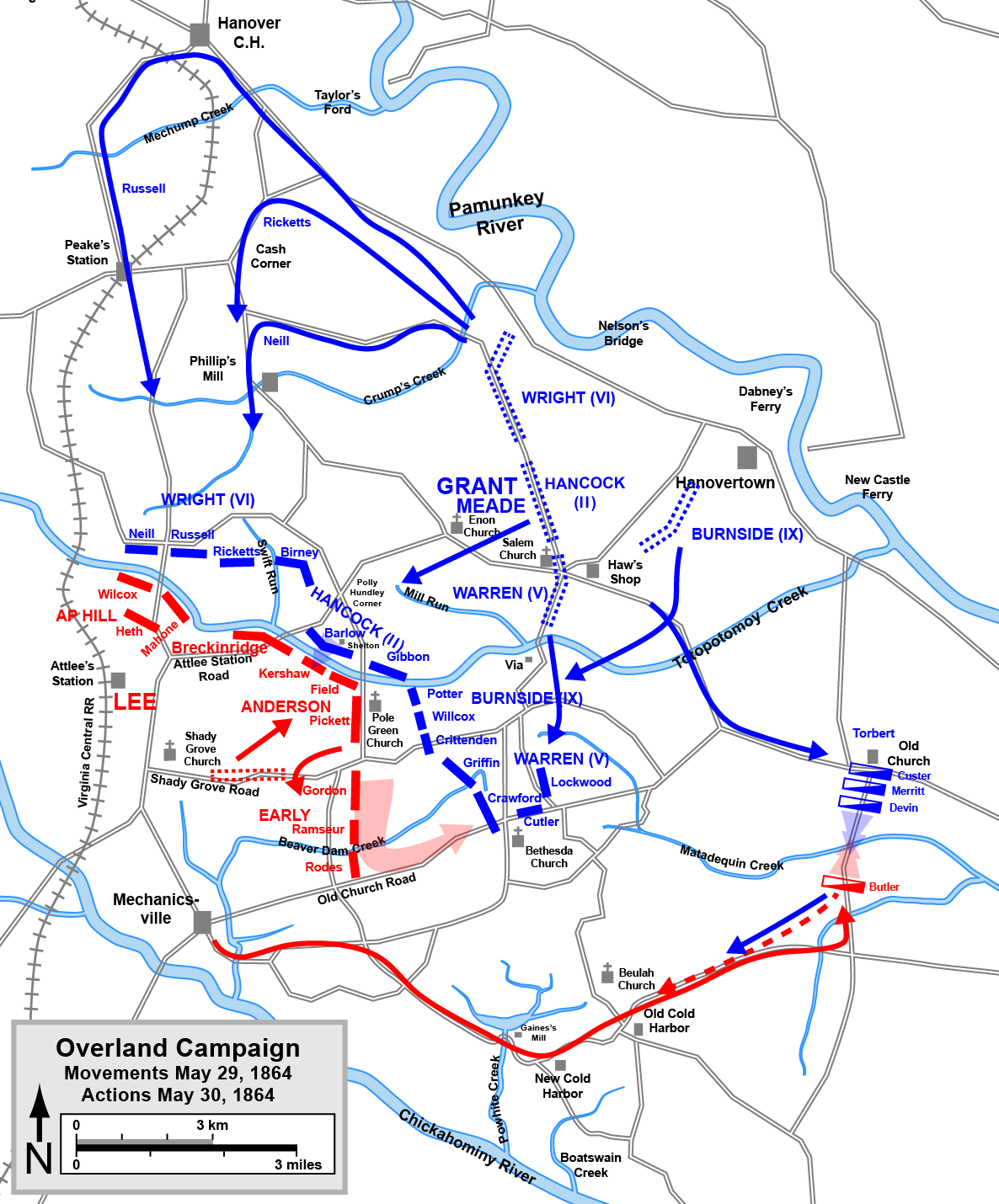
Movements in the Overland Campaign, May 29, and actions May 30, 1864 Confederate Union

After Grant's army escaped from the trap that Lee had set for it at the Battle of North Anna, it began to move again around the right flank of Lee's army, in a continuation of the maneuvering that had characterized the campaign throughout May 1864. It traveled southeast on the north bank of the Pamunkey River, hoping to find the appropriate place to break through Lee's lines. On May 27, Union cavalry established a bridgehead on the south side of the river, near the Hanovertown Ford. As Grant's infantry crossed, cavalry divisions from both armies fought to a standstill at the Battle of Haw's Shop on May 28.

Lee's army was in precarious shape as it stood in entrenchments behind Totopotomoy Creek. Although the cavalry action at Haw's Shop had given Lee valuable intelligence that indicated Grant's avenue of approach, the Confederates were short on supplies, due to the Union disruption of the Virginia Central Railroad. They were also short on men. Lee requested that General P.G.T. Beauregard send him reinforcements from his 12,000-man army, sitting relatively idle as they bottled up Maj. Gen. Benjamin Butler's army at Bermuda Hundred. Beauregard initially refused Lee's request, citing the potential threat from Butler. Lee was determined despite this disappointment, and despite the persistence of his recent dysentery at North Anna. He wrote to President Davis, "If General Grant advances tomorrow I will engage him with my present force." (On May 30, appeals to Confederate President Jefferson Davis caused Beauregard to relent and send 7,000 men, the division of Maj. Gen. Robert Hoke, to join Lee.)

On May 29, Grant's army advanced southwest to confront Lee. Since most of his cavalry was occupied elsewhere, he decided to use infantry for a reconnaissance in force. The II Corps of Maj. Gen. Winfield S. Hancock followed the Richmond–Hanovertown Road (also known as Atlee Station Road) to the creek. Finding that Lee was firmly entrenched on the far bank, Hancock's men began digging in. The V Corps, under Maj. Gen. Gouverneur K. Warren, extended the II Corps line to the left, placing Brig. Gen. Charles Griffin's division across the creek onto Shady Grove Road. Maj. Gen. Horatio G. Wright's VI Corps was sent northwest from Hanovertown toward Hanover Court House, led by Brig. Gen. David A. Russell's division. Maj. Gen. Ambrose Burnside's IX Corps was in reserve near Haw's Shop and Maj. Gen. Philip Sheridan's Cavalry Corps was far to the Union left, near Old Church. The Confederate line, from left to right, consisted of the corps of Lt. Gen. A.P. Hill, the independent division of Maj. Gen. John C. Breckinridge, just returned from the Shenandoah Valley, and the corps of Maj. Gen. Richard H. Anderson and Lt. Gen. Jubal A. Early. No action beyond minor skirmishing occurred during the day.

The battle would be fought along Totopotomoy Creek, near the 1862 battlefield of Gaines' Mill, at Hanover, and at Bethesda Church, north of Gaines' Mill and Old Cold Harbor.

== Battle ==
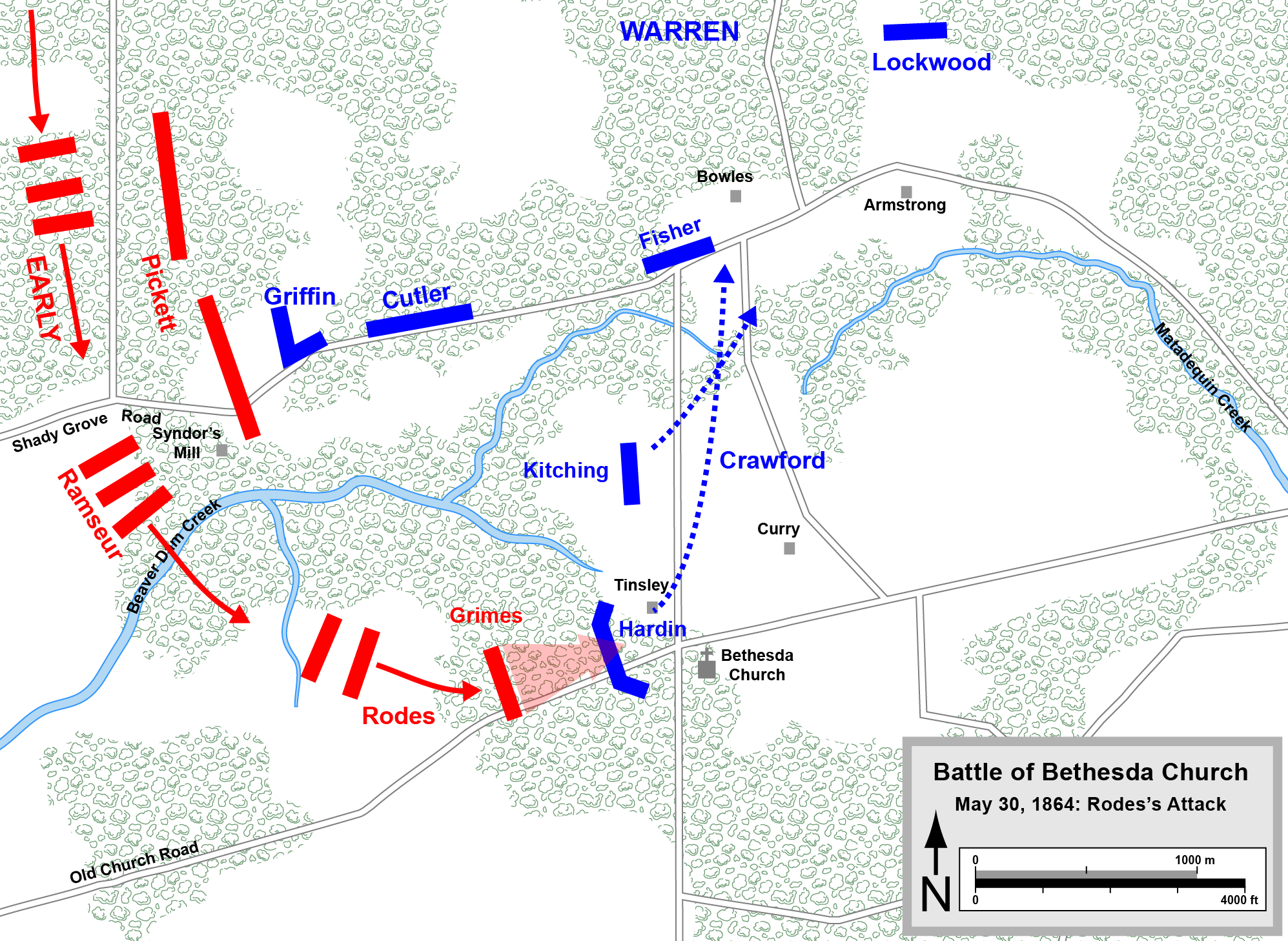
Battle of Bethesda Church, Rodes's attack

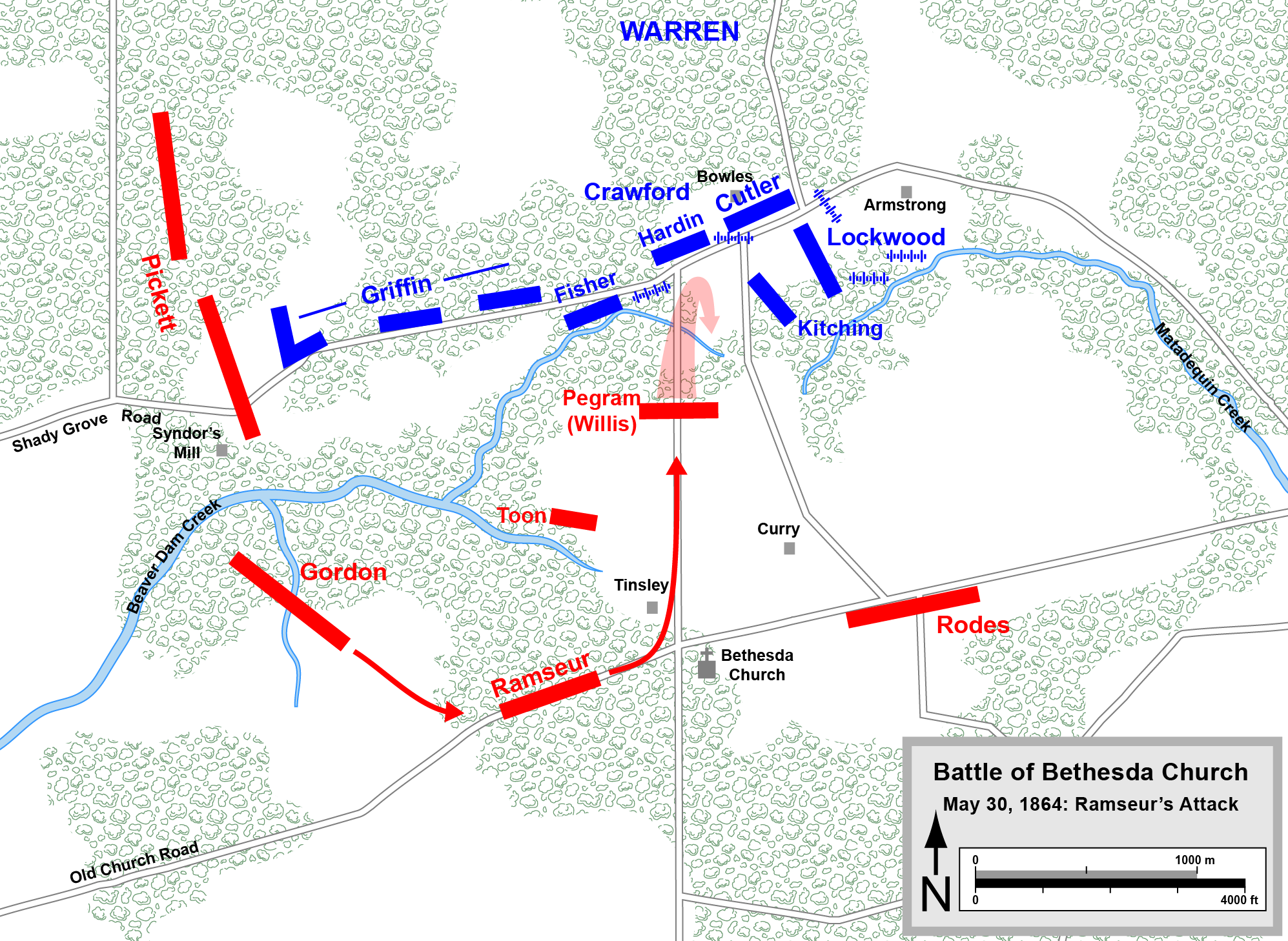
Battle of Bethesda Church, Ramseur's attack

Grant began a general advance on May 30. Wright's corps was to move south against A.P. Hill on the Confederate left, while Hancock attacked across the creek against Breckinridge in the center, and Warren moved west toward Early along Shady Grove Road. Wright's advance became bogged down in the swampy land near Crump's Creek, delaying his VI Corps until late in the day. Hancock's skirmishers captured some of Breckinridge's rifle pits, but made little progress against the main Confederate line. Maj. Gen. George G. Meade (who commanded the Army of the Potomac under the supervision of Grant) ordered Burnside's reserve corps to assist Hancock, but they arrived too late in the day to have an effect on the battle. On the Union left, Warren moved the rest of his V Corps across the creek and deployed on Shady Grove Road. They began probing west along the road, Griffin leading, followed by the divisions of Maj. Gen. Samuel W. Crawford and Brig. Gen. Lysander Cutler.

Lee interpreted these movements as a continuation of Grant's campaign strategy to move around the Confederate right flank and toward the southeast. He ordered Early's corps, which was entrenched across Warren's path, to attack the V corps with the assistance of Anderson's corps. Early planned to send the division of Maj. Gen. Robert E. Rodes on a flanking march along Old Church Road, turning north at Bethesda Church, and follow paths that his cavalry had precut through the underbrush to smash into Warren's rear areas.

As the V corps moved forward slowly, Warren became concerned about the safety of his left flank. He directed Crawford's division to move south along a farm track to Old Church Road, where they erected simple breastworks. Crawford sent forward the brigade of Col. Martin Davis Hardin, men of the Pennsylvania Reserves whose enlistments were due to expire that same day; one of his regiments, the 13th Pennsylvania Reserves, was already eligible for discharge. To their right were two large but inexperienced regiments under Col. J. Howard Kitching. Rodes's men marched directly into Hardin's brigade at about noon and routed them. The retreat to behind Beaver Dam Creek was contagious and Crawford's entire division formation collapsed, exposing the V Corps' left flank.

Unfortunately for the Confederates, Rodes lost control of his men, who ran beyond their objectives and descended into confusion. Rodes hesitated to continue with Early's plan, which called for him to push north into the rear area of Warren's corps. Much of Early's corps was still in march column. Also, Anderson's corps, which was supposed to support Early, was delayed in arriving. Warren began shifting his corps to face south toward Early and Crawford reformed at the farm lane. Griffin's division moved in to support him and the V Corps artillery, under Col. Charles S. Wainwright, arrived and set up several batteries north of Shady Grove Road, on Crawford's left. Griffin's division dug in on Crawford's right.

Maj. Gen. Stephen Dodson Ramseur of Early's corps, newly promoted to division command, recklessly charged the Union artillery at 6:30 p.m. The assault was poorly conceived in many dimensions, and Early gave permission only reluctantly. Gordon's division was still deploying and could not support the attack. Rodes's men were too occupied with protecting the Confederate right to assist. Ramseur's brigade under Brig. Gen. Thomas F. Toon was pinned down by Federal fire on its open left flank. Therefore, the only brigade that actually attacked was Pegram's Brigade, commanded by Col. Edward Willis. They advanced heroically through a severe crossfire of rifle and cannon fire and were able to close within 50 yards of the Union position. Willis was mortally wounded and the brigade fell back to its starting point.

Ramseur's attack was a costly repulse, but the Southern soldiers' heroism earned the admiration of the Union soldiers who witnessed it. The historian of the 13th Pennsylvania Reserves recorded the event: "The slaughter was so sickening that Major Hartshorne leaped to his feet and called upon his assailants to surrender. Some hundreds did so. Rebels or no rebels, their behavior and bearing during the charge had won the admiration of their captors, who did not hesitate to express it." A surviving Virginian recalled, "Our line melted away as if by magic. Every brigade, staff and field officer was cut down, (mostly killed outright) in an incredibly short time."

Meade ordered a general assault across the line to relieve pressure on Warren, but none of his corps commanders were in positions to comply immediately. However, Warren's men had extricated themselves from their predicament without additional assistance. The repulse of Ramseur's division discouraged Early and he ordered his corps to withdraw a short distance to the west. He blamed Anderson for not arriving in time to assist, but the soldiers blamed Ramseur, who had ordered the charge without sufficient reconnaissance.

While the infantry battled at the creek and the church, the cavalry of the two armies clashed to the east across Matadequin Creek in the Battle of Old Church.

== Aftermath ==
Federal casualties were 731 (679 killed and wounded, 52 captured), versus 1,593 (263 killed, 961 wounded, 369 missing/captured) Confederate. Confederate Col. Edward Willis, a popular former member of Stonewall Jackson's staff, was mortally wounded during Ramseur's ill-considered assault. Confederate Brig. Gen. James B. Terrill was also killed at Bethesda Church.

Of more concern to Lee than Early's failed attack was intelligence he received that reinforcements were heading Grant's way. Just as Hoke's division was leaving Bermuda Hundred, the 16,000 men of Maj. Gen. William F. "Baldy" Smith's XVIII Corps were withdrawn from Butler's Army of the James at Grant's request and they were moving down the James River and up the York to the Pamunkey. If Smith moved due west from White House Landing to Cold Harbor, 3 miles southeast of Bethesda Church and Grant's left flank, the extended Union line would be too far south for the Confederate right to contain it. Lee sent his cavalry under Maj. Gen. Fitzhugh Lee to secure the crossroads at Cold Harbor.

On May 31 Hancock's II Corps again crossed Totopotomoy Creek, but found that the Confederate defense line stood well behind the actual creek bed. Grant realized that the strength of the Confederate position meant another stalemate was at hand. He began shifting his army southward toward Cold Harbor on the night of May 31.

There was no doubt that Lee's whole army ... was close at hand and strongly entrenched again. Grant ... declared emphatically he would not run his head against heavy works.

— Charles A. Dana, representative of the War Department, accompanying Grant.

== Battlefield preservation ==
Richmond National Battlefield Park owns and maintains 124 acres (0.50 km^{2}) acres from the Shelton House to the banks of Totopotomoy Creek, the area in which the II Corps attacked on May 30 and May 31. The site opened to the public on September 10, 2011. The Association for the Preservation of Virginia Antiquities owns 35 acres (0.14 km^{2}) with extensive earthworks around Bethesda Church. The Civil War Trust (a division of the American Battlefield Trust) and its partners have acquired and preserved 132 acres (0.53 km^{2}) of the battlefield.
