= Thomas Drayton =

American politician and slave owner

Thomas Fenwick Drayton
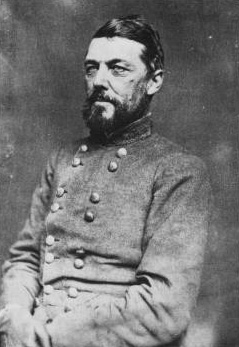
- Born: August 24, 1809; Charleston, South Carolina
- Died: February 18, 1891 (aged 81); Florence, South Carolina
- Burial place: Elmwood Cemetery, Charlotte, North Carolina
- Military career
- Allegiance: United States of America; Confederate States of America
- Branch: United States Army; Confederate States Army
- Service years: 1828–1836 (USA), 1861–1865 (CSA)
- Rank: Second Lieutenant (USA); Brigadier General (CSA)
- Conflicts: American Civil War; Battle of Port Royal; Battle of Thoroughfare Gap; Second Battle of Bull Run; Battle of South Mountain; Battle of Antietam

Thomas Fenwick Drayton (August 24, 1809 – February 18, 1891) was an American planter, politician, railroad president, slave owner and military officer from Charleston, South Carolina. He served in the United States Army and then as a brigadier general in the Confederate States Army during the American Civil War. His brother, Percival Drayton, was a Naval Officer and fought on the Union side during the war.

== Early life and career ==
Drayton was a native of South Carolina, most likely born in Charleston. He was the son of William Drayton, a prominent lawyer, soldier, and US Representative. Thomas' grandfather, William Drayton Sr., was a judge for the province of East Florida (1763–1780) and appointed as the first Federal judge of the new United States District Court for the District of South Carolina. In 1833, following the Nullification Crisis, William Drayton (who was a unionist) took all the family to Philadelphia, Pennsylvania, except Thomas, who chose to stay in the South.

Drayton graduated in 1828 from the United States Military Academy, where he was a classmate of Jefferson Davis, who became his lifelong friend. Drayton was commissioned as a second lieutenant in the 6th U.S. Infantry.

Four years later, Drayton resigned from the US Army and became a civil engineer for railroad construction in Charleston, Louisville, and Cincinnati for two years before he returned to plantation life. He was a captain in the state militia for five years.

Drayton was elected to the South Carolina state legislature and was an outspoken supporter of states rights and slavery. He eventually owned 102 slaves at Fish Haul Plantation, which his wife had brought to their marriage. While a member of the South Carolina State Senate, Drayton also was President of the Charleston & Savannah Railroad from 1853 until 1856.

== Marriage and family ==
In 1832 Drayton married Catherine Pope of a wealthy planter family in Edisto, South Carolina. Her family owned Coggins Point Plantation and Fish Haul Plantation on Hilton Head Island. The Draytons had several children. Two of Drayton's sons also served in the Civil War.

== Civil War ==
Drayton was appointed a Brigadier General in September 1861 and placed in command of the military district at Port Royal, South Carolina. Drayton subsequently used Coggins Point Plantation and Fish Haul Plantation, which his wife owned, as headquarters in the defense of Hilton Head Island. Drayton assigned many of his own 102 slaves on the island to construct defenses and do other work to support the Confederates.

At the Battle of Port Royal later that year, troops under his command at Fort Walker and Fort Beauregard came under attack by ships of the Union Navy, including the USS Pocahontas, commanded by his brother, Percival Drayton. Thomas Drayton's son, Lieutenant William Drayton, also fought with the Confederates in defense of the forts. After a lengthy bombardment, both forts fell to the Union attackers, who subsequently occupied much of the region. They gained an important deepwater port in coastal Carolina. For the remainder of the war Union naval operations against First Battle of Charleston Harbor and the Union Blockade were both supported by the port.

In 1862, Drayton was assigned command of an infantry brigade composed of the 15th South Carolina Infantry, the 3d Battalion S.C. Inf. and three Georgia infantry regiments: the 50th and 51st and Phillips' Georgia Legion. The brigade joined the Army of Northern Virginia after the Seven Days Battles and became part of the Right Wing of the Army of Northern Virginia under Lt. Gen. James Longstreet. Drayton led his brigade at Second Bull Run and in the Maryland Campaign.

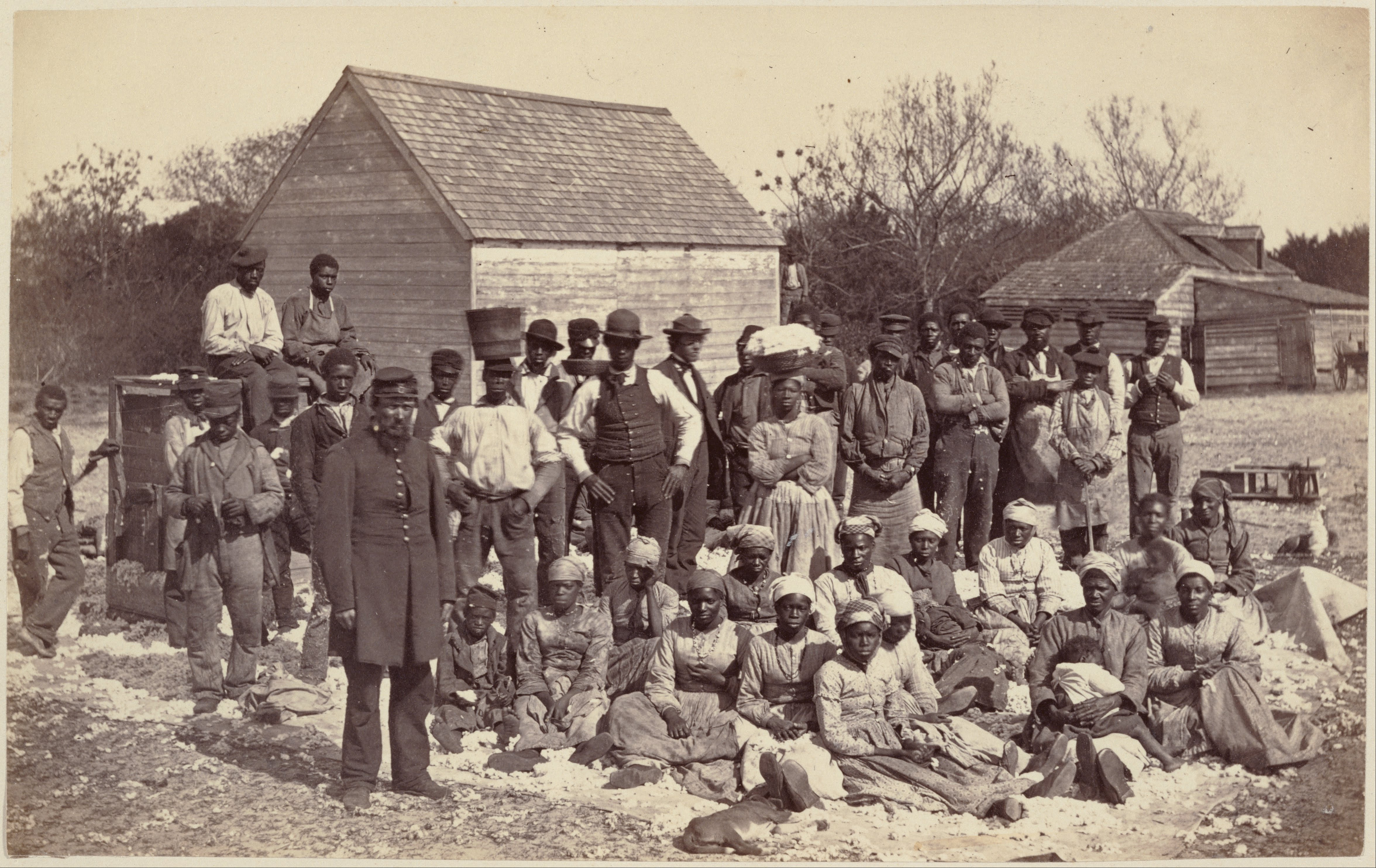
Slaves of Gen. Thomas F. Drayton, Hilton Head, S.C. in 1862 after Drayton deserted them, fleeing from the Union army (Photographer Henry P. Moore via Library of Congress)

Robert E. Lee became displeased with Drayton's performance. Drayton had failed to get his brigade into action at Second Bull Run, and it was then driven from the field in panic at both South Mountain and Antietam. Lee complained that Drayton was unable to keep his brigade properly organized, failing to file reports and returns, and that in each battle the brigade had been engaged in most of its colonels were AWOL, leaving the regiments commanded by inexperienced majors and captains. The brigade was broken up and its regiments transferred to other brigades. Drayton himself was transferred to the Western Theater to command a brigade in Sterling Price's army. During the final two years of the war, he mainly performed administrative duties in the Trans-Mississippi Theater, although he did briefly command a division in early 1864.

== Postbellum activities ==
Following the surrender of Confederate forces in the spring of 1865, Drayton moved to Dooly County, Georgia, where he managed a plantation. Destitute and unable to reclaim his confiscated property in South Carolina, in 1871, he moved to Charlotte, North Carolina, where he sold insurance for a living. Drayton was president of the South Carolina Immigrant Society until shortly before his death in Florence, South Carolina, at the age of 81. He was buried in Elmwood Cemetery in Charlotte.

Drayton is mentioned in an explanatory panel erected in 1985 by the state of South Carolina near Hilton Head in Beaufort County.

== See also ==
- List of American Civil War generals (Confederate)
- Drayton Island
