= Percival Drayton =

United States Navy officer (1812–1865)

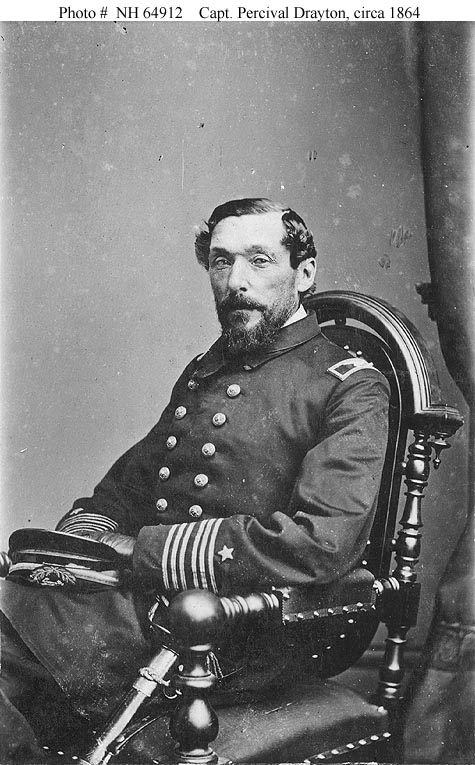
- Captain Drayton, circa 1864–65
- Born: August 25, 1812; Charleston, South Carolina, U.S.
- Died: August 4, 1865 (aged 52); Washington, D.C., U.S.
- Burial place: Laurel Hill Cemetery, Philadelphia, Pennsylvania, U.S.
- Military career
- Allegiance: United States of America
- Branch: United States Navy
- Service years: 1827–1865
- Rank: Captain
- Commands: USS Pocahontas; USS Pawnee; USS Passaic; USS Hartford
- Conflicts: Paraguay expedition American Civil War: Battle of Port Royal; Battle of Fort McAllister; Battle of Mobile Bay

Percival Drayton (August 25, 1812 – August 4, 1865) was a career United States Navy officer. He served in the Brazil Squadron, the Mediterranean Squadron and as a staff officer during the Paraguay Expedition.

During the American Civil War, he commanded naval forces against Confederate forts defended by his brother Thomas F. Drayton in the Battle of Port Royal. He served as Fleet Captain in the West Gulf Blockading Squadron and commanded the sloop-of-war USS Hartford during the Battle of Mobile Bay under Rear Admiral David Farragut. It was to Drayton that Farragut issued his famous command, "Damn the torpedoes! Full steam ahead!"

== Early life and family ==
Coat of Arms of Percival Drayton

Drayton was born in Charleston, South Carolina, to Anna Gadsden and William Drayton, a prominent lawyer and U.S. Representative. He had an older brother Thomas F. Drayton. In 1833 the family relocated to Philadelphia, Pennsylvania, following the Nullification Crisis, as William Drayton was a unionist. He was appointed as president of the Second Bank of the United States. Thomas, already grown, stayed in South Carolina and became a successful farmer and state senator.

William Drayton was a descendant of what had been a large landholding family in South Carolina. In the 1770s, his father William Drayton, Sr. had sold his property in South Carolina to his uncle John Drayton, after being appointed in the 1770s as chief justice of the Province of East Florida. John Drayton's branch consolidated the holdings at Magnolia Plantation. After the American Revolutionary War, William Drayton, Sr. returned to South Carolina with his family and became prominent in its politics.

== Military career ==
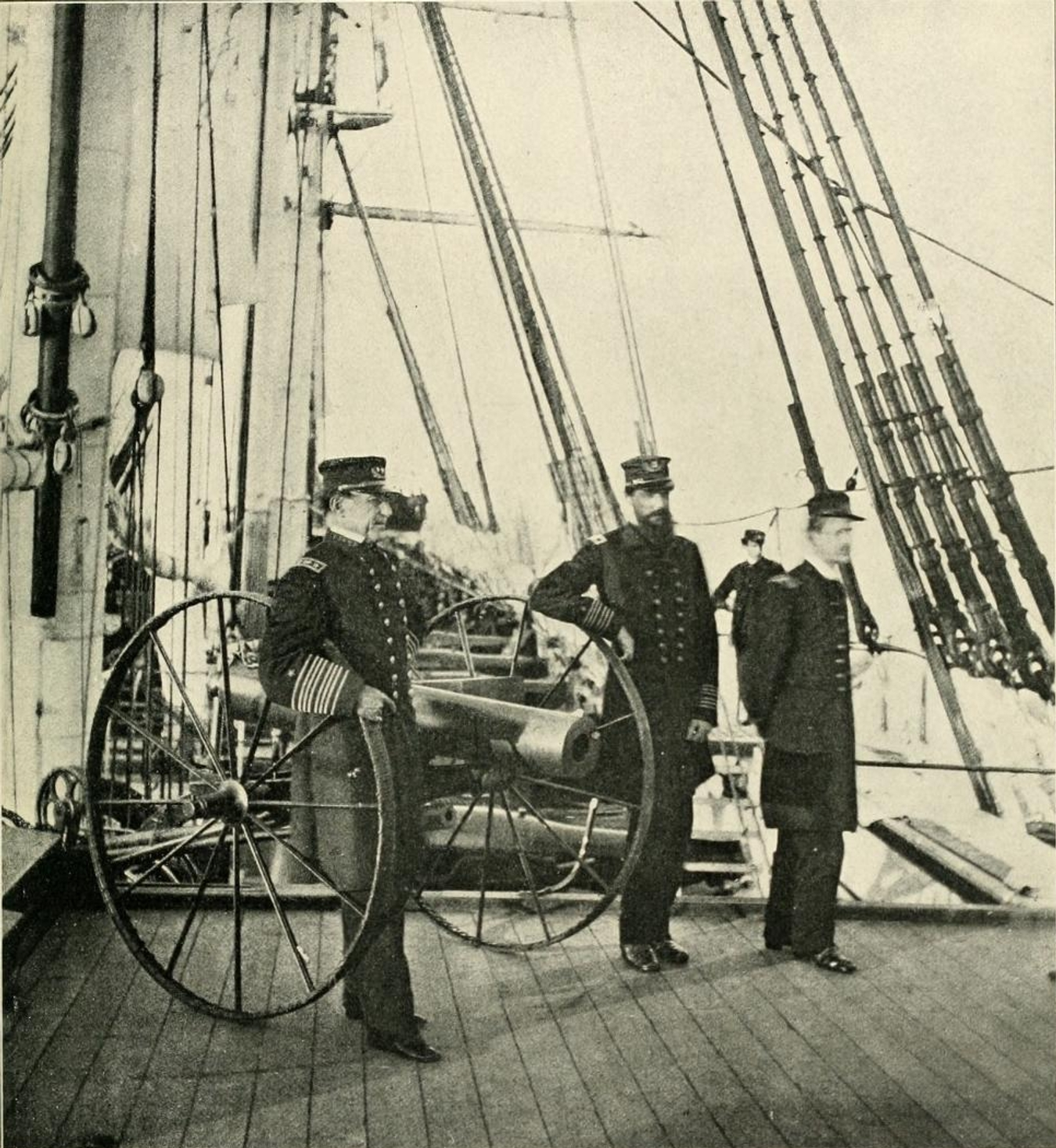
Rear Admiral David Glasgow Farragut and Captain Percival Drayton, chief of staff, stand on the deck of the Hartford, after the victory in Mobile Bay, August 1864.

Percival Drayton was appointed a midshipman in the Navy in December 1827. He served two tours of duty with the Brazil Squadron in the South Atlantic from 1828 to 1830 and from 1839 to 1842. He served four tours in the Mediterranean Squadron from 1831 to 1832, 1835 to 1838, 1849 to 1850 and 1850 and 1852. He served one tour in the Pacific Ocean from 1842 to 1843 and one in the East Indies from 1845 to 1848.

During his time in the Brazil Squadron, stationed out of Rio de Janeiro, he served as a midshipman aboard the frigate Hudson. He attained the rank of Lieutenant in February 1838 and served aboard the schooner Enterprise. His two years in the Pacific were served aboard the schooner Yorktown. He had shore duty assignments at the Naval Observatory in Washington, D.C., and at the New York Navy Yard.

Promoted to commander in September 1855, Drayton served as a staff officer during the Paraguay Expedition aboard the frigate Sabine. In 1859, he returned to the United States and was assigned as a member of the Board of Examiners to the United States Naval Academy in Annapolis, Maryland. At the beginning of the Civil War in 1861, he was stationed at the Philadelphia Navy Yard, where he directed the construction and renovation of ships for war service.

In the fall of 1861, Drayton was placed in command of the gunboat Pocahontas; he participated in the capture of Port Royal, South Carolina. His older brother Thomas F. Drayton, a graduate of West Point and classmate of Jefferson Davis, had resigned with the secession of South Carolina. He was a general of the Confederate army and commanded the forts destroyed in this engagement. The Union forces captured Hilton Head, Beaufort and Parris Island and used them as a base to continue operations against Savannah, Georgia and Charleston, South Carolina.

Union Navy ironclads Weehawken, Montauk and Passaic firing on Fort Moultrie, September 8, 1863

Drayton became commanding officer of the sloop-of-war Pawnee and was active in inshore operations in the waters of South Carolina, Georgia and northern Florida through the summer of 1862. He was promoted to Captain in July 1862. In September 1862, he was given command of the ironclad Passaic. He oversaw her outfitting and worked with John Ericsson to improve elements of monitor design. In April 1863, Drayton commanded his ship as part of a nine ironclad attack on Forts McAllister and Sumter. The attack was unsuccessful and reinforced his opinion concerning the limitations of the monitor type ship for use against well-defended fortifications.

Drayton's next assignment was as Superintendent of Ordnance at the New York Navy Yard. In December 1863 he began a year as Fleet Captain to the commander of the West Gulf Blockading Squadron, Rear Admiral David Glasgow Farragut. He commanded the squadron flagship, the big sloop-of-war Hartford and took part in the August 1864 Battle of Mobile Bay and the following operations within Mobile Bay. It was to Drayton that Farragut shouted his famous command, "Damn the torpedoes! Full steam ahead!".

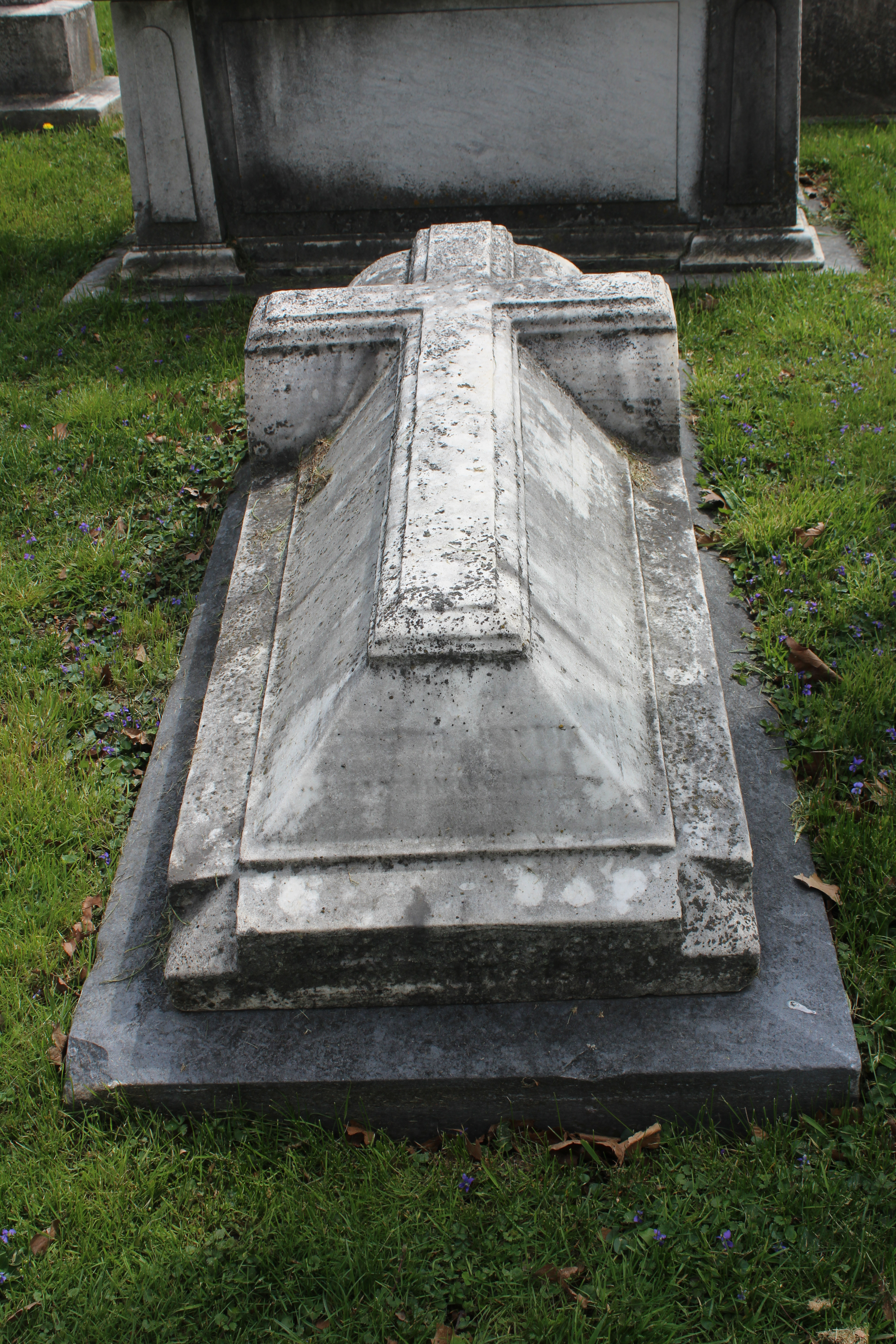
Percival Drayton gravestone in Laurel Hill Cemetery

He was appointed Chief of the Bureau of Navigation in late April 1865. Drayton died of an obstructed bowel in Washington, D.C., on 4 August 1865 and was interred at Laurel Hill Cemetery in Philadelphia, Pennsylvania.

== Namesakes ==
The U.S. Navy has named two destroyers in honor of Percival Drayton, including: Drayton (Destroyer # 23, later DD-23) of 1910–1935; and Drayton (DD-366) of 1936–1946.
