= List of television stations in South Carolina =

This is a list of broadcast television stations that are licensed in the U.S. state of South Carolina.

== Full-power ==
- Stations are arranged by media market served and channel position.

Full-power television stations in South Carolina
Media market	Station	Channel	Primary affiliation(s)	Notes	Refs
Charleston	WCBD-TV	2	NBC, The CW on 2.2		
Charleston	WGWG	4	MeTV		
Charleston	WCSC-TV	5	CBS		
Charleston	WITV	7	PBS (SCETV)	(Note: Satellite of WRLK-TV.)	
Charleston	WTAT-TV	24	Fox		
Charleston	WCIV	36	MyNetworkTV, ABC on 36.2		
Columbia	WIS	10	NBC, The CW on 10.2		
Columbia	WLTX	19	CBS		
Columbia	WOLO-TV	25	ABC		
Columbia	WRJA-TV	27	PBS (SCETV)	(Note: Licensed to Sumter, South Carolina.)	
Columbia	WRLK-TV	35	PBS (SCETV)		
Columbia	WZRB	47	Ion Television		
Columbia	WACH	57	Fox		
Columbia	WKTC	63	MyNetworkTV, Telemundo on 63.2		
Florence-Myrtle Beach	WBTW	13	CBS, MyNetworkTV and Antenna TV on 13.2	(Note: Licensed to Florence, South Carolina.)	
Florence-Myrtle Beach	WPDE-TV	15	ABC, The CW on 15.2		
Florence-Myrtle Beach	WWMB	21	Dabl		
Florence-Myrtle Beach	WHMC	23	PBS (SCETV)	(Note: Licensed to Conway, South Carolina.)	
Florence-Myrtle Beach	WMBF-TV	32	NBC		
Florence-Myrtle Beach	WJPM-TV	33	PBS (SCETV)		
Florence-Myrtle Beach	WFXB	43	Fox		
Greenville–Spartanburg	WYFF	4	NBC, MeTV on 4.2, CBS on 4.3		
Greenville–Spartanburg	WSPA-TV	7	The CW, Ion Television on 7.3	(Note: Licensed to Spartanburg, South Carolina.)	
Greenville–Spartanburg	WGGS-TV	16	Independent		
Greenville–Spartanburg	WHNS	21	Fox		
Greenville–Spartanburg	WNTV	29	PBS (SCETV)		
Greenville–Spartanburg	WNEH	38	PBS (SCETV)	(Note: Licensed to Greenwood, South Carolina.)	
Greenville–Spartanburg	WMYA-TV	40	Dabl	(Note: Licensed to Anderson, South Carolina.)	
Greenville–Spartanburg	WRET-TV	49	PBS (SCETV)		
~Augusta, GA	WEBA-TV	14	PBS (SCETV)	(Note: Licensed to Allendale, South Carolina.)	
~Savannah, GA	WJWJ-TV	16	PBS (SCETV)	(Note: Licensed to Beaufort, South Carolina.)	
~Savannah, GA	WTGS	28	Fox	(Note: Licensed to Hardeeville, South Carolina.)	
~Charlotte, NC	WNSC-TV	30	PBS (SCETV)	(Note: Licensed to Rock Hill, South Carolina.)	
~Charlotte, NC	WMYT-TV	55	The CW		

== Low-power ==
Low-power television stations in South Carolina
Media market	Station	Channel	Primary affiliation(s)	Notes	Refs
Charleston	WHDC-LD	12	Various		
Charleston	WLCN-CD	18	CTN		
Charleston	WLOW-LD	19	Various		
Charleston	WBSE-LD	20	Various		
Charleston	WAZS-LD	22	Quiero TV	(Note: Licensed to North Charleston, South Carolina.)	
Charleston	WZCH-LD	35	Telemundo		
Columbia	WKDC-LD	50	Daystar		
Florence-Myrtle Beach	WGSC-CD	8	Tourist info	(Note: Licensed to Murrells Inlet, South Carolina.)	
Florence-Myrtle Beach	WGSI-CD	8	Tourist info		
Florence-Myrtle Beach	WXIV-LD	14	Telemundo		
Florence-Myrtle Beach	W33DN-D	16	Various		
Florence-Myrtle Beach	WQHI-LD	16	Daystar		
Florence-Myrtle Beach	W15ES-D	35	Telemundo	(Note: Licensed to Georgetown, South Carolina.)	
Florence-Myrtle Beach	WFDY-LD	30	[Blank]		
Greenville–Spartanburg	WWYA-LD	28	Various	(Note: Licensed to Honea Path, South Carolina.)	
Greenville–Spartanburg	WNGS-LD	50	Various		
Greenville–Spartanburg	WSQY-LD	51	Daystar		
~Savannah, GA	W30CV-D	30	Tourist info	(Note: Licensed to Hilton Head Island, South Carolina.)	

== Translators ==
Television station translators in South Carolina
Media market	Station	Channel	Translating	Notes	Refs
Florence-Myrtle Beach	WMBE-LD	13	WBTW		
Florence-Myrtle Beach	W15DC-D	27	WBPI-CD		
Florence-Myrtle Beach	W06DK-D	32	WMBF-TV		
Florence-Myrtle Beach	W18FC-D	32	WMBF-TV		
Florence-Myrtle Beach	W24EX-D	32	WMBF-TV		
Florence-Myrtle Beach	W25FQ-D	32	WMBF-TV		
Florence-Myrtle Beach	W35ED-D	32	WMBF-TV		
Greenville–Spartanburg	W10AJ-D	7	WSPA-TV		
Greenville–Spartanburg	W31DY-D	13	WLOS	(Note: Licensed to Pickens, South Carolina.)	
~Savannah, GA	W31FD-D	31	WTOC-TV	(Note: Licensed to Bluffton and Hilton Head, South Carolina.)	

== Defunct ==
- WGVL Greenville (1953–1956)
- WCOS-TV Columbia (1953–1956)

== See also ==
- South Carolina § Media

== Bibliography ==
- "United States TV Stations: South Carolina", Yearbook of Radio and Television, New York: Radio Television Daily, 1964, OCLC 7469377 – via Internet Archive
- Patricia G. McNeely. "Television". South Carolina Encyclopedia. University of South Carolina.
