= WIS (TV) =

Television station in Columbia, South Carolina

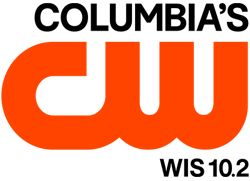
- Columbia, South Carolina; United States
- Channels: Digital: 10 (VHF); Virtual: 10
- Branding: WIS 10; Columbia's CW (10.2)

Programming
- Affiliations: 10.1: NBC; 10.2: The CW; for others, see § Subchannels

Ownership
- Owner: Gray Media; (Gray Television Licensee, LLC)
- Sister stations: WTES-LD

History
- First air date: November 7, 1953
- Former call signs: WIS-TV (1953–1992)
- Former channel numbers: Analog: 10 (VHF, 1953–2009); Digital: 41 (UHF, 2003–2009)
- Former affiliations: ABC (secondary, 1953–1961)
- Call sign meaning: Wonderful Iodine State (from former radio sister)

Technical information
- Licensing authority: FCC
- Facility ID: 13990
- ERP: 57 kW
- HAAT: 481 m (1,578 ft)
- Transmitter coordinates: 34°7′30″N 80°45′22″W

Links
- Public license information: Public file; LMS
- Website: www.wistv.com

WIS (channel 10) is a television station in Columbia, South Carolina, United States, affiliated with NBC and The CW. The station is owned by Gray Media alongside low-power Telemundo affiliate WTES-LD (channel 16). The two stations share studios on Bull and Gervais Streets (US 1/US 378) in downtown Columbia and a transmitter on Rush Road (southeast of I-20) in rural southwestern Kershaw County, outside Lugoff.

== History ==
The station first signed on the air on November 7, 1953. The station's first telecast was a college football game between the University of South Carolina and the University of North Carolina. The Liberty Life Insurance Company, owners of WIS radio (560 AM, now WVOC) through its Broadcasting Company of the South subsidiary, and the Maresco Corporation, owners of WMSC (1320 AM, later WISW) merged their competing applications to avoid what could have been years of hearings and delays. Seven of WMSC's stockholders sold their shares in Maresco and joined the board of the television station, which was initially operated separately from WIS radio. However, the station was based alongside WIS radio at a new facility on Bull Street, where channel 10 is still headquartered today.

Charles Batson signed the station on the air, and remained the station's president and general manager until his retirement in 1983. It was the fourth television station to sign on in South Carolina and the third in the Columbia market, signing on just four months after WCOS-TV (channel 25)—which ceased operations in 1956—and two months after WNOK-TV (channel 67, now WLTX on channel 19, where it moved in 1961). WIS is the third-longest continuously operating station in the state, behind WCSC-TV in Charleston and WNOK/WLTX.

WIS radio (whose call letters stood for "Wonderful Iodine State", in reference to the abundance of iodine in the South Carolina soil) received the last new three-letter call sign in the U.S. on January 23, 1930, and the call sign was later shared with its television sibling. The station has been an NBC affiliate since its inception, owing to its radio sister's longtime affiliation with the NBC Red Network. However, until 1961, when a new channel 25 signed on as WCCA-TV (now WOLO-TV), it maintained a secondary affiliation with ABC, airing its programming outside of NBC network timeslots.

WIS-TV was a major beneficiary of an exception to the Federal Communications Commission (FCC)'s "2 1/2 + 1" plan for allocating VHF television bandwidth. In the early days of broadcast television, there were twelve VHF channels available, and 69 UHF channels (which was later reduced to 56 with the removal of high-band channels 70-83 in the early 1980s). The VHF bands were more desirable because signals broadcasting on that band traveled a longer distance. Because there were only twelve VHF channels available, there were limitations as to how closely the stations could be spaced. With the release of the FCC's Sixth Report and Order in 1952, the Commission outlined a new allocation table for VHF licenses and opened up the UHF band. Through these initiatives, almost all of the United States would be able to receive two commercial VHF channels plus one non-commercial allocation. Most of the rest of the country ("1/2") would be able to receive a third VHF channel. Other areas of the country would be designated as "UHF islands", since they were too close to larger cities for VHF service. The "2" networks became CBS and NBC, "+1" represented non-commercial educational (public television, usually affiliated with NET) stations, and "1/2" became ABC, which, as the smallest and weakest network then, usually wound up with the UHF allocation where no VHF allocation was available.

Originally, Columbia was assigned two VHF licenses, channels 7 and 10. This did not sit well with Walter J. Brown, owner of WSPA (950 AM) and WSPA-FM (98.9) in Spartanburg. He pressed Governor and fellow Spartanburg resident James F. Byrnes to use his influence with the FCC to move channel 7 from Columbia to Spartanburg, allowing him to launch WSPA-TV in 1956.

With this move, Columbia was now sandwiched between Charlotte (which had respectively been awarded channels 3 and 9) to the north, Florence–Myrtle Beach (channel 8, later 13) to the east, Charleston (channels 2, 4, 5, and 7) and Savannah (channels 3, 9, and 11) to the south, Augusta (channels 6 and 12) to the west, and Greenville–Spartanburg–Asheville (channels 4, 7, and 13) to the northwest. This created a huge "doughnut" in central South Carolina where there could be only one VHF license.

WIS-TV was fortunate to gain that license, providing many people in that part of South Carolina with their first clear reception of a television signal. Until the FCC mandated all-channel tuning in 1964, viewers needed a converter to watch UHF stations, and picture quality was marginal at best even with a converter. This allowed channel 10 to become one of the most dominant television stations in the country; for decades, it was the far-and-away market leader in the Midlands.

Channel 10 originally broadcast from a self-supporting tower atop its studios on Bull Street. In 1959, WIS-TV activated its current transmitter tower in Lugoff; the tallest structure located east of the Mississippi River at the time, it more than doubled the station's coverage area and provided at least secondary coverage as far north as Charlotte, as far south as Augusta, as far west as Greenwood and as far east as Florence. This included all but five of the state's 46 counties; in fact, until the arrival of cable television in the market in the late 1970s, channel 10 was one of only two stations that brought a clear signal to much of the outlying portions of the market—the other being WRLK-TV (channel 35), one of the two South Carolina Educational Television stations that serve the area. It would remain the tallest structure in South Carolina until Florence's WPDE-TV activated its signal in 1981. The station's original tower is still used as a backup; it is a longtime fixture of Columbia's skyline and is turned into a "Christmas tree of lights" during the holiday season.

For many years, WIS was one of two NBC affiliates that served the Florence–Myrtle Beach market, since that market was one of the few areas on the East Coast without its own NBC affiliate. It was the NBC affiliate of record for the Pee Dee (Florence) side of the market while Wilmington's WECT was the affiliate of record for Myrtle Beach and the Grand Strand. However, most cable systems on the Myrtle Beach side of the market began carrying WIS in the mid-1980s. After the FCC passed the syndication exclusivity rule in 1989, WIS set up a "virtual station" for cable systems in the Florence–Myrtle Beach market that aired separate syndicated programming for the area. It also began selling advertising specific to the market as well, mostly on the Pee Dee side. This ended when Raycom Media signed on an NBC affiliate within that market, WMBF-TV, in August 2008.

WIS had modest viewership on the South Carolina side of the Charlotte market for several years, especially after that city's NBC affiliation moved to WRET (channel 36, later WPCQ-TV and now WCNC-TV) in 1978. WRET's UHF signal did not have nearly as much penetration as the VHF signal of former NBC affiliate WSOC-TV (channel 9). Even after new owner Westinghouse Broadcasting doubled channel 36's transmitter power in 1979, many viewers on the South Carolina side of the market got a better signal from WIS even though its transmitter was 80 miles (129 km) south of Charlotte. WIS appeared in The Charlotte Observer television listings well into the 1990s, and was carried on many cable systems on the South Carolina side of the Charlotte market well into the 21st century. A similar situation prevailed in Augusta, where WIS provided a stronger signal than WATU/WAGT (channel 26, now defunct) even though its transmitter was 100 miles (161 km) north of Augusta. It remained on most Augusta-area cable systems, including in Augusta itself, well into the new millennium.

The Broadcasting Company of the South acquired several other television stations over the years. It was renamed as the Cosmos Broadcasting Corporation in 1965, with WIS radio and television serving as its flagship stations. Later in the decade, Liberty Life reorganized itself as the Liberty Corporation, with Liberty Life and Cosmos as subsidiaries. Cosmos sold WIS radio in 1986, but kept the WIS calls for channel 10. Liberty sold off its insurance businesses in 2000, bringing channel 10 directly under the Liberty Corporation banner. In 1991, after being known on-air as "TV 10" for most of its history, the station began branding itself as simply "WIS" (this was one year before the "-TV" suffix was officially dropped from its callsign); this lasted until 2003, when it branded as WIS News 10 for both general and newscast branding purposes.

On August 25, 2005, Liberty agreed to merge with Montgomery, Alabama–based Raycom Media. At the time, Raycom had already owned Fox affiliate WACH (channel 57). Raycom could not keep both stations as FCC duopoly rules forbid common ownership of two of the four highest-rated television stations in a single market based on Nielsen total-day ratings data for a given calendar month. Additionally, Columbia has only eight full-power stations, one fewer than what ownership rules allow to legally permit a duopoly in any case. Raycom opted to keep WIS and sold WACH to Barrington Broadcasting.

In February 2003, the station signed on its digital signal, becoming the last "Big Three"-affiliated station in the Columbia market to broadcast a digital signal (after WLTX, which signed on its digital signal in May 2002, and WOLO, which signed on theirs later that year).

WIS' broadcasts became digital-only, effective June 12, 2009. Since the station moved its digital broadcast from RF channel 41 to RF channel 10, the few viewers who watched the station over the air were asked to rescan their sets to continue watching the station. For the first week of digital-only operations, WIS moved to its backup transmitter on Bull Street due to needed upgrades to the main transmitter. As a result, a few viewers who watched channel 10 over the air could not get a clear picture. The station activated its full-power digital signal from its Lugoff tower on June 19.

On June 25, 2018, Atlanta-based Gray Television announced it had reached an agreement with Raycom to merge their respective broadcasting assets (consisting of Raycom's 63 existing owned-and/or-operated television stations, including WIS), and Gray's 93 television stations) under Gray's corporate umbrella. The cash-and-stock merger transaction valued at $3.6 billion—in which Gray shareholders would acquire preferred stock currently held by Raycom—resulted in WIS gaining new sister stations in nearby markets, including CBS affiliate WRDW-TV and NBC affiliate WAGT-CD in Augusta (while separating it from WFXG) in addition to its current Raycom sister stations. The sale was approved on December 20, and was completed on January 2, 2019.

On May 29, 2019, Gray announced that WIS's second digital subchannel would become Columbia's CW affiliate effective September 30, 2019, with "Columbia's CW" replacing WKTC (channel 63). As part of the new affiliation, Bounce TV was moved to WIS-DT3, with Grit moving to WKTC-DT7.

== Programming ==
WIS formerly preempted the third hour of the Today Show to air WIS Today; the third hour now airs on the station. However, as with most NBC affiliates, the station occasionally airs one hour of its The More You Know block on Saturday mornings prior to the station's weekend morning newscast in the event that NBC schedules a sports event during the noon hour on that day.

Over the years, channel 10 preempted NBC programming in moderation—most notably, the soap opera Search for Tomorrow during its NBC tenure from 1982 to 1986, and the 1990–91 NBC revival of Let's Make A Deal during its entire run. Although NBC has historically been far less tolerant of programming preemptions than the other networks, it was more than satisfied with WIS, which was one of its strongest affiliates. Although WIS broadcasts on a 24-hour schedule, it is one of the few remaining U.S. television stations that continues to sign off during the overnight hours for reasons other than necessary transmitter maintenance, occurring annually during the early morning hours of Christmas Day.

In 1963, the station debuted a long-running children's program Mr. Knozit, which was hosted by weather anchor Joe Pinner, who had been hired by WIS-TV a few months before. Four years later, the series would receive a Peabody Award for excellence in public service by way of children's programming. The show ran for 37 years, airing its final episode in 2000. Pinner, known in his later years as "Papa Joe", went into semi-retirement in 2000, but continued to provide weather reports and feature segments on the Friday edition of its noon newscast. He retired for good on September 1, 2018, after 55 years at the station.

WIS maintains the local rights to the highlight program from the South Carolina State Bulldogs (which it airs on Sunday mornings during the college football season); it had held rights to the South Carolina Gamecocks coach's show until the University of South Carolina decided to move the program to regional sports network Fox Sports Carolinas. After the Gamecocks joined the Southeastern Conference, WIS obtained the local television rights to Southeastern Conference football and men's basketball games (which made the station the home of the South Carolina Gamecocks); WOLO-TV (channel 25) and WKTC (channel 63) assumed rights to the games starting with the conference's 2010–11 athletic season. Since 2024, WIS's fourth subchannel has aired select matches featuring the Charleston Battery of the USL Championship.

=== News operation ===
WIS presently broadcasts 40 hours of locally produced newscasts each week (with seven hours on weekdays, two hours on Saturdays and three hours on Sundays); in addition, the station produces the public affairs program Awareness, which airs Sundays at 11 a.m. WIS is a partner in the Raycom News Network, a system designed to rapidly share information on-air and online among Raycom's and Meredith Corporation's widespread groups of television stations (now all owned by Gray). In South Carolina, the company developed a regional network between WIS, WMBF, WCSC-TV in Charleston, WBTV in Charlotte and WHNS-TV in Greenville, in which stations share information, equipment such as satellite trucks and stories filed by the stations. Between them, these five stations cover almost all of South Carolina. Wilmington's WECT and Savannah's WTOC-TV also play a small part in the regional network.

For the better part of channel 10's history, its newscasts dominated the ratings in Columbia. Cosmos/Liberty made it a point to pour significant resources into its stations' news departments from the 1950s onward. This resulted in a higher-quality product than conventional wisdom would suggest for a market of Columbia's size. Although Columbia was the state's largest city for most of the 20th century and well into the new millennium, it has always been a small-to-medium-sized market because the surrounding suburban and rural areas are not much larger than the city itself. The station took full advantage of its near-statewide coverage to establish a tradition for strong local news coverage that continues today. Its dominance was helped by the fact that it was the only VHF station in the market. From the late 1970s until the mid-1990s, it was the only station in the market that offered a full schedule of local newscasts in all four dayparts (morning, midday, early and late evening).

Another factor behind WIS's run atop Columbia's ratings has been talent continuity. These staffers included news anchors Ed Carter and Susan Audé, who gained notoriety for her accomplishments as a reporter and anchor. Audé used a wheelchair due to having been paralyzed in an automobile accident. Carter became the station's main anchor in 1972, and Audé—by then known as Susan Audé Fisher (she divorced in 2000)—joined him at the anchor desk in 1982. The two remained paired together on its weekday evening newscasts until Carter retired in 1998; Audé later retired in 2006. As mentioned above, Joe Pinner served as a weatherman and children's host at the station from 1963 until his retirement in 2018. Jim Gandy, the station's chief meteorologist from 1984 to 1999, was known as "South Carolina's Weatherman"; he was the only area forecaster to predict Hurricane Hugo would make landfall in Charleston. Some other members of the team who have had long tenures included Jack Kuenzie, Dawndy Mercer Plank, and Ben Tanner. Current anchors who have been at the station for more than a decade include Judi Gatson, Von Gaskin, and Rick Henry.

Channel 10's news operation has long been well respected in the industry. In 1997, for instance, Hank Price of Northwestern University's Media Management Center recalled that whenever South Carolina was mentioned in television circles, "WIS' name will quickly come up" because it was seen as "a model for success". NBC affiliate relations director Lloyd Segal said that WIS was so dominant because it was "a midsize market station that acts like a major-market station." He added that at the time, WIS was one of 10 stations that NBC considered "outstanding partners" in gathering local news; WIS was by far the smallest station in that group, the other nine were in large markets.

While WIS still leads overall, it has spent the new millennium in a spirited battle for first place with WLTX. In 2001, it briefly lost the lead at noon to WLTX, the first time in memory that channel 10 had lost any timeslot. Since then, it has consistently finished second in the noon timeslot behind channel 19 (mainly because of that station's CBS Daytime programming lead-in), and the early morning ratings crown has switched between the two stations multiple times. In 2019, WIS lost the early evening timeslot to WLTX for the first time in memory. While WIS still narrowly led the late news race overall, WLTX had pulled well ahead among adults aged 25–54.

WIS has won numerous awards for station quality and its news productions, including the Southeast Emmy Award for Best Newscast, the Edward R. Murrow Award, and several of the South Carolina Broadcasters Association's "Best Station of the Year" designation. In August 2007, Craig Melvin was named "Anchor of the Year" by SCBA. The station's on-air staff are named in the Best of the Media awards by the Columbia Free Times, and the station has been voted the "Best" by readers of The State newspaper several times.

In 1963, WIS moved its evening newscast from 6 to 7 p.m., in hopes of taking advantage of having The Huntley-Brinkley Report as a lead-in. It was one of only a few stations in the Eastern Time Zone at the time to air a local newscast at 7 p.m. Most of Cosmos/Liberty's other stations followed WIS' lead and moved their early newscasts to 7 p.m. (6 p.m. in the case of Cosmos' stations in the Central Time Zone). It added a 6 p.m. newscast in 1991 as part of increased coverage of the Persian Gulf War. In 1970, WIS-TV premiered Awareness, a weekly public affairs program focusing on social and political issues concerning the minority population of the Midlands. In 1996, WIS entered into a news share agreement with Fox affiliate WACH to produce a 10 p.m. newscast for that station, which—buoyed by WIS's ratings dominance—became one of the highest-rated prime time newscasts in the United States; the agreement ended in March 2007, when WACH launched its own news department.

In 2006, WIS built a new set for its newscasts in preparation to an upgrade to high definition; the new set debuted in January 2007. On November 4, 2010, WIS became the second television station in the Columbia market (after WOLO) to begin broadcasting its local newscasts in high definition. With the upgrade, the set received a refresh and a modified graphics package was introduced; the station also changed its weather branding to "First Alert Weather". On June 16, 2013, WIS expanded its news programming on weekend mornings with the debut of the market's first Sunday morning newscast, airing at 10 a.m.

==== Notable former on-air staff ====
- Susan Audé (Fisher) – anchor (1978–2006)
- Angie Goff
- Craig Melvin

== Subchannels ==
The station's signal is multiplexed:

Subchannels of WIS
Subchannel	Res.	Short name	Programming
10.1	1080i	WIS-NBC	NBC
10.2	720p	WIS-CW	The CW
10.3	480i	Bounce	Bounce TV
10.4	480i	WISPSN	Palmetto Sports & Entertainment Network
10.5	480i	Oxygen	Oxygen
10.6	480i	Outlaw	Outlaw
10.7	480i	The365	365BLK

== See also ==
- List of three-letter broadcast call signs in the United States
