= Cunningham Broadcasting =

American media company

Cunningham Broadcasting Corporation
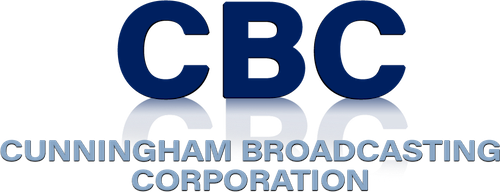
- Formerly: Glencairn, Ltd. (1994–2001)
- Type: Private
- Industry: Broadcast media
- Founded: 1994; 32 years ago Pittsburgh, Pennsylvania, U.S.
- Founder: Edwin Edwards
- Headquarters: Baltimore, Maryland, US
- Owner: Sinclair Broadcast Group
- Website: cunninghambroadcasting.com

Cunningham Broadcasting Corporation is an owner of broadcast television stations in the United States. The company owns fourteen stations–three affiliated with Fox, one affiliated with Catchy Comedy, three affiliated with The CW, one affiliated with ABC, five affiliated with Roar, and one afiliated with Estrella TV.

Cunningham has very close ties to the Sinclair Broadcast Group. All but two of the Cunningham stations are operated by Sinclair under local marketing agreements (the exceptions are WTAT-TV, which Cunningham operates directly with no involvement from Sinclair outside of a news-share agreement with a Sinclair-owned station in its market, and WYZZ-TV, which is operated by Nexstar Media Group). In addition, over 90 percent of Cunningham's stock is controlled by trusts in the name of Sinclair founder Julian Smith's children. Based on these arrangements, Cunningham appears to be a shell corporation which Sinclair uses to circumvent Federal Communications Commission regulations on television station ownership.

== History ==
Cunningham was formed in 1994 as Glencairn, Ltd. It was headed by Edwin Edwards, a former Sinclair executive who had been general manager of one of Sinclair's original stations, WPTT-TV (channel 22, WPNT) in Pittsburgh, Pennsylvania. Sinclair sold WPTT to Edwards after Sinclair bought rival WPGH-TV (channel 53), but continued to operate the station under a local marketing agreement before buying the station back outright in 2000.

The initial capital was supplied by Carolyn Smith, wife of Sinclair founder Julian Smith and mother of current Sinclair CEO David Smith. Carolyn Smith also controlled 70% of Glencairn's stock. However, Glencairn held itself out as a minority-owned broadcaster (Edwards is African American), gaining instant favor with the Federal Communications Commission.

Glencairn's initial purchase set the stage for its future dealings. In late 1993 or early 1994, Sinclair Broadcast Group merged with Abry Communications, which owned WNUV (channel 54) in Baltimore. WNUV had been the principal rival to Sinclair's flagship station, WBFF (channel 45). Sinclair could not keep both stations because FCC rules at the time did not allow common ownership of two television stations in a single market. Accordingly, Glencairn bought WNUV from Sinclair, and the latter took over WNUV's operations under an LMA. However, due to the Smiths' controlling interest in Glencairn, Sinclair effectively had a duopoly in Baltimore – and had all but emasculated its principal rival.

Glencairn eventually bought ten more stations, and Sinclair controlled all their operations via local marketing agreements. Due to Glencairn's financial structure (the Smiths eventually bought 97% of Glencairn's stock), Sinclair effectively had duopolies in all 11 markets in violation of the FCC media ownership rules at the time. Among the more notable purchases:

- As part of the Abry merger, Sinclair also acquired WNRW-TV (channel 45, now WXLV-TV) in Winston-Salem, North Carolina. It simulcast its programming on separately-owned WGGT-TV (channel 48) in Greensboro. Glencairn bought WGGT from its previous owner Act III Broadcasting, discontinued the simulcast and turned WGGT into an affiliate of the fledgling United Paramount Network as WUPN-TV (now MyNetworkTV affiliate WMYV).
- In 1995, Glencairn bought WRDC-TV (channel 28) in Raleigh, North Carolina and turned over control of its operations to Sinclair via an LMA. Sinclair already owned WLFL (channel 22) in that market. In effect, Sinclair now had duopolies in two of North Carolina's largest markets.
- In 1996, Sinclair merged with River City Broadcasting, which owned ABC affiliate WSYX (channel 6) in Columbus, Ohio. This initially posed a problem for Sinclair, as it already owned that market's Fox affiliate, WTTE (channel 28). Sinclair decided to keep the higher-rated WSYX and sold WTTE to Glencairn. Sinclair continued to operate WTTE through an LMA. River City also owned WLOS (channel 13) in Asheville, North Carolina and satellite station WAXA-TV (channel 40) in Anderson, South Carolina. Sinclair sold WAXA to Glencairn, who ended the simulcast and turned WAXA into an independent station, later changing its call letters to WFBC-TV and later WBSC-TV.
- In 1997, Sinclair purchased the broadcasting properties of Heritage Media, which included ABC affiliate WCHS-TV (channel 8) in Charleston, West Virginia. Sinclair already owned the market's Fox affiliate WVAH-TV (channel 11), but opted to keep the longer-established WCHS and sold WVAH to Glencairn. Also that year, Glencairn bought KRRT (channel 35, now KMYS) in San Antonio, Texas, which already had an existing LMA with KABB (channel 29, which Sinclair had acquired the previous year as part of its purchase of River City).
- In 1998, Sinclair and Glencairn teamed up to buy five stations from Sullivan Broadcasting. Glencairn simply bought the licenses while Sinclair bought the stations' other assets. Sinclair then leased the non-license assets back to Glencairn.

=== The 1999–2001 dispute ===
In 1999, the FCC finally relaxed its ownership rules and allowed one company to own two stations in the same market starting in 2001. Ironically, this development brought the Sinclair-Glencairn arrangement to light for the first time. At the time, Glencairn was getting ready to buy Sullivan-owned KOKH-TV (channel 25) in Oklahoma City, Oklahoma, where Sinclair already owned KOCB (channel 34). When the FCC relaxed its rules, Sinclair simply replaced Glencairn as the buyer for KOKH. Glencairn then announced plans to sell five of its stations to Sinclair outright.

The move led Jesse Jackson and others to file challenges to the proposed transactions. In the course of subsequent hearings, it emerged that Edwards did not know how much debt Glencairn would assume when the deals were finalized. This led FCC Commissioner Michael Copps to question the deal's integrity, as well as Glencairn's decision-making process. It later emerged that Glencairn was to be paid for the proposed purchases with Sinclair stock and that the Smiths controlled almost all of Glencairn's stock. Eventually, the FCC placed a $40,000 fine against Sinclair for illegally controlling Glencairn. However, it took no further action, leading Copps to blast the decision as a backhanded endorsement of Sinclair's tactics.

=== Glencairn becomes Cunningham ===
In 2001, Glencairn attempted to merge with Sinclair outright. However, the FCC rejected the deal because six of Glencairn's stations – WNUV, WVAH, WTTE, WBSC, WRGT-TV (channel 45) in Dayton, Ohio and WTAT-TV (channel 24) in Charleston, South Carolina – were located in markets where Sinclair could not legally have duopolies. The reasons stated:

- WNUV: Baltimore has only seven full-power television stations. The FCC requires a market to have eight unique station owners once a duopoly is formed, not counting low-power stations.
- WTTE: Sinclair-owned WSYX is the third-rated station in Columbus while WTTE is the fourth-rated station. FCC rules do not allow common ownership of two of the four highest-rated stations in a single market. In addition, Columbus has only seven full-power stations – too few to allow a duopoly in any case.
- WBSC: The FCC already permitted Media General, owner of WSPA-TV (channel 7), to buy LMA partner WASV (channel 62, now WYCW) in 2002, and a Sinclair purchase of WBSC (now WMYA-TV) would leave only seven unique owners in the Greenville-Spartanburg-Asheville market.
- WVAH: Sinclair-owned WCHS was the second highest-rated station in the Huntington-Charleston market, while WVAH was fourth at the time.
- WRGT: Dayton has only seven full-power television stations – too few to allow any duopolies. In addition, Sinclair already owned WKEF (channel 22), the third highest-rated station, while WRGT is the fourth highest-rated.
- WTAT: Charleston has only six full-power stations – too few to allow any duopolies. WTAT was nominally a junior partner in an LMA with WMMP (channel 36), which Sinclair had acquired in a group deal in July 1998. In 2020, this was resolved when Cunningham began to operate WTAT directly, ending relations with WCIV outside of a news share agreement.

Sinclair, however, was able to buy five of Glencairn's stations, and Glencairn subsequently changed its name to Cunningham Broadcasting, named after the widow of Sinclair's founder, Carolyn Cunningham Smith. However, nearly all of Cunningham's stock is owned by the estate of Carolyn C. Smith, which controls the trusts of her and Julian Sinclair Smith's four sons (one of whom is the chairman of the board of Sinclair and previously its CEO), and so Sinclair still effectively owns Cunningham. This situation led Sinclair Media Watch, a grassroots organization based in Asheville, to file informal objections when WLOS and WBSC's licenses came up for renewal in 2004. However, the FCC has taken no further action against Sinclair or Cunningham.

== Current stations ==
- Stations are arranged in alphabetical order by state and city of license.

Stations owned by Cunningham Broadcasting
Media market	State	Station	Purchased	Network affiliation	Notes
Birmingham	Alabama	WDBB	1995	The CW	(Note: Satellite of WTTO.)
Peoria–Bloomington	Illinois	WYZZ-TV	2013	Fox	(Note: Operated by Nexstar Media Group.)
Baltimore	Maryland	WNUV	1994	The CW	
Bay City–Flint	Michigan	WBSF	2013	The CW	
Elko	Nevada	KENV-DT	2018	Roar	
Reno	Nevada	KRNV-DT	2018	Roar	
Columbus	Ohio	WTTE	1997	Roar	
Dayton	Ohio	WRGT-TV	1997	Roar	
Johnstown–Altoona	Pennsylvania	WATM-TV	2016	ABC	
Johnstown–Altoona	Pennsylvania	WWCP-TV	2016	Fox	
Charleston	South Carolina	WTAT-TV	1995	Fox	(Note: Operated by Cunningham directly.)
Greenville–Spartanburg	South Carolina	WMYA-TV	1997	Roar	
Dallas–Fort Worth	Texas	KTXD-TV	2018	Estrella TV	
Charleston–Huntington	West Virginia	WVAH-TV	1997	Catchy Comedy	

== See also ==
- Deerfield Media
- Duopoly (broadcasting)
- Mission Broadcasting and White Knight Broadcasting—similar holding companies related to Nexstar Media Group
