= WYCW =

Television station in Asheville, North Carolina

- Asheville, North Carolina; Greenville–Spartanburg–; Anderson, South Carolina; United States
- City: Asheville, North Carolina
- Channels: Digital: 11 (VHF), shared with WSPA-TV; Virtual: 62
- Branding: Local 62

Programming
- Affiliations: 62.1: Independent; 62.3: Rewind TV

Ownership
- Owner: Nexstar Media Group; (Nexstar Media Inc.)
- Sister stations: WSPA-TV

History
- First air date: June 1, 1986
- Former call signs: WASV-TV (1984–2006)
- Former channel numbers: Analog: 62 (UHF, 1986–2009); Digital: 45 (UHF, 2002–2018), 7 (VHF, 2018–2020)
- Former affiliations: Independent (1986–1997); The WB (1997–1999); UPN (secondary 1997–1999, primary 1999–2006); The CW (2006–2026)
- Call sign meaning: The CW (former affiliation)

Technical information
- Licensing authority: FCC
- Facility ID: 70149
- ERP: 33.5 kW
- HAAT: 674.2 m (2,212 ft)
- Transmitter coordinates: 35°10′12.4″N 82°17′26.4″W
- Translator(s): see WSPA-TV#Translators

Links
- Public license information: Public file; LMS

WYCW (channel 62), branded as Local 62, is an independent television station licensed to Asheville, North Carolina, United States, serving Western North Carolina and Upstate South Carolina. It is owned by Nexstar Media Group alongside Spartanburg, South Carolina–licensed CW outlet WSPA-TV (channel 7). The two stations share studios on International Drive (next to the I-26 and I-85 Business/Veterans Parkway interchange) in Spartanburg and a transmitter on Hogback Mountain in northeastern Greenville County, South Carolina, southwest of Tryon, North Carolina.

This station began broadcasting in June 1986 as WASV-TV. When it was on the air, it aired religious programming or home shopping. It was off the air between 1991 and 1994 and again from January 1996 to October 1997. WASV-TV was acquired by Pappas Telecasting and, after constructing a new tower in North Carolina, returned to the air in October 1997 as an affiliate of UPN and The WB. WSPA-TV's then-owner, Spartan Communications, programmed WASV-TV under a local marketing agreement with Pappas. The WB affiliation had already been signed for by another local station beginning in 1999, and channel 62 became a sole UPN affiliate. Spartan Communications's successor, Media General, acquired channel 62 outright in January 2002 and launched a 10 p.m. local newscast. When UPN and The WB merged in 2006, WASV-TV became the CW affiliate and changed its call sign to WYCW. Since 2018, WYCW and WSPA have been broadcast from the same transmitter in South Carolina. On August 1, 2026, the CW affiliation moved to WSPA as part of a broader programming shift, making WYCW an independent station.

== Prior use of channel 62 in Asheville ==
Asheville's first television station, WISE-TV, began broadcasting on channel 62 on August 2, 1953. It was a primary NBC affiliate which also carried programs from ABC, CBS, and DuMont. ABC and DuMont moved to WLOS (channel 13) when that station signed on in September 1954. In 1967, the station changed its call letters to WANC; the next year, it dropped its remaining NBC programming as its ownership brought a cable system to Asheville. WANC-TV moved from channel 62 to 21 in 1971 and aired a limited amount of Christian television programming throughout the 1970s by simulcasting WGGS-TV (channel 16) in Greenville. The station went silent in 1979 when the lease on its tower site expired; Pappas Telecasting acquired WANC-TV and returned it to the air as WHNS on April 1, 1984.

After WANC-TV moved to channel 21, WSPA-TV (channel 7) opened a translator using the channel in 1973. It broadcast from White Fawn Reservoir to provide the WSPA-TV signal in areas of southeast Asheville.

== History ==
=== Construction and early years ===
Channel 62 remained allocated for a full-service station, and in March 1983, Local Majority TV applied to the Federal Communications Commission (FCC) for a construction permit to use the channel. The firm was owned by Millard V. Oakley, who owned radio stations and a cable television system in Tennessee. In 1985, the commission authorized the station to broadcast with an effective radiated power of 8,400 watts. An application for a license to cover was filed on October 15, 1985, indicating that the station, with the call sign WASV-TV, had been completed. The Television & Cable Factbook lists that WASV-TV began broadcasting on June 1, 1986. In September, when he was interviewed by the Durham Morning Herald, Oakley stated that the station was operating "on a limited basis", as he had not put together programming yet, but he intended to broadcast religious programs.

Later that year, Oakley filed to sell WASV-TV to Dove Broadcasting, the owner of WGGS-TV; at the time, Broadcasting listed the construction permit as unbuilt for a much higher effective radiated power of 1,995,300 watts. Dove intended for channel 62 to simulcast WGGS-TV in Greenville to viewers who could not receive the main station's signal in the region's rugged terrain. In July 1988, Oakley instead filed to sell WASV-TV to Video Marketing Network, a firm headed by Robert J. Murley. Video Marketing Network, based in Sarasota, Florida, intended to launch a series of low-power television stations carrying the company's own home shopping programming. However, by May 1988, the firm was focused on test marketing its programming, not on station construction. Between 1991 and 1994, according to the Television & Cable Factbook, WASV-TV was off the air due to what are listed as "financial and technical difficulties"; the station was advertised as for sale and "liquidation priced" in a 1991 issue of Broadcasting. It resumed service, operating as a rebroadcaster of WGGS-TV, only for its tower to collapse on January 17, 1996.

=== WB and UPN affiliation ===
During this time, in March 1994, Video Marketing Network filed to sell WASV-TV to Pappas Telecasting. This marked a return to Asheville for Pappas, who had been responsible for the rebuild of WHNS. President Harry Pappas proposed to affiliate WASV-TV with The WB and launch a news department. Though Pappas now had the license, it needed a tower. It proposed to build one in southern Transylvania County, where it met opposition from locals opposed to a tower altering the area's scenic landscape. The county declared a 180-day moratorium on tower construction in response, and an alternate site on Pinnacle Mountain in Henderson County was secured. Pappas also contracted with WSPA-TV owner Spartan Communications to provide programming, including daily newscasts, under a local marketing agreement (LMA).

The relaunched WASV was made available to cable subscribers in Greenville and Spartanburg on September 8, 1997. It began broadcasting from its new tower on October 5 and at that time became an affiliate of UPN. In addition to UPN and WB programming, the station aired syndicated programming but had no local newscast. When WASV signed with UPN, it was announced that the station would eventually become a sole affiliate of that network. This was because The WB had already signed to move its station to the Sinclair Broadcast Group–associated WFBC-TV (channel 40). This came to pass on September 6, 1999, when WB programs moved and that station became WBSC.

On December 8, 1999, Spartan Communications agreed to be purchased by Media General for $605 million. The transaction bolstered Media General's portfolio of Southeastern TV stations while marking the end of a local, family-owned broadcaster. Media General was permitted to buy WASV-TV outright in 2002, even though under FCC rules of the time the market had too few stations to permit duopolies.

Logo used as WASV from September 2002 to September 2006.

The WB and UPN merged in 2006 to form The CW. Sinclair decided to affiliate WBSC with MyNetworkTV, a new service formed by the News Corporation, which was also owner of the Fox network. The CW announced an affiliation agreement with WASV on March 28, 2006. Ahead of the launch of the new network, WASV changed call signs to WYCW.

On March 1, 2009, WSPA's digital tower on Hogback Mountain collapsed in a wind storm, taking down the tower used for analog broadcasting—dating to the 1970s—as it fell. WSPA's digital signal was restored as a subchannel of WYCW, and a replacement antenna was mounted on the remnant lower portion of the digital tower to broadcast a temporary analog and digital service until a replacement tower was constructed.

On September 8, 2015, Media General announced that it would acquire the Meredith Corporation, then-owner of regional Fox affiliate WHNS (channel 21), for $2.4 billion to form Meredith Media General. With WSPA and WHNS among the four highest-rated stations in the market, one of WSPA or WHNS would have had to be divested had the deal gone through. That sale was canceled on January 27, 2016, in favor of a sale of Media General to the Nexstar Broadcasting Group that was completed in January 2017. Nexstar acquired the CW network in 2022.

Sister station WSPA-TV lost its CBS affiliation to WYFF on August 1, 2026, as part of a modified renewal of most other Nexstar affiliations with CBS. Greenville–Spartanburg–Asheville was one of four markets where stations owned by Hearst Television assumed the CBS affiliation from Nexstar-owned stations in their markets. In turn, WSPA began airing CW programming at that time, moving the affiliation from WYCW.

== Newscasts ==
After buying WASV-TV outright, Media General moved to establish a news presence on channel 62. On March 4, 2002, WSPA-TV began producing The News on 62, a 10 p.m. half-hour newscast with regional news and weather. A morning news extension from 7 to 9 a.m. was later added. In 2022, the 10 p.m. news was extended to a full hour.

== Technical information ==
What was then WASV-TV began airing a digital signal on channel 45 on March 8, 2002. The digital signal remained on channel 45 when the station shut down its analog signal on February 17, 2009, the original digital transition date. In 2017, Nexstar sold WYCW's spectrum in exchange for $45.6 million as part of the spectrum auction, with the two stations beginning to broadcast from the same transmitter site in 2018.

=== Subchannels ===
The WSPA-TV/WYCW transmitter is on Hogback Mountain in northeastern Greenville County, South Carolina.

Subchannels of WSPA-TV and WYCW
License	Subchannel	Res.	Short name	Programming
WSPA-TV	7.1	1080i	WSPA-HD	The CW
WSPA-TV	7.3	480i	ION	Ion
WSPA-TV	40.2	480i	Charge!	Charge! (WMYA-TV)
WYCW	62.1	1080i	WYCW-HD	Main WYCW programming
WYCW	62.3	480i	REWIND	Rewind TV

Broadcast on behalf of another station

=== Translators ===
WSPA-TV–WYCW's signal is additionally rebroadcast over the following translators, mostly in North Carolina:

- Cherokee, North Carolina: W08AT-D
- Spruce Pine, North Carolina: W08BF-D
- Sylva, North Carolina: W09AF-D
- Franklin, North Carolina: W09AG-D
- Montreat, North Carolina: W10AD-D
- Greenville, South Carolina: W10AJ-D
- Bryson City, North Carolina: W11AN-D
- Mars Hill, North Carolina: W15EL-D
- Weaverville, North Carolina: W18EP-D
- Marshall, North Carolina: W23ES-D
- Canton, North Carolina: W23EY-D
- Brevard, North Carolina: W32FI-D
- Beaver Dam, North Carolina: W35DT-D
