= WANC-TV =

Television station in Asheville, North Carolina, United States

WANC-TV (WISE-TV)
- Asheville, North Carolina; United States
- Channels: Analog: 21 (UHF)

Programming
- Affiliations: Primary: NBC (1953–1968), Independent (1968–1979); Secondary: ABC (1953–1954), CBS (1953–1964)

Ownership
- Owner: Thoms Broadcasting; (WISE-TV, Incorporated)

History
- First air date: August 2, 1953
- Last air date: 1979
- Former call signs: WISE-TV (1953–1967)
- Former channel numbers: 62 (UHF, 1953–1971)

Technical information
- ERP: 17.2 kW
- HAAT: 423 ft (129 m)
- Transmitter coordinates: 35°36′33.5″N 82°32′11.8″W

WANC-TV (known as WISE-TV from 1953 to 1967) was a television station in Asheville, North Carolina, United States. It broadcast on channel 62 from 1953 to 1971 and channel 21 from 1971 to 1979. Owned throughout its existence by Thoms Broadcasting, WANC-TV was originally a network affiliate, though it gradually lost all of its affiliations. For most of the 1970s, it operated as a Christian independent station by rebroadcasting some programs of WGGS-TV (channel 16) in Greenville, South Carolina. Facing financial difficulty and the loss of its transmitter site, the station shut down in 1979. The channel 21 license was sold to Pappas Telecasting, which began the lengthy reconstruction of the station as WHNS, a general-market independent station which launched in 1984.

== History ==
=== Early years as WISE-TV ===
The Federal Communications Commission (FCC) granted radio station WISE (1310 AM) a construction permit for a new television station to broadcast on channel 62 in Asheville on October 29, 1952. WISE was owned by Harold Thoms alongside stations in Charlotte (WAYS), Greensboro (WCOG), and Durham (WSSB); it was the only applicant for channel 62, whereas VHF channel 13 was being fought for by radio stations WLOS and WSKY. The station plans were almost abandoned amid the first proposals to build a cable television system to import signals from Charlotte, which Thoms charged would have made his proposed channel 62 unviable.

WISE-TV began telecasting on August 2, 1953, as Asheville's first television station. Channel 62 aired programming (on kinescope) from all networks, but reflecting the association of WISE radio with NBC, it was a primary affiliate of that network. The original studio facilities were on land leased from Asheville-Biltmore College, which received two hours a week in air time for educational programming; the channel 62 transmitter was located on Beaucatcher Mountain.

Competition arrived the next year when WLOS-TV, operating on VHF channel 13, started up; the new station assumed the ABC and DuMont affiliations. WISE-TV attempted to get a VHF channel to improve its competitive position, proposing to operate on channel 2 instead of 62. The station in its initial years on air operated under special temporary authority at just 1,000 watts. It would not be until December 1957 that channel 62 broadcast at its intended effective radiated power of 24,000 watts.

In 1964, Spartanburg CBS affiliate WSPA-TV improved its service to Asheville by building a translator on channel 72 at White Fawn Reservoir, which provided a stronger signal and reached homes shaded from its main transmitter at Hogback Mountain. During the application process, it was noted that WISE-TV aired little more than NBC network shows and "extremely limited" live programming.

In 1966, the station received a construction permit to move from channel 62 to channel 21. WISE-TV became WANC-TV on February 3, 1967.

=== Cable comes to Asheville ===
Thoms expressed his interest in obtaining a cable television franchise for the Asheville area throughout the mid-1960s, being the first to file for the rights in 1964 and challenging city council decisions that would have granted the franchise to other applicants. Thoms backed a successful referendum to win the franchise in July 1967. When the system finally launched in 1968, it brought signals from NBC affiliates WFBC-TV in Greenville, South Carolina, and WCYB-TV in Bristol, Tennessee. At that time, WANC-TV disaffiliated from NBC. It was one of the last stations in a top-100 media market to not have color video tape equipment.

It would not be until 1971 that channel 62 finally went silent to complete the conversion to channel 21, five years after receiving the original permit.

=== The Christian years ===
In 1974, the station began to air programs from the Christian Broadcasting Network in prime time hours. It also aired some programming from Christian independent station WGGS-TV in Greenville, including its local "Nightline" program. A 1976 profile of WGGS-TV described channel 21 as rebroadcasting it in the evenings, while the station was described as a satellite of the Greenville outlet in 1977.

In June 1977, Thoms filed to sell WANC-TV to Carolina Christian Broadcasting, owner of WGGS-TV, for $60,000. The FCC opted to designate a hearing on the matter; it found that the sale of WANC-TV to Carolina Christian would be an inefficient use of spectrum, as there were available sites for WGGS-TV to relocate and begin covering Asheville. CCB opted to drop its bid to purchase the station and pursue other avenues of serving Asheville.

=== Sale to Pappas Telecasting ===
After the sale to Carolina Christian Broadcasting collapsed, Thoms lost its lease on the channel 21 transmitter site, forcing the station to go off the air. It then reached a deal to sell WANC-TV to Pappas Telecasting of Visalia, California, for $206,000 in June 1979. The sale became effective September 14, and twelve days later, on September 26, the call letters were changed to WHNS. Pappas embarked on a multi-year project to build a new channel 21 transmitter atop Slick Rock Mountain in Transylvania County, accompanied by a primary base in Greenville and studios in Asheville. After years of delays related to the transmitter change, channel 21 returned to the region April 1, 1984.
