= WFBC-TV =

The call sign WFBC-TV could refer to one of two television stations in South Carolina:

- WYFF, a television station broadcasting on channel 36 digital/4 PSIP, licensed to Greenville, which held the call sign WFBC-TV from 1953 to 1983.
- WMYA-TV, a television station broadcasting on channel 35 digital/40 PSIP, licensed to Anderson, which held the call sign WFBC-TV from 1995 to 1999.
