= WGGS-TV =

Television station in Greenville, South Carolina

- Greenville–Spartanburg–; Anderson, South Carolina; Asheville, North Carolina; United States
- City: Greenville, South Carolina
- Channels: Digital: 29 (UHF); Virtual: 16
- Branding: WGGS-TV 16

Programming
- Affiliations: 16.1: Religious Independent; for others, see § Subchannels

Ownership
- Owner: Carolina Christian Broadcasting, Inc.
- Sister stations: WWYA-LD

History
- First air date: October 29, 1972
- Former channel numbers: Analog: 16 (UHF, 1972–2009); Digital: 35 (UHF, 2000–2009), 16 (UHF, 2009–2019), 2 (VHF, 2019–2024)
- Call sign meaning: "We're Greenville's Gospel Station"

Technical information
- Licensing authority: FCC
- Facility ID: 9064
- ERP: 125 kW
- HAAT: 354 m (1,161 ft)
- Transmitter coordinates: 34°56′26.4″N 82°24′40.4″W

Links
- Public license information: Public file; LMS
- Website: wggs16.com

WGGS-TV (channel 16) is a religious independent television station licensed to Greenville, South Carolina, United States, serving Upstate South Carolina and Western North Carolina. Owned by Carolina Christian Broadcasting, it is sister to Honea Path–licensed low-power Movies! affiliate WWYA-LD (channel 28). The two stations share studios on Rutherford Road in Taylors, South Carolina; WGGS-TV's transmitter is located at Paris Mountain State Park (just outside Greenville).

== History ==
The station first signed on the air on October 29, 1972. It is the oldest independent station in the state of South Carolina, and was also the first new commercial station to sign on in the Greenville–Spartanburg–Asheville market since CBS affiliate WSPA-TV (channel 7) signed on in April 1956. Carolina Christian Broadcasting has owned the station for its entire existence.

The station initially ran a mixture of secular general entertainment programming for half the broadcast day (which over the years had mainly featured classic series such as The Lone Ranger, The Adventures of Ozzie and Harriet, The Brady Bunch, Dennis the Menace, The Donna Reed Show, Leave It to Beaver, Father Knows Best and Rawhide, as well as Little Rascals, Looney Tunes/Merrie Melodies and Popeye shorts) and Christian-related religious programming for the other half. It aired a larger amount of secular programming on Saturdays, and exclusively carried religious programs on Sundays. The station's programming policy, then as now, was very conservative in regards to content so as not to offend the sensibilities of its mostly fundamentalist and Pentecostal viewership.

WGGS came under fire for allegedly using a copyrighted name for one of its locally produced programs after ABC premiered the newsmagazine Nightline in 1980; this was despite the fact that the program used the title Niteline long before Nightline's existence. Some of WGGS' other local productions at the time included the exercise program Beverly Exercise; a talk show hosted by Peggy Denny and the children's program Drick's Follies (running during the 1980s and 1990s), which featured public domain cartoon shorts from the 1930s to the 1950s.

In the early 1980s, Carolina Christian Broadcasting signed on two more stations: WCCT (now WACH) in Columbia and WGSE (now WFXB) in Myrtle Beach. WCCT produced its own version of Niteline once a week, and aired WGGS' version during the rest of the week. WCCT and WGSE aired far more cartoons, barter talk and game shows, and sitcoms than WGGS did, with Christian programming comprising only about a third of the schedules of both. Both stations were later sold off to secular interests (both WACH and WFXB are now affiliates of Fox; WACH is now owned by the Sinclair Broadcast Group and WFXB is now owned by Bahakel Communications).

WGGS was the only independent station in the western Carolinas until the winter of 1979, when WAIM-TV (channel 40, now MyNetworkTV affiliate WMYA-TV) lost its secondary ABC affiliation and reformatted itself as independent station WAXA. WGGS began to phase out secular programs from its lineup in 1982, a process that sped up when WHNS (channel 21, now a Fox affiliate) signed on in April 1984. By 1986, the station almost entirely ran Christian-oriented religious programs. WGGS did acquire some additional secular cartoons and barter sitcoms to air during the late afternoons from 3 to 6 p.m. in the early 1990s, but by 1999, the station was back to airing a schedule almost entirely made up of religious programming. The station also turned down an offer by Paxson Communications to affiliate with Pax TV in 1998. The station originally signed off on a nightly basis until the early 1990s, when it reduced its off-hours to late Sunday night/early Monday mornings; channel 16 began broadcasting on a 24-hour schedule in late 1999.

Even after the digital television transition, WGGS' transmitter only provides grade B signal coverage to the North Carolina portion of the market. From the late 1970s until 1984, WGGS operated a low-power translator in Asheville on UHF channel 21. This was necessary in the days before there was significant cable penetration in the Greenville–Spartanburg–Asheville market. When this translator was displaced by WHNS when it signed on in 1984, WGGS reached a deal with the owners of WASV-TV (channel 62, now WYCW) in Asheville, to operate it as a full-power satellite until it was sold in 1995 to former WHNS owner Pappas Telecasting Companies.

WGGS-TV discontinued regular programming on its analog signal, over UHF channel 16, on June 12, 2009, the official date on which full-power television stations in the United States transitioned from analog to digital broadcasts under federal mandate. The station's digital signal relocated from its pre-transition UHF channel 35 to channel 16.

On April 13, 2017, the FCC announced that WGGS participated in the 2016–17 spectrum reallocation auction and will be compensated $44.3 million to move its signal to the Low-VHF band. On September 6, 2019, WGGS transitioned from channel 16 to channel 2. In September 2023, WGGS petitioned the FCC for a move to UHF channel 29, citing reception issues and viewer complaints in its immediate broadcast area since the move to VHF 2. The petition was granted on March 4, 2024, and the move was completed on November 2.

== Programming ==
The station's schedule almost entirely consists of Christian programming. WGGS airs many shows hosted by televangelists, such as Jim Bakker, Benny Hinn, Kenneth Copeland, James Robison and Joyce Meyer as well as shows such as The 700 Club, In Touch with Dr. Charles Stanley and some locally produced programming such as the local Christian talk/variety show Niteline.

Tammy Faye Messner, the ex-wife of former PTL and Heritage USA founder Jim Bakker, announced plans for a cooking show called You Can Make It! which began airing in May 2006 (Messner died of cancer in July 2007, but the show continued production with a different host). The few secular programs on the station include infomercials, wildlife sporting programs, family-oriented public domain television series (such as The Cisco Kid, Scaly Adventures, and The Adventures of Ozzie and Harriet), and home improvement, health and fitness programs (such as P. Allen Smith Garden Style). The station also airs some Christian-oriented children's programming as well as a few programs (such as Praise the Lord) sourced from the Trinity Broadcasting Network—which does not have a full-time affiliate nor an owned-and-operated station in the Greenville–Spartanburg–Asheville market (however, the network's national feed is carried on Charter Spectrum and select other cable providers). Like many religious independents of its format, WGGS does not carry secular programming on Sundays, opting to air bible instruction shows, local church services and televangelist programs.

== Subchannels ==
The station's signal is multiplexed:

Subchannels of WGGS-TV
Subchannel	Res.	Short name	Programming
16.1	1080i	WGGS-HD	Main WGGS-TV programming
16.2	480i	OUTLAW	Outlaw
16.3	480i	SBN	SonLife
16.4	480i	IONPLUS	Ion Plus
16.5	480i	STARTTV	Start TV
16.6	480i	LAFF	Laff
16.7	480i	COURT	Court TV
16.8	480i	BUSTED	Busted (4:3)
16.9	480i	QVC	QVC
16.10	480i	DEFY	Defy (4:3)
16.11	480i	Walk	The Walk TV

== See also ==
- WATC – sister station in Atlanta
- KMCT-TV – sister station in Monroe, Louisiana
