= WACH =

Television station in Columbia, South Carolina

- Columbia, South Carolina; United States
- Channels: Digital: 22 (UHF); Virtual: 57
- Branding: WACH Fox 57; WACH Fox News (spoken as "Watch Fox")

Programming
- Affiliations: 57.1: Fox; for others, see § Subchannels

Ownership
- Owner: Sinclair Broadcast Group; (WACH Licensee, LLC)

History
- Founded: September 8, 1980
- First air date: September 1, 1981
- Former call signs: WCCT-TV (1981–1988)
- Former channel numbers: Analog: 57 (UHF, 1981–2009); Digital: 48 (UHF, until 2019)
- Former affiliations: Independent (1981–1988)
- Call sign meaning: "Watch"

Technical information
- Licensing authority: FCC
- Facility ID: 19199
- ERP: 460 kW
- HAAT: 464 m (1,522 ft)
- Transmitter coordinates: 34°6′58.4″N 80°45′49.9″W

Links
- Public license information: Public file; LMS
- Website: wach.com

WACH (channel 57) is a television station in Columbia, South Carolina, United States, affiliated with the Fox network. Owned by Sinclair Broadcast Group, the station maintains studios on Pickens Street in downtown Columbia, and its transmitter is located on Rush Road (southeast of I-20), in rural southwestern Kershaw County.

== History ==
=== WCCT-TV ===
After several false starts dating back to 1980, the station first signed on the air on September 1, 1981, as WCCT-TV (for Carolina Christian Television), Columbia's first independent station. It was founded by Carolina Christian Broadcasting, which also owned WGGS-TV (channel 16) in Greenville.

The station's original studios were located on Sunset Boulevard (US 378) in West Columbia. Initially, it ran religious programming for most of the broadcast day, such as The 700 Club and The PTL Club, and televangelist programs from Richard Roberts and Jimmy Swaggart. It also carried WGGS's locally produced Christian program, Niteline. WCCT eventually began producing its own local version of the show. The rest of the day was taken up by secular syndicated programming, including cartoons, classic sitcoms, westerns, and hunting and sports programs. However, its programming policy was very conservative so as not to offend the sensibilities of its mostly fundamentalist and Pentecostal viewership. Notably, it refused to run any programming that contained profanity, violence or sexual content.

=== As a Fox affiliate ===
On June 11, 1988, the station was sold to FCVS Communications. On the day FCVS closed on its purchase of channel 57, it changed the call letters to WACH (the WCCT-TV calls are presently used by a CW-affiliated station in Waterbury, Connecticut, serving the Hartford–New Haven market) and relaunched it as the market's Fox affiliate, branding as "WACH-TV 57". For the first two years of Fox's existence, Columbia residents were only able to see the network's programming via its Washington, D.C., owned-and-operated station WTTG, which had been available on area cable systems for many years. That station continued to be available on Columbia's two major cable providers, Wometco and TCI, for several years afterward.

FCVS significantly upgraded the station's programming, adding somewhat racier programming to the schedule. At first, WACH kept Christian-oriented religious programming on weekdays from 9 a.m. to noon and from midnight to 2 a.m. per an agreement with Carolina Christian Broadcasting. It also agreed to continue producing and airing Niteline for an hour a day for five years. The program was dropped from the schedule by 1993, along with most of the religious programs. WACH eventually changed its branding to "WACH Fox 57" in the 1990s.

=== Ownership changes ===
FCVS eventually bought two other stations, WKCH-TV (now WTNZ) in Knoxville, Tennessee, and WEVU-TV (now WZVN-TV) in Naples, Florida. FCVS sold its entire television division to Ellis Communications in 1993. Ellis merged with Aflac's broadcasting division to form Raycom Media in 1996. Raycom merged with The Liberty Corporation, owner of NBC affiliate WIS (channel 10), in 2005.

Raycom could not keep both stations because the Federal Communications Commission's duopoly rules at the time prohibited the common ownership of two of the four highest-rated television stations in a single market. Additionally, Columbia has only eight full-power stations, too few to permit a duopoly in any case. The FCC requires a market to have eight unique station owners once a duopoly is formed. Ultimately, Raycom opted to keep long-dominant WIS and put WACH on the market. On March 27, 2006, Raycom announced it would sell WACH and 11 other stations to Barrington Broadcasting. The transaction was completed on August 11, 2006.

On February 28, 2013, Barrington Broadcasting announced it would merge with the Sinclair Broadcast Group in a $370 million deal. The sale was completed on November 25.

== News operation ==
WACH presently broadcasts 11 hours of locally produced newscasts each week (with two hours each weekday and a half-hour each on Saturdays and Sundays); WACH is one of the largest Fox affiliates in the country whose prime time newscast does not air for one hour seven days a week (the Saturday and Sunday editions currently run for 30 minutes).

In 1996, NBC affiliate WIS entered into a news share agreement to produce a prime time newscast at 10 p.m. for WACH, the first such prime time newscast in the Columbia market and one of the first in South Carolina. For many years, it was one of the highest-rated prime time newscasts in the nation. Under Barrington Broadcasting ownership, the station terminated its news agreement with WIS and established its own in-house news department at its facilities on Pickens Street; WACH assumed production responsibilities for the prime time newscast on March 4, 2007. One month later on April 23, 2007, WACH debuted a three-hour weekday morning newscast from 6 to 9 a.m. titled WACH Fox News Good Day (which was renamed Good Day Columbia in April 2010). In March 2007, longtime 10 p.m. co-anchor and managing editor Mike Woolfolk was inducted into the Hall of Fame by Region III of the National Association of Black Journalists.

On September 28, 2009, WACH became the first television station in the Columbia market to begin broadcasting its local newscasts in 16:9 widescreen standard definition, alongside the introduction of a new graphics package. Video from within the main studio, field cameras and other station camera feeds are upconverted to a 16:9 widescreen format in the control room. On November 9, 2009, the station debuted a half-hour early evening newscast at 7:30 p.m. weeknights called the WACH Fox Report, which maintained an entertainment-focused format.

In April 2010, WACH introduced a new set and overhauled the graphics for its newscasts; former anchor Arielle Riposta also returned to the station as weeknight co-anchor of the 10 p.m. newscast. Woolfolk left WACH in February 2010, with Darryl Hood replacing him as co-anchor of the 10 p.m. newscast. In the summer of 2010, Good Day Columbia expanded to four hours with the addition of one hour to the broadcast from 5 to 6 a.m. The WACH Fox Report was concurrently moved to 6:30 p.m. and became a more traditional newscast helmed by 10 p.m. anchors Darryl Hood and Katie Williams. On July 7, 2011, the station became the fourth and last television station in the Columbia market (and the first Barrington-owned station) to begin broadcasting its local newscasts in high definition; a new graphics package was phased in over within days of the upgrade. On September 19, 2011, WACH canceled its 6:30 p.m. newscast, replacing it with syndicated programming. Sinclair's graphics were fully implemented throughout all of WACH's newscasts in October 2015, providing a unified brand and music to the station since the broadcasting group's acquisition.

On March 5, 2018, WACH debuted a half-hour 5 p.m. newscast titled Fastcast @ 5, anchored by former WYFF weekend morning anchor Myra Ruiz. This newscast competes with the longer-established hour-long newscasts on WIS and WLTX.

On April 3, 2023, WACH replaced Good Day Columbia with a reairing of the 10 p.m. newscast followed by The National Desk, Sinclair's national news program. While local inserts are prepared for the national broadcast, the station no longer has a live morning news program. The station retained the 5 and 10 p.m. newscasts but made some personnel changes resulting in layoffs.

== Technical information ==
=== Subchannels ===
The station's signal is multiplexed:

Subchannels of WACH
Subchannel	Res.	Short name	Programming
57.1	720p	FOX	Fox
57.2	480i	ROAR	Roar
57.3	480i	CHARGE!	Charge!
57.4	480i	Comet	Comet (4:3)
57.5	480i	TheNest	The Nest (4:3)

=== Analog-to-digital conversion ===
WACH's broadcasts became digital-only, effective June 12, 2009.
