= WHNS =

Television station in Greenville, South Carolina

- Greenville–Spartanburg–; Anderson, South Carolina; Asheville, North Carolina; United States
- City: Greenville, South Carolina (Note: Originally licensed to Asheville, North Carolina; moved to Greenville, South Carolina, in 2003)
- Channels: Digital: 17 (UHF); Virtual: 21
- Branding: Fox Carolina

Programming
- Affiliations: 21.1: Fox; for others, see § Subchannels

Ownership
- Owner: Gray Media; (Gray Television Licensee, LLC)
- Sister stations: WDKT-LD (Telemundo)

History
- Founded: August 2, 1953 (WISE-TV license)
- First air date: April 1, 1984
- Former channel numbers: Analog: 21 (UHF, 1984–2009); Digital: 57 (UHF, 2000–2009), 21 (UHF, 2009–2019)
- Former affiliations: Independent (1984–1988); UPN (secondary, 1995–1997); Pax TV (secondary, 1998–2003)
- Call sign meaning: Harry 'n Stella (Pappas) (original owners)

Technical information
- Licensing authority: FCC
- Facility ID: 72300
- ERP: 364 kW
- HAAT: 759 m (2,490 ft)
- Transmitter coordinates: 35°10′56″N 82°40′55″W
- Translator(s): see § Translators

Links
- Public license information: Public file; LMS
- Website: www.foxcarolina.com

WHNS (channel 21), branded as Fox Carolina, is a television station licensed to Greenville, South Carolina, United States, serving as the Fox affiliate for Upstate South Carolina and Western North Carolina. It is owned by Gray Media and has studios on Interstate Court (just northwest of Interstate 85) in Greenville; its transmitter is located atop Slick Rock Mountain in Transylvania County, North Carolina (5 miles [8 km] southeast of Brevard).

Though the broadcast license on which this station operates dates to 1953, its modern on-air history begins April 1, 1984. What had been WANC-TV in Asheville, North Carolina, which had been broadcasting a limited amount of Christian programming, was bought by Pappas Telecasting and, after several regulatory delays, became the area's first full-market independent station. Though the city of license was Asheville until 2003, the station has always been based in South Carolina. It became a Fox affiliate in 1988.

After debuting its first local newscast in 1996, WHNS established its own news department in 1999 under Meredith Corporation ownership. Starting with a 10 p.m. newscast, WHNS grew to produce morning, early and late evening newscasts. Gray acquired WHNS as part of its purchase of Meredith's broadcasting portfolio in 2021.

== History ==
=== Channel 21 license prior to 1979 ===
WHNS operates on the oldest active television station license in the market, though the connection is indirect. WISE-TV launched in Asheville, North Carolina, on August 2, 1953. Broadcasting on channel 62, it was a primary NBC affiliate which also carried programs from ABC, CBS, and DuMont. ABC and DuMont moved to WLOS (channel 13) when that station signed on in September 1954. In 1967, the station changed its call letters to WANC-TV; the next year, it dropped its remaining NBC programming as its ownership brought a cable system to Asheville. WANC-TV moved from channel 62 to 21 in 1971, airing a limited amount of Christian television programming throughout the 1970s by simulcasting WGGS-TV in Greenville, South Carolina. The owner of WANC-TV, Thoms Broadcasting, reached a deal to sell WANC-TV to the owners of WGGS-TV in 1977; the Federal Communications Commission (FCC) forced the deal's demise in January 1979, saying that, as WGGS-TV could move to a transmitter site from which it could also serve Asheville, the ownership of two stations would be a wasteful use of spectrum.

=== Rebuilding channel 21 and Pappas ownership ===
After the sale to Carolina Christian Broadcasting collapsed, Thoms lost the lease on the channel 21 antenna site, and the station went off the air. Thoms reached a deal to sell WANC-TV to Pappas Telecasting of Visalia, California, for $206,000 in June 1979. The sale became effective September 14, and twelve days later, on September 26, the call sign was changed to WHNS. Pappas announced in August 1980 that it intended to have WHNS on the air by October 1981 as a general-market independent station for Asheville as well as Greenville and Spartanburg. The previous WANC-TV facility on Town Mountain produced a signal that only reached Asheville and did not extend beyond the South Carolina state line. As a result, Pappas filed within a month of taking possession of the license to move the transmitter to Slick Rock Mountain. However, in 1981, the FCC designated its application for hearing. WGGS-TV had filed to move its transmitter to Caesar's Head in Greenville County, South Carolina, and the two applications were mutually exclusive for technical reasons. While WGGS-TV dropped its conflicting application, another problem had emerged: the proposed facility would not provide a strong enough signal to three percent of the city of Asheville, the city of license, because of shadowing by mountains. As a result, the FCC denied the initial application in 1982. Pappas appealed: the FCC review board found in Pappas's favor given the circumstances, finding that the company's push to restore channel 21's service to Asheville, limited choice of suitable sites, and good faith efforts outweighed the shadowing issues.

With approval from the FCC in hand, Pappas set out to rebuild the station. An existing building near Interstate 85 and Pelham Road, midway between Greenville and Spartanburg, was refitted to serve as the main WHNS studio base. Competitor WAXA-TV (channel 40) in Anderson charged Pappas with not meeting its commitments to its city of license, though the construction of local facilities there had been delayed due to site work and sale negotiations. WHNS began broadcasting on April 1, 1984, promoting itself as the market's first general-entertainment independent station. Its program lineup—determined in part from more than 22,000 comments received from viewers—included cartoons, classic TV series, and movies. (WAXA-TV, in comparison, did not reach homes in the North Carolina portion of the market.) It used one of the first circularly polarized TV antennas in service, broadcasting 3.5 million watts of power from Slick Rock Mountain. The station represented a $12 million investment in facilities and another $5 million in programs.

In October 1986, the startup Fox network launched and affiliated with WAXA-TV. That station, though on paper it competed with WHNS, had little to no broadcast signal in the North Carolina portion of the market and only appeared on Asheville cable television systems upon affiliation. WAXA filed for Chapter 11 bankruptcy reorganization in 1988. That same year, Pappas signed Fox affiliation agreements for three stations: WHNS; KMPH-TV serving Fresno, California; and KPTM in Omaha, Nebraska. WAXA left the air a year later.

=== Cannell and First Media ownership ===
Pappas agreed in 1989 to sell WHNS to Cannell Communications, a new broadcast group owned by television producer Stephen J. Cannell; the transaction closed in October 1990. It marked Cannell's first acquisition; company president William A. Schwartz noted that WHNS's status as the only conventional independent station (Note: Fox affiliates continued to be considered independent stations for a number of years after Fox launched, particularly as Fox did not program a full seven-night schedule early on. The Fox owned-and-operated stations did not leave the trade association for independent stations, INTV, until 1992.) made channel 21 an attractive purchase. By the time of the Cannell sale, WHNS had come to be recognized as a significant player in the local TV market.

Cannell opted to exit the business of owning TV stations in 1994 and sold WHNS and KPDX in the Portland, Oregon, market to First Media Television as part of a multi-market, $96 million transaction. The station became a secondary affiliate of UPN when it launched in January 1995; the station had committed to what became UPN under Cannell, a situation that prompted Fox to send a memo discouraging other stations from following suit. The network believed the airing of another network's shows on Fox affiliates diluted Fox's brand. UPN programming moved in 1997 to a new local station, WASV-TV (channel 62).

=== Meredith and Gray ownership ===
First Media sold its stations to the Meredith Corporation for $435 million in 1997. The station rebranded from Fox 21 to Fox Carolina in 2002, citing the wide proliferation of cable and satellite systems that put WHNS on channels other than 21. On July 24, 2003, Meredith received FCC approval to change WHNS's city of license from Asheville to Greenville to aid identification as a South Carolina station. It argued that Greenville was more populous than Asheville and that WHNS's advertisers predominantly came from South Carolina. Under the terms of the reallotment, the station was required to retain city-grade coverage of Asheville and to maintain its existing public interest obligations to that city.

In 2015, Meredith attempted to merge with Media General, owner of WSPA-TV (channel 7) and WYCW (the former WASV); however, that sale was canceled on January 27, 2016, in favor of a sale of Media General to the Nexstar Broadcasting Group. Meredith's broadcasting division was instead acquired in 2021 by Gray Television.

== News operation ==
First Media began discussions with WSPA-TV, the CBS affiliate in Spartanburg, to produce a local newscast for WHNS, which was announced in February 1996 and debuted that August 12 as the Fox 21 Ten O'Clock News. The 35-minute newscast used WSPA-TV's news resources but had its own weeknight news anchors and set backdrop. WSPA reporter Milissa Rehberger served as the weekend anchor.

This first incarnation of WHNS news suffered in local perception from the fact it was produced by WSPA-TV, whose newscasts emphasized Spartanburg-area news. This hindered acceptance of the newscast in other parts of the multi-city market, such as Greenville and Asheville; one media buyer told Mediaweek that the newscast was a "stepchild". In early 1998, Meredith began planning to debut its own, in-house newscast which would draw on the station's regional identity, not tied to a specific city. To do so, the company hired 26 employees, including new anchors, and set up news bureaus in Greenville and Asheville. One anchor, Connie LeGrand, was retained from the WSPA setup. The in-house news department debuted in August 1999, at which time the 10 p.m. weeknight newscasts were expanded to an hour.

After establishing its own 10 p.m. news, WHNS expanded to other dayparts, though the first attempt did not last long. In September 2000, the station debuted a 4 p.m. newscast. The program failed to find an audience in that timeslot and was moved to 5 p.m. at the start of 2001. In 2006, WHNS tried again, this time in mornings with the debut of a four-hour morning newscast. A 6:30 p.m. newscast debuted in 2008.

In 2022, a 6:30 p.m. half-hour was restored and a local lifestyle show, Access Carolina, debuted at 10 a.m. An 11 a.m. newscast followed in January 2023, giving the station a block of local programming from 4:30 a.m. to noon.

== Technical information ==
=== Subchannels ===
WHNS's transmitter is located atop Slick Rock Mountain in Transylvania County, North Carolina. The station's signal is multiplexed:

Subchannels of WHNS
| Subchannel | Res. | Short name | Programming |
|---|---|---|---|
| 21.1 | 720p | WHNS | Fox |
| 21.2 | 720p | PS&E | Palmetto Sports & Entertainment |
| 21.3 | 480i | COZI | Cozi TV |
| 21.4 | 480i | BOUNCE | Bounce TV |
| 21.5 | 480i | GRIT | Grit |
| 21.6 | 480i | THE365 | 365BLK |
| 21.7 | 480i | Mystery | Ion Mystery |
| 40.4 | 480i | TCN | True Crime Network (WMYA-TV) |

Broadcast on behalf of another station

WHNS began airing a digital signal on October 15, 2002, on channel 57. It shut off its analog signal on June 12, 2009, and moved its digital signal to channel 21. WHNS relocated its signal from channel 21 to channel 17 in 2019 as a result of the 2016 United States wireless spectrum auction.

=== Translators ===
Five translators rebroadcast WHNS to areas in the mountains of western North Carolina that are blocked from the Slick Rock Mountain transmitter.

- Bryson City: W21DV-D
- Canton–Waynesville: W26FB-D
- Franklin: W15CW-D
- Sylva: W23EZ-D
- West Asheville: W34DX-D

== See also ==
- Channel 17 digital TV stations in the United States
- Channel 21 virtual TV stations in the United States
