= WLOS =

Television station in Asheville, North Carolina

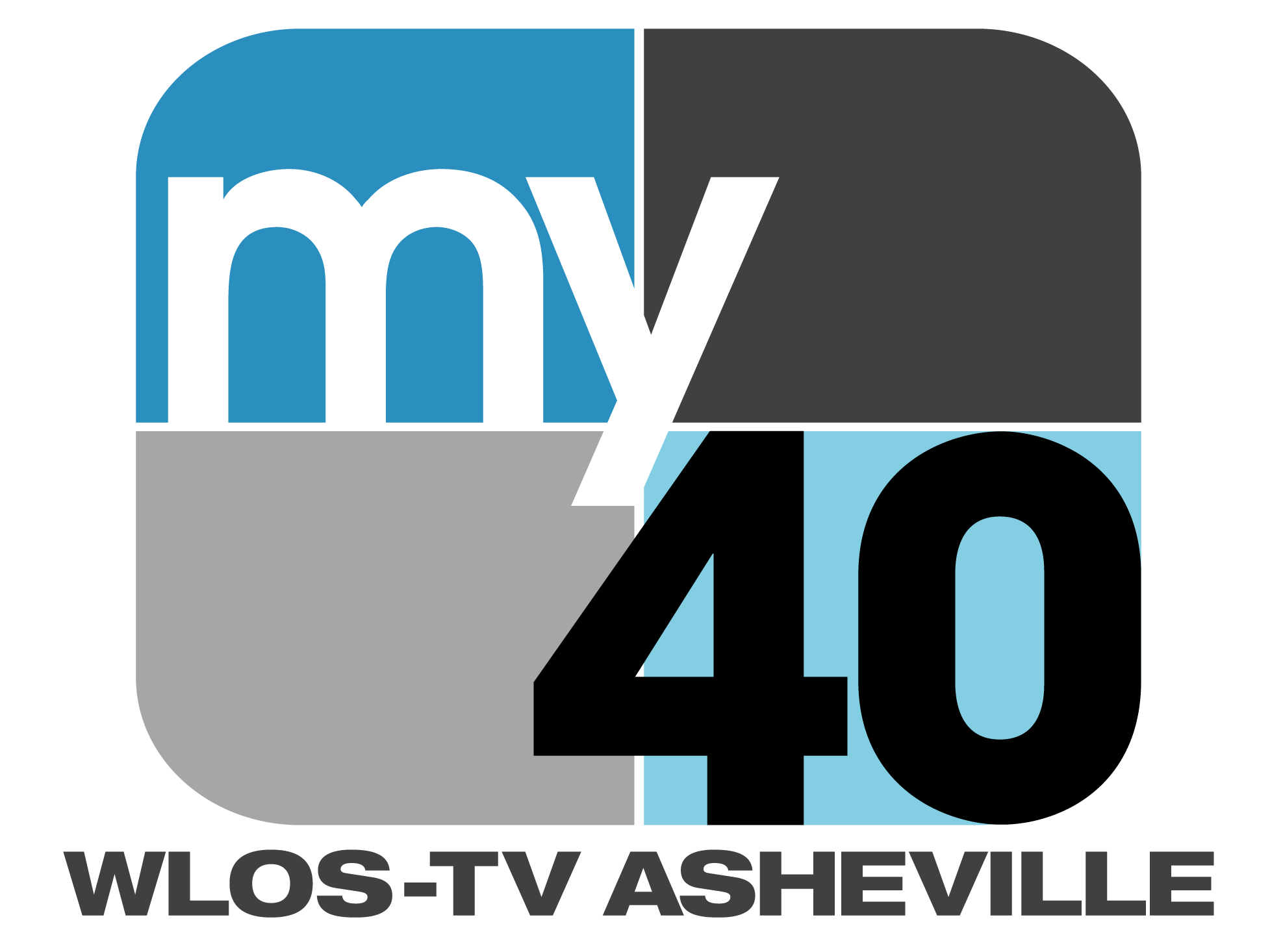
- Asheville, North Carolina; Greenville–Spartanburg–; Anderson, South Carolina; United States
- City: Asheville, North Carolina
- Channels: Digital: 13 (VHF); Virtual: 13
- Branding: ABC 13; News 13; My 40 (13.2)

Programming
- Affiliations: 13.1: ABC; 13.2: Independent with MyNetworkTV; for others, see § Subchannels

Ownership
- Owner: Sinclair Broadcast Group; (WLOS Licensee, LLC)
- Sister stations: WMYA-TV

History
- First air date: September 18, 1954
- Former call signs: WLOS-TV (1954–1984)
- Former channel numbers: Analog: 13 (VHF, 1954–2009); Digital: 56 (UHF, 2000–2009)
- Former affiliations: DuMont (1954–1956)
- Call sign meaning: "Wonderful Land of the Sky"

Technical information
- Licensing authority: FCC
- Facility ID: 56537
- ERP: 144 kW
- HAAT: 552 m (1,811 ft)
- Transmitter coordinates: 35°13′20″N 82°32′58″W
- Translator(s): see § Translators

Links
- Public license information: Public file; LMS
- Website: wlos.com

WLOS (channel 13) is a television station licensed to Asheville, North Carolina, United States, serving Western North Carolina and Upstate South Carolina as an affiliate of ABC and MyNetworkTV. It is owned by Sinclair Broadcast Group and operated alongside WMYA-TV (channel 40) in Anderson, South Carolina. WLOS maintains studios on Technology Drive (near I-26/US 74) in Asheville and a transmitter on Pinnacle Mountain in Henderson County, North Carolina.

WLOS-TV began broadcasting in September 1954 as the city's second TV station. It was founded by the Skyway Broadcasting Corporation, owner of WLOS radio, and owned by Wometco Enterprises from 1958 to 1987; Sinclair has owned it since 1996. Its local news coverage has historically focused on western North Carolina, in contrast to the other major stations in the market, all of which broadcast from studios in South Carolina.

== History ==
=== Early years ===
Prior to the 1948 freeze on television station applications imposed by the Federal Communications Commission (FCC), Skyway Broadcasting Corporation—owner of Asheville radio stations WLOS (1380 AM) and WLOS-FM (99.9)—had applied for the use of channel 7, one of three channels assigned to the city along with channel 5 (applied for by actress Mary Pickford) and 12. However, the major overhaul of TV allocations accompanying the introduction of ultra high frequency (UHF) channels resulted in only one VHF channel being allotted to Asheville: 13, along with UHF 56 (educational) and 62. The Skyway Broadcasting Company, corporate parent of WLOS, applied for channel 13 on December 7, 1951. It was soon joined by WSKY (1230 AM) in August 1952 and WWNC (570 AM), owned by the Asheville Citizen-Times Company, in March 1953. WSKY had withdrawn by August 1953, as had the Community Television Company, but Asheville tax attorney William W. Orr then filed in October, bringing the field back up to three contenders for channel 13.

In December 1953, the field cleared, and Orr and the Citizen-Times Company withdrew their applications to allow WLOS to get the construction permit; the latter received an option to buy stock in Skyway, though it was cautioned that such would require additional FCC approval. The next step was securing a transmitter site. WLOS immediately proposed to erect a 300-foot (91 m) tower atop Mount Pisgah, which was met with divided sentiment. Civic groups favored the location and claimed it was the only site in the mountainous area from which the station could provide regional coverage; others derided what they felt as the commercialization of the well-known summit. A United States Forest Service hearing in February 1954 drew 50 attendees and thousands of letters, telegrams, and postcards, but the federal government approved the Pisgah tower site at the end of February 1954. Meanwhile, the station acquired the Battle House, a 1925-built residence on Macon Avenue described by The Asheville Citizen as "long considered one of Asheville's finest ... [with] a reputation as a residential showplace", to use as its studios. By July 1954, work was under way on the Mount Pisgah transmitter facility, and a September 18 start date goal had been set; WLOS-TV had signed for affiliation with ABC and the DuMont Television Network.

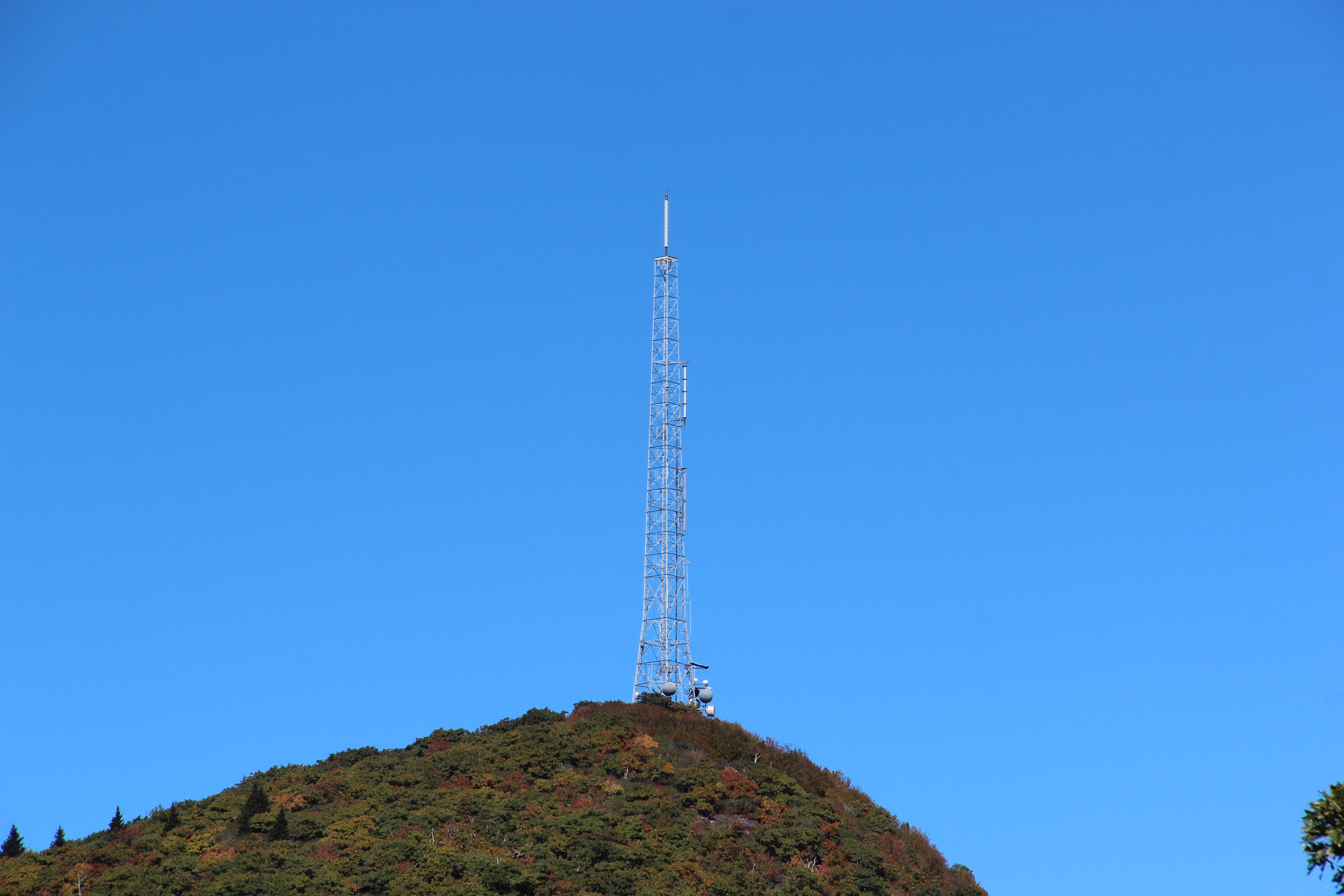
The WLOS transmitting tower on Mount Pisgah was used by channel 13 from 1954 to 2026.

WLOS-TV, as projected, began broadcasting on September 18, 1954. This gave Asheville its second station, as WISE-TV had begun broadcasting on channel 62 in August 1953. Local programming was immediately planned, including shows for housewives, children, and teenagers; the WLOS radio stations also occupied the Battle House. The Mount Pisgah transmitter site gave the station a wide coverage area; pre-launch advertising boasted of having the highest antenna in the South and a signal that reached Johnson City, Tennessee.

=== Wometco ownership ===
A squabble over options to purchase stock in Skyway Broadcasting Company erupted in April 1957, when Harold H. Thoms—owner of WISE radio and television—and Walter Tison of Tampa, Florida, announced they had an option to buy shares in the firm and were going to exercise it. Skyway denied that any such option existed, claiming that it was based on an option extended to a minority stockholder—J. E. Edmonds—and later withdrawn. The matter was taken to court, where Edmonds attacked the validity of the 1953 Citizen-Times option, which remained outstanding. Then, that option catapulted into the spotlight when Miami businessman Mitchell Wolfson—a summer resident of Asheville—announced that he had acquired the Citizen-Times option through his other broadcast property, WTVJ in Miami, and that he was offering a buyout of all other shareholders in Skyway. The so-called "Britt option" that Thoms and Tison claimed to hold became the subject of multiple court cases as Thoms and Tison sued Britt and others for breach of contract.

On March 1, 1958, Wolfson's company, Wometco Enterprises, announced it had reached a deal to buy Britt's stock in Skyway Broadcasting and thus assume majority ownership of the WLOS stations. The FCC approved the transaction in August, and upon closure, several WTVJ employees moved to Asheville to help manage WLOS radio and television.

In 1959, Bill Norwood, known on air as "Mr. Bill", began hosting a children's program under a range of titles (the last being Mr. Bill's Friends) which continued to air until June 1988, later returning as a fill-in weatherman in the late 1990s. Bill's sidekick was a clown named Bumbo, played by longtime WLOS weatherman Bob Caldwell.

Wometco sold off WLOS AM to the Greater Asheville Broadcasting Corporation in 1969, retaining the FM and TV stations; the AM station changed its call sign to WKKE when the sale took effect. WLOS continued to share ABC programming in the western Carolinas with WAIM-TV (channel 40) in Anderson, South Carolina, on the opposite end of the market. It was a dual ABC/CBS affiliate; while WAIM-TV's ABC affiliation agreement allowed it to carry any network program not aired by WLOS in Asheville, which was not receivable in the Anderson area. This ended in January 1979; after an ownership change at channel 40, ABC only allowed the station to continue airing its programming through the end of 1978.

=== Ownership changes ===
In 1984, Wometco was taken private in a leveraged buyout by Kohlberg Kravis Roberts (KKR). As part of this transaction, WLOS-FM was sold to WISE and became WRLX-FM and later WKSF. KKR struggled with the station, in part because ABC sank to third in the national ratings. It set revenue goals that were so unreachable that the entire WLOS-TV sales force turned over.

AnchorMedia, associated with the Robert M. Bass Group, acquired WLOS-TV for $50 million in 1987 after two attempts had been made in the preceding year to purchase the station from KKR. Anchor was a rapidly growing group in radio, having acquired stations in Dallas, Las Vegas, and Albuquerque, but WLOS-TV marked its first television station property. Anchor had also bid on WTVJ in Miami only to be beaten at the last minute by a bid from General Electric and NBC.

During AnchorMedia's ownership, the company attempted to acquire WAXA, the former WAIM-TV, in Anderson; the company proposed to simulcast WLOS on channel 40 for the benefit of viewers in the southern portion of the market who could not receive the Asheville station. The FCC denied an outright sale, citing the stations' overlapping coverage areas, but AnchorMedia continued to negotiate a simulcast agreement with WAXA's existing ownership. It also won a victory in federal appeals court, which ordered the FCC to reconsider its denial of the WAXA purchase. WLOS produced a limited amount of South Carolina-specific programming for air on channel 40, including a public affairs program, Viewpoint 40, and a 6 p.m. newscast using the resources of the Anderson Independent-Mail newspaper.

In 1994, Continental Broadcasting—the former AnchorMedia—was purchased by River City Broadcasting, a St. Louis-based owner of television and radio properties. The three ABC affiliates owned by Anchor represented River City's first major network affiliates. River City spun WAXA out as a separately programmed independent station, WFBC-TV, in September 1995. WFBC-TV later became The WB affiliate WBSC-TV in 1999 and MyNetworkTV affiliate WMYA-TV in 2006.

=== Sinclair ownership ===
River City merged with Sinclair Broadcast Group in 1996. WFBC-TV was sold to a related company to Sinclair, Glencairn, Ltd. Glencairn subsequently changed its name to Cunningham Broadcasting Corporation, but its stock is still almost entirely owned by the Smith family that owns Sinclair, and the companies continue to be closely related.

WLOS sold the Battle House studios to the adjoining Grove Park Inn in 1999 and began scouting for a new location. The station then secured space in the Biltmore Park commercial development south of downtown Asheville, with the first broadcasts from the new studio taking place in December 2000. Battle House was demolished in 2006; the inn argued that it was too deteriorated to be preserved and that a half-century of use as a TV studio had resulted in too many alterations. Among these were replacement of windows and doors and the removal of many finishes, as well as an addition to the structure made by the television station.

By 2014, WLOS ranked second in estimated revenue, ahead of NBC affiliate WYFF in Greenville but behind WSPA-TV; this was an improvement from 2011, when it trailed both of the Upstate stations in revenue.

On September 20, 2021, "My 40" and the MyNetworkTV programming on WMYA-TV moved exclusively to the 13.2 subchannel of WLOS. In 2024, WLOS announced its intention to move its transmitter site from Mount Pisgah to Pinnacle Mountain, which unlike Mount Pisgah provides engineers with year-round access. The switch was made on June 22, 2026.

== News operation ==
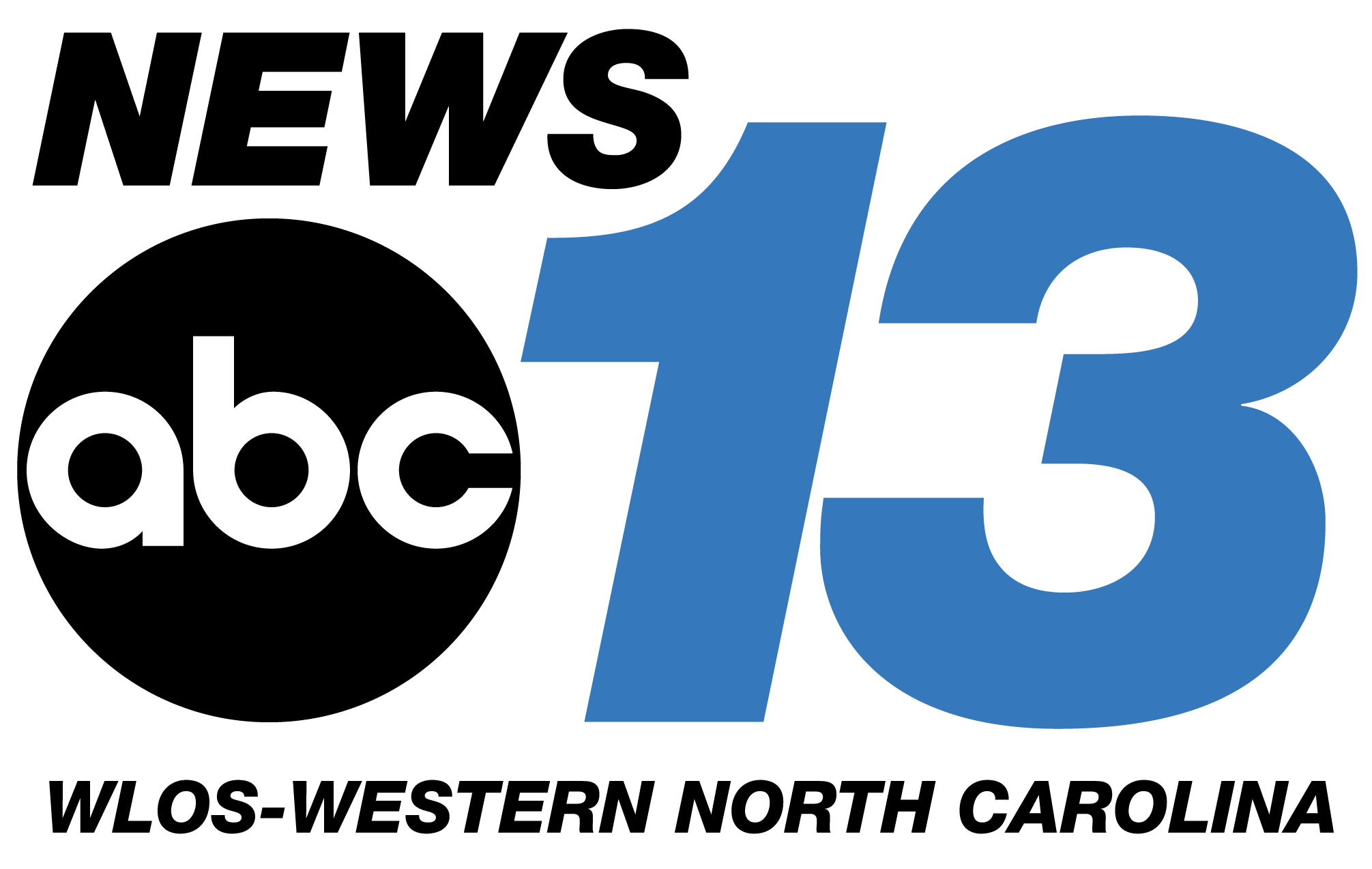
News logo

As the major station based in Asheville, WLOS has traditionally focused its regional news coverage on western North Carolina, where it achieves higher ratings than its competitors. It was also initially the smallest of the three TV newsrooms in the region. After airing its main early evening newscasts at 5:30 and later 7 p.m., WLOS went head-to-head with the South Carolina stations (then-WFBC-TV and WSPA-TV) in 1979 and began airing its evening news at 6 p.m.

Even though the station's focus is western North Carolina, management recognized the station needed a presence in the South Carolina part of the market if it was to lift itself from an overall third-place finish in the combined market. By the late 1970s, the station had a bureau in Greenville, which moved into a new building in 1984; that year, it also set up a news bureau in Spartanburg. The station expanded its news coverage with the addition of a new 5:30 p.m. newscast—in addition to its 6 p.m. report—in 1986, and a morning newscast debuted upon the end of Mr. Bill and Friends in 1988. AnchorMedia also invested in new equipment upon taking over. News programming slowly expanded: by 2008, the station had a two-hour morning newscast, 90 minutes of early evening news, and the 11 p.m. newscast on weeknights, and WMYA aired 6:30 and 10 p.m. newscasts produced by WLOS.

In 2022, WLOS debuted a weekly sports show during the football season, Saturday Sports Night, covering regional college football.

=== Notable former on-air staff ===
- Mike Bettes – chief meteorologist, to 2004
- Heather Childers – weekend anchor, 1999–2002
- David Steele – sportscaster

== Technical information ==
=== Subchannels ===
WLOS's main transmitter is located on Pinnacle Mountain in Henderson County, North Carolina. The station's signal is multiplexed:

Subchannels of WLOS
Subchannel	Res.	Short name	Programming
13.1	720p	ABC	ABC
13.2	720p	MyTV	Independent with MyNetworkTV
13.3	480i	Antenna	Antenna TV
13.4	480i	TheNest	The Nest
13.5	480i	GetTV	Great

=== Analog-to-digital conversion ===
WLOS ended regular programming on its analog signal, over VHF channel 13, on June 12, 2009. It had intended to do so on February 17, even after the federal government moved the deadline back four months, but general manager Jack Connors explained that the FCC would have also required the station's analog translators, many of them serving mountainous areas shaded from Mount Pisgah by terrain, to be switched off at that time. The station's digital signal relocated from its pre-transition UHF channel 56, which was among the high-band UHF channels (52–69) that were removed from broadcasting use as a result of the transition, to VHF channel 13.

=== Translators ===
WLOS operates a series of translators across the mountains of western North Carolina and upstate South Carolina. These translators serve as low-power, limited-area repeaters that bring the station's signal to towns in deep mountain valleys where the parent signal is blocked by the surrounding terrain.

- Franklin, NC: W11AJ-D
- Black Mountain, NC: W12AQ-D
- Waynesville, NC: W12AR-D
- Hot Springs, NC: W12CI-D
- Robbinsville, NC: W14EG-D
- Maggie Valley, NC: W15DR-D
- Marion, NC: W15DY-D
- West Asheville, NC (High Top Mountain): W19FE-D
- Bryson City, NC: W30DX-D
- Pickens, SC: W31DY-D
- Tryon, etc., NC: W32EO-D
- Sapphire Valley, etc., NC: W34EP-D
