= WMYA-TV =

Television station in Anderson, South Carolina

ATSC 3.0 station
- Anderson–Greenville–; Spartanburg, South Carolina; Asheville, North Carolina; United States
- City: Anderson, South Carolina
- Channels: Digital: 35 (UHF); Virtual: 40

Programming
- Affiliations: 40.1: Roar; for others, see § Subchannels

Ownership
- Owner: Cunningham Broadcasting; (Anderson (WFBC-TV) Licensee, Inc.)
- Operator: Sinclair Broadcast Group
- Sister stations: WLOS

History
- First air date: December 11, 1953
- Former call signs: WAIM-TV (1953–1983); WAXA (1983–1995); WFBC-TV (1995–1999); WBSC-TV (1999–2006)
- Former channel numbers: Analog: 40 (UHF, 1953–2009); Digital: 14 (UHF, 2001–2019)
- Former affiliations: CBS (1953–1976); ABC (1976–1978; via WLOS, 1991–1995); Fox (1986–1988); Independent (1979, 1984–1986, 1988–1989, 1995–1999); Dark (1979–1984, 1989–1991); The WB (1999–2006); MyNetworkTV (2006–2021); Dabl (2021–2025)
- Call sign meaning: MyNetworkTV Anderson (former affiliation)

Technical information
- Licensing authority: FCC
- Facility ID: 56548
- ERP: 750 kW
- HAAT: 320 m (1,050 ft)
- Transmitter coordinates: 34°38′51″N 82°16′12″W

Links
- Public license information: Public file; LMS

WMYA-TV (channel 40) is a television station licensed to Anderson, South Carolina, United States, serving Upstate South Carolina and Western North Carolina with programming from the digital multicast network Roar. It is owned by Cunningham Broadcasting and operated by Sinclair Broadcast Group alongside Asheville, North Carolina–licensed ABC/MyNetworkTV affiliate WLOS (channel 13). The nominal main studio for WMYA-TV is the WLOS news bureau on Villa Road in Greenville, South Carolina; WMYA-TV's transmitter is located in Fountain Inn, South Carolina.

Founded as WAIM-TV in 1953, the station primarily broadcast local network programming to Anderson and the far western Upstate, serving as an affiliate of ABC and CBS after 1956. However, it lost the ABC affiliation at the start of 1979. An attempted relaunch as a full-market independent station failed after six months, leading to more than five years of silence. It reemerged as WAXA and had more success serving the market, including two years as the region's first Fox affiliate. However, after the death of its owner in 1987 and more than a year off the air, the station was sold to WLOS for use as a rebroadcaster to reach areas of the Upstate that its Asheville-centric signal could not. In 1995, WLOS converted WAXA to separate programming as independent WFBC-TV. It then became an affiliate of The WB and later MyNetworkTV. Its programming was moved to a subchannel of WLOS in 2021, leaving WMYA to rebroadcast national digital subchannels. In 2022, the station became the ATSC 3.0 (NextGen TV) transmitter for upstate South Carolina; its subchannels are now transmitted by other local stations on its behalf.

== History ==
=== WAIM-TV ===
On February 29, 1952, Wilton E. Hall, publisher of the Anderson Independent and Daily Mail (since merged as the Anderson Independent-Mail) and owner of radio stations WAIM (1230 AM) and WCAC-FM (101.1), applied to the Federal Communications Commission (FCC) for approval to build a new television station in Anderson on channel 58. Another application was filed for channel 58 by the Anderson Television Company, and in August 1953, at Hall's request, the FCC added channel 40 to Anderson. The FCC then granted the construction permit for WAIM-TV on September 30, 1953. The station was quickly built and began broadcasting on December 11, 1953.

Originally an affiliate of CBS, the station's financial viability was nearly immediately jeopardized. Spartanburg radio station WORD held a construction permit for very high frequency (VHF) channel 7 and sought to use it on an interim basis from Paris Mountain, 27 miles (43 km) west of Spartanburg and closer to Anderson than the originally proposed site of Hogback Mountain. The threat of a new VHF station which, unlike the UHF station Hall operated, could reach all homes without sets having to be converted immediately dimmed WAIM-TV's prospects. In February 1954, Hall petitioned the FCC to set aside its earlier grant of temporary authority for WORD-TV, later changed to WSPA-TV, to broadcast from Paris Mountain, having already lost nearly $60,000 in canceled advertising contracts and lost CBS revenue; he feared losing his CBS affiliation altogether. WAIM-TV was one of three stations protesting this relocation of channel 7, along with WGVL (channel 23) in Greenville and the never-built WSCV (channel 17) in Spartanburg; all three protests were denied.

WGVL and WAIM-TV took the case to the United States Court of Appeals for the D.C. Circuit, seeking injunctive relief from the FCC ruling, in the summer of 1954. On January 31, 1955, the appeals court heard arguments by WGVL and WAIM against the WSPA-TV authorization on Paris Mountain, having obtained six months prior a restraining order preventing Spartan from building its transmitter facility until the case was heard (though the studios were near completion and initial preparations had been made on Paris Mountain). While WGVL and WAIM-TV claimed that the FCC should not have granted the application without giving them a hearing, the commission argued that they did not have standing to show injury that would be caused by WSPA-TV going on air and that the procedure the stations sought to use was the improper forum to delay such a grant. Even though the two UHF stations won a hearing at the FCC, the hearing examiner's recommendation would not be favorable to them. Examiner James D. Cunningham recommended the FCC approve the WSPA-TV move to Paris Mountain, saying that the UHF stations "failed to make a satisfactory showing" as to the economic damages they would incur and that, because UHF converters were widely distributed in their broadcast areas, they would not be at a disadvantage. WGVL and WAIM-TV counsel asked for oral argument on the decision, warning that it would be "aggravating the forces now making for unequal competition in the television field and hastening the trend towards complete obliteration of UHF".

The FCC made a final decision in favor of Spartan on March 9, 1956, reaffirming many of the arguments made by the hearing examiner. When the appeals court gave its approval for WSPA-TV, WGVL and WAIM-TV announced their intentions to leave the air. On Sunday, April 29, 1956, WSPA-TV signed on; channel 23 left the air that day, Concurrently, the station also unsuccessfully sought relief in the form of moving channel 7 out of the Upstate and to Knoxville, Tennessee, while Hall engaged with equipment manufacturer Federal Telecommunications Laboratories in a legal dispute; he stopped paying what he owed on a transmitter he claimed was defective, "worthless and useless" because it could not broadcast network color programming in color.

WAIM-TV temporarily suspended operation on May 27, only to return two days later after securing additional programming. In July, it became an affiliate of ABC. In addition to a secondary affiliation with CBS, the station also broadcast South Carolina Educational Television daytime programs for schools for a time in the 1960s. While WAIM-TV's ABC affiliation agreement allowed it to carry any network program not aired by WLOS in Asheville, which was not receivable in the Anderson area, WLOS permitted the station to rebroadcast all ABC programs it aired. The station aired a limited schedule and sold very little local advertising.

In 1977, Hall announced the sale of his broadcasting properties to Frank L. Outlaw II of Greenville; the $850,000 transaction marked his retirement. Outlaw promised to begin live TV broadcasts from the Anderson studio. The sale was approved by the FCC the next year—with Outlaw selling a half-stake to Bob Nations and doing business under the name "The ONE Corporation" (Outlaw-Nations Entertainment)—but it also started the clock ticking on the need to reinvent channel 40. The owners had feared that they could have had to shutter the station on July 1, but ABC gave the station an extra six months to continue broadcasting its programming through the end of 1978. In the last two months of the year, the station began to transition its schedule to that of an independent. During this time, it began broadcasting in color. On January 1, 1979, WAIM-TV became a full-time independent station.

Rather quickly, Nations and Outlaw found that Anderson merchants were not ready to do much television advertising. The station needed to get on cable across the Upstate to be viable as an independent. While some systems added WAIM-TV, cable penetration was too low in those days to meaningfully increase the station's potential audience. The station had begun airing 18 hours per day after becoming an independent but was forced to cut back to eight hours per day later in January. Nations and Outlaw initially planned to return the dropped programming to the schedule once advertising picked up, but by April, Nations and Outlaw put the station back on the market. In mid-May 1979, the transmitter broke down, plunging channel 40 into a silence that would last five years.

Nations and Outlaw sold a minority stake in the station to Ivey Communications of Orlando, Florida. Plans were formulated to return the station to service by the summer of 1980 with an upgraded physical plant. By December 1980, mid-1981 was cited as a date for the station's return.

=== WAXA ===
New South Television sold WAIM-TV in 1983 to Mark III Broadcasting of South Carolina, a subsidiary of Atlanta-based Agronomics, Inc. Agronomics changed the call letters to WAXA, obtained approval for a new tower site for the station, and broke ground in November 1983 on studios on the US 29 bypass. Mark III built a 1,051-foot (320 m) tower in the Fork Shoals section of Fountain Inn, over 600 feet (180 m) taller than WAIM-TV's old tower near Anderson College. It featured a transmitter capable of 2.5 million watts of power, enough to cover the entire Upstate, though not Asheville; WAXA applied for a translator on channel 46 to cover that area.

After five and a half years, channel 40 returned to South Carolina screens on October 1, 1984, with a lineup mostly consisting of movies and syndicated reruns. Several local programs were added, including three music video shows and public affairs program Straight Talk. Stereo sound broadcasting began in March, making WAXA the first station in South Carolina to provide it.

WAXA was the area's first Fox affiliate when the network started on October 9, 1986; it also debuted on Asheville cable the next month, a major development for a station that had long struggled to reach viewers in western North Carolina.

However, momentum was halted by the death of Agronomics owner Anthony Kupris in October 1987; his widow Mary was largely an absentee owner who at one point told The Greenville News, "I'm not a broadcaster". In May 1988, Mary reached a deal to sell WAXA to Jones Commercial, Inc., of Chicago. Another major setback occurred while the deal was pending when Pappas Telecasting Companies, owner of competing independent WHNS (channel 21), secured a group affiliation deal with Fox. WAXA was one of several Fox affiliates who were displeased with the poor performance of Fox's Saturday night lineup; this was one factor in channel 40 severing ties with Fox. No contract was ever finalized with Jones, and while WAXA claimed that getting out of its Fox affiliation was reducing programming costs, it did lay off some staff in late 1988 for what it termed "budgetary reasons".

=== Simulcast of WLOS ===
In March 1989, it was reported that AnchorMedia, the owner of WLOS, was interested in acquiring WAXA. The next month, a sale contract was announced, as were plans for AnchorMedia to run the station as a satellite of WLOS for the benefit of viewers who received a marginal signal from that station.

The AnchorMedia deal required FCC approval, which was its own wrinkle because it would have created overlap with WLOS. At the time, one company could not own two television stations in the same media market. Awaiting this approval, and with many program contracts expiring, WAXA went off the air on September 1, 1989. Six months later, the FCC ruled; it found that the purchase of WAXA was not in the public interest and denied the transaction. However, the two parties continued to negotiate a simulcast agreement by which the station would not be sold outright but still simulcast WLOS.

In January 1991, WAXA returned to the air as a near-total simulcast of WLOS. AnchorMedia and Mary Kupris appealed the FCC's denial of the outright sale of the station and won a victory at the United States Court of Appeals for the District of Columbia Circuit, which ordered the FCC to reconsider its denial; one concurring statement by Laurence Silberman noted that the court even considered ordering the transfer granted and expressed the opinion that "there is no alternative use for the frequency". That August, a public affairs program for the Anderson area, Viewpoint 40, was introduced as an opt-out for WAXA viewers only. In 1992, WLOS reached a deal with the Independent-Mail to share news material and announced it would start producing a South Carolina newscast at 6 p.m. for air on channel 40.

=== WB and MyNetworkTV affiliation ===
AnchorMedia, under the name Continental Broadcasting, sold its three television stations to River City Broadcasting of St. Louis in 1994. River City embarked on a strategy to operate channel 40 with separate programming from WLOS. On September 2, 1995, the station became independent station WFBC-TV (call letters previously used by WYFF from 1953 to 1983), using a mix of newly acquired programs and shows to which WLOS already held the rights.

River City sold its assets to Sinclair Broadcast Group in 1996. Because River City had split WFBC-TV from WLOS, Sinclair itself could not purchase both stations. The license for WFBC-TV was assigned to Glencairn, Ltd., a new group headed by former Sinclair executive Edwin Edwards. The family of Sinclair Broadcast Group founder Julian Sinclair Smith owned 97 percent of Glencairn's stock, effectively making WLOS and WFBC-TV a duopoly in violation of FCC rules. Sinclair further circumvented the rules by having WLOS take over WFBC-TV's operations as the senior partner in a local marketing agreement. Pulitzer Broadcasting, owner of WYFF, petitioned against the River City sale of WFBC-TV to Glencairn, contending that the combination of the Glencairn sale and LMA with WLOS would give Sinclair an "unfair competitive wedge" in the market.

Rainbow/PUSH, headed by Jesse Jackson, filed challenges against Glencairn's planned merger with Sinclair in 1998, citing concerns over a single company holding two broadcast licenses in one market and arguing that Glencairn—headed by former Sinclair executive Edwin Edwards, a Black man—passed itself off as a minority-owned company. The FCC levied a $40,000 fine against Sinclair in 2001 for illegally controlling Glencairn; it also prevented Sinclair from buying WBSC-TV outright because it would have left the Greenville/Spartanburg/Asheville market with only seven unique TV station owners in the market as a result. FCC rules of the time required a market to have at least eight unique owners once a duopoly is formed. Glencairn subsequently changed its name to Cunningham Broadcasting Corporation, but its stock is still almost entirely owned by the Smith family, and the companies continued to be closely related.

As part of a 1997 affiliation agreement between Sinclair and The WB, WFBC-TV became a WB affiliate on September 6, 1999, and changed its call letters to WBSC-TV to reflect its programming and location in South Carolina.

In 2006, when The WB and UPN merged to form The CW, Sinclair first elected to affiliate with MyNetworkTV, a new network started by Fox Television Stations, over The CW. On March 2, ten days after the network's existence was announced on February 22, Sinclair affiliated 17 stations it owned or managed, including WBSC-TV, with the network. The call letters were changed to WMYA-TV in recognition of the new network affiliation. Local programming also continued to air. In 2008, the station began airing a fall package of local high school football games—North Carolina games on Thursdays and South Carolina games on Fridays—which by 2015 drew viewership comparable to or greater than MyNetworkTV programming.

On September 20, 2021, "My 40" and the MyNetworkTV programming moved exclusively to the 13.2 subchannel of WLOS. This left the WMYA-TV multiplex airing four diginets, with the main subchannel airing Dabl, in time for ATSC 3.0 conversion in 2022.

In August 2025, the station flipped to Roar.

== Technical information ==
WMYA-TV's signal (contour map pictured) covers the Upstate but does not reach Asheville, North Carolina.

=== Subchannels ===
The station's ATSC 1.0 channels are carried on the multiplexed signals of other television stations in the market:

Subchannels provided by WMYA-DT (ATSC 1.0)
Subchannel	Res.	Short name	Programming	ATSC 1.0 host
40.1	480i	ROAR	Roar	WYFF
40.2	480i	Charge!	Charge!	WSPA-TV
40.3	480i	COMET	Comet (4:3)	WYFF
40.4	480i	TCN	True Crime Network	WHNS

=== Analog-to-digital conversion ===
WMYA ended regular programming on its analog signal, over UHF channel 40, on February 17, 2009, one day after the original date for full-power television stations in the United States to transition from analog to digital broadcasts under federal mandate (which Congress had moved the previous week to June 12). The station's digital signal remained on its pre-transition UHF channel 14, using virtual channel 40. The analog signal remained on for a time after as part of the SAFER Act to provide transition information.

=== ATSC 3.0 lighthouse ===
WMYA-TV broadcasts these subchannels from its transmitter in Fountain Inn, South Carolina.

Subchannels of WMYA-TV (ATSC 3.0)
Subchannel	Res.	Short name	Programming
4.1	1080i	WYFF	NBC (WYFF)
7.1	1080i	WSPA	The CW (WSPA-TV)
13.1	720p	WLOS	ABC (WLOS)
13.10	1080p	T2	T2
13.11	1080p	PBTV	Pickleballtv
21.1	720p	WHNS	Fox (WHNS)
40.1	720p	WMYA	Roar

Subchannel broadcast with digital rights management
Subchannel streamed via the internet

On June 2, 2022, WMYA-TV was converted to ATSC 3.0 (NextGen TV), with simulcasts from WYFF, WSPA-TV, WLOS and WHNS.
