= WSPA-TV =

Television station in Spartanburg, South Carolina

- Alternate logo
- Spartanburg–Greenville–; Anderson, South Carolina; Asheville, North Carolina; United States
- City: Spartanburg, South Carolina
- Channels: Digital: 11 (VHF), shared with WYCW; Virtual: 7
- Branding: 7News, CW7

Programming
- Affiliations: 7.1: The CW; 7.3: Ion

Ownership
- Owner: Nexstar Media Group; (Nexstar Media Inc.)
- Sister stations: WYCW

History
- First air date: April 29, 1956
- Former call signs: WORD-TV (CP, 1953–1954)
- Former channel numbers: Analog: 7 (VHF, 1956–2009); Digital: 53 (UHF, 2000–2009), 7 (VHF, 2009–2020)
- Former affiliations: CBS (1956–2026); The WB (secondary, 1995–1997)
- Call sign meaning: Spartanburg

Technical information
- Licensing authority: FCC
- Facility ID: 66391
- ERP: 33.5 kW
- HAAT: 674.2 m (2,212 ft)
- Transmitter coordinates: 35°10′12.7″N 82°17′25.8″W
- Translator(s): see § Translators

Links
- Public license information: Public file; LMS
- Website: www.wspa.com

WSPA-TV (channel 7) is a television station licensed to Spartanburg, South Carolina, United States, serving Upstate South Carolina and Western North Carolina with programming from The CW. It is owned by Nexstar Media Group alongside Asheville, North Carolina–licensed WYCW (channel 62), an independent station. The two stations share studios on International Drive (next to the I-26 and I-85 Business/Veterans Parkway interchange) in Spartanburg and a transmitter on Hogback Mountain in northeastern Greenville County, South Carolina, southwest of Tryon, North Carolina.

WSPA-TV began broadcasting in April 1956 amid a controversy that spanned a decade over the station's proposed transmitter site. Owned by the locally based Spartan Radiocasting Company (renamed Spartan Communications in 1995) for more than four decades, it was a CBS affiliate from its inception and the second VHF television station in Upstate South Carolina. Its original studios in downtown Spartanburg were destroyed by fire in 1960; the station rebuilt at another site downtown but constructed its present facilities in 1979. Spartan Communications was acquired by Media General in 2000; under Media General, the station enjoyed strong local news ratings performances, moving from its traditional second-place to first against traditional news ratings leader WYFF. Nexstar acquired Media General in 2017; the station has since slipped back to second place in news ratings. On August 1, 2026, WSPA-TV lost its CBS affiliation to WYFF and began airing CW programming and expanded local news coverage.

== Early years ==
=== Permitting ===
When the Federal Communications Commission (FCC) ended its multi-year freeze on television stations in April 1952, it allotted very high frequency (VHF) channel 7 to Spartanburg instead of the state capital of Columbia. Two radio station owners in Spartanburg made plans to apply for the channel: the Broadcasting Company of the South, owner of WSPA (950 AM), and the Spartan Radiocasting Company, owner of WORD (910 AM). Spartan's owner, Walter J. Brown, had been instrumental in getting channel 7 assigned to Spartanburg and not Columbia; when a proposed table of allotments threatened to leave Spartanburg without any VHF channels, he pressed South Carolina's governor, fellow Spartanburg resident James F. Byrnes, to use his influence with the FCC to move channel 7 from Columbia to Spartanburg. Spartan Radiocasting attempted to have Broadcasting Company of the South disqualified once it received the construction permit for WIS-TV on channel 10 at Columbia due to alleged overlap, which the FCC dismissed.

The dispute between the two station owners ended in an unusual settlement. On November 26, 1953, Broadcasting Company of the South announced an agreement with Spartan Radiocasting under which, if Spartan were granted channel 7, it would acquire WSPA and its FM sister station from Broadcasting Company of the South and sell off the stations it already owned. The commission agreed to the transaction, which saw Spartan owner Walter J. Brown sell off one station he founded (WORD) to acquire another (WSPA). A deal to sell off WORD was agreed in January 1954. Originally designated WORD-TV, the call sign on the channel 7 construction permit was changed to WSPA-TV in March 1954.

=== The Paris Mountain dispute ===
Hogback Mountain (red) and Paris Mountain (blue)

Channel 7 was originally designated to operate from a site on Hogback Mountain, 25 miles (40 km) northwest of Spartanburg and 24 miles (39 km) northeast of Greenville. But in January 1954, the FCC permitted a temporary operation from the former WFBC-FM transmitter site on Paris Mountain, 6 miles (9.7 km) from Greenville, until Hogback was ready, so that Spartan could bring television to Spartanburg sooner. This application was vociferously opposed by two operating television stations and a third permittee, all in the ultra high frequency (UHF) band: WGVL (channel 23) of Greenville, WAIM-TV (channel 40) of Anderson, and the unbuilt WSCV (channel 17) of Spartanburg. They feared that, were the station to go on the air, it would be in effect a Greenville station, and they claimed that the Paris Mountain move would be permanent and would cause them economic injury by encouraging CBS to affiliate with the new VHF station. The WSCV permittee had noted that CBS was unwilling to grant WSPA-TV an affiliation if it broadcast from Hogback to protect the service area of WBTV in Charlotte, North Carolina. Days later, CBS signed an affiliation agreement with WSPA-TV. The UHF stations continued to fight against the channel 7 permit. Wilton E. Hall, the owner of WAIM-TV, alleged that in the short time between the granting of the Paris Mountain permit and February 8, his station had lost nearly $60,000 in network revenue and advertising contracts. A senator joined the UHF stations in their plea: Edwin C. Johnson of Colorado, who decried the damage done to not only the operating WAIM-TV and WGVL but the unbuilt WSCV.

After the FCC denied their pleas, the UHF stations took their fight to the United States Court of Appeals for the District of Columbia Circuit. While WSPA-TV, in response to the court ruling against it, initially gave up the temporary authority to build on Paris Mountain with the stated aim of instituting a regular and not an interim service, it then asked to modify its primary construction permit for the same site. The FCC by majority vote approved this modification on April 30, 1954, finding that it met the technical standards for separation and signal strength in Spartanburg. The two operating UHF stations, WGVL and WAIM-TV, each protested the grant. The FCC initially rebuffed their requests for a review, but the appeals court in March 1955 ordered the commission to hold a hearing, noting that both stations were CBS affiliates in danger of losing their network affiliation. The stations made their economic injury claims in three days of hearings in April, with WGVL and WAIM-TV each opening their books to describe their mounting losses and near-zero network revenues. Hall also made an unsuccessful plea that channel 7 be moved out of Spartanburg entirely to Knoxville, Tennessee, or another city, forcing WSPA-TV to a UHF channel.

In an initial decision released in September 1955, FCC chief hearing examiner James D. Cunningham proposed to affirm the Paris Mountain grant. Cunningham found that it mattered little from where the station broadcast because the effect of its transmissions would be the same from either site in Greenville and Anderson. WGVL and WAIM-TV appealed this ruling to the full FCC, but the FCC issued a final decision favoring WSPA-TV on March 9, 1956, and Brown announced that the station—its studios complete with closed-circuit telecasting underway since late 1955—would go on the air the next month. In its ruling, the FCC found that even after getting authority for Paris Mountain, Brown tried to "sell" CBS on the Hogback site like a "vacuum sweeper salesman" and rejected the claims of economic injury.

When the Court of Appeals gave final approval for WSPA-TV to begin from Paris Mountain on April 29, 1956, WGVL and WAIM-TV announced that they would leave the air. WSPA-TV was the sixth VHF television station in South Carolina with coverage of parts of three states. WGVL left the air that day, while WAIM-TV only briefly left the air before returning.

Even though WSPA-TV was on the air, the Paris Mountain case was not over, as the appeals court had yet to consider the merits of the UHF stations' protest. In a unanimous ruling from judge David L. Bazelon, on September 6, 1956, the court found that the FCC had erred in letting the station make the move. It cited engineering data that showed the Paris Mountain site served hundreds of thousands fewer people and called Spartan's "misrepresentation" as to whether it would permanently operate from there "calculated". It also agreed with a previously rejected claim that the stronger signal in Greenville made WSPA-TV, in effect, a Greenville station. The order was revised to allow WSPA-TV to remain on the air while the case was adjudicated, which the UHF stations further fought. Though the FCC upheld the stay and called the misrepresentation not willful in a July 1957 decision, the appeals court ordered another hearing of the Paris Mountain matter in May 1958 because it felt the commission had failed to justify the reduction of service. In written testimony, Walter Brown revealed that CBS would not pull its affiliation from channel 7 if it had to move to Hogback Mountain, a reversal of what had appeared to be the situation in the past.

In January 1961, the FCC found Spartan Radiocasting qualified to be a broadcast licensee but ordered the Paris Mountain grant to be set aside. The transmitter site matter then became entangled with a separate issue against Spartan Radiocasting. That July, the FCC ordered the record reopened to consider a 1956 ex parte off-the-record contact made by Brown to FCC commissioner Rosel Hyde and any influence Brown might have had on a letter written by South Carolina senator Strom Thurmond to former FCC chairman George McConnaughey. The cases were finally decided by the FCC in November 1962; Brown was cleared of the ex parte charges, but WSPA-TV had to move off Paris Mountain. As a result, construction began in earnest on Hogback Mountain. On October 14, 1963, the video transmitter was moved to Hogback; for a week, the video and audio on WSPA-TV were broadcast from separate sites until the audio transmitter was moved.

With the move to Hogback, WSPA-TV began planning the installation of translators to serve areas screened from the mountaintop site by terrain. By October 1964, six such translators were in service in Georgia and North Carolina.

== Spartan ownership (1956–2000) ==
After beginning operations, WSPA-TV initially operated for seven hours a day, later 12, from its studios on Main Street. In addition to CBS programs, it presented local shows including The Jane Dalton Show, Carolina Showtime, Cousin Bud's Settin' Room, Dancetown, and Tim the Squirrel. On the morning of May 16, 1960, a fire started in the air conditioning system and swept through the building shared by the WSPA radio and television stations, gutting it in what was deemed one of the worst fires in Spartanburg history to date. Operations continued unimpeded; Charlotte's WBTV and Greenville's WFBC-TV (now WYFF) loaned equipment, and all television broadcasting shifted to Paris Mountain. In order to replace the lost studios, Spartan Radiocasting leased a former Colonial Stores grocery store on Converse Street and refitted it as a television studio within less than two months. This facility was expanded and remodeled in 1966, enabling WSPA-TV to be the first in the market to begin live local color broadcasting that September.

WSPA-TV left downtown Spartanburg in April 1979, when it relocated to a new, 43,000-square-foot (4,000 m^{2}) building near the interchange of Interstate 85 and Interstate 26 that had been under construction since 1977.

Walter J. Brown, who had been the president of Spartan Radiocasting since 1947, became its chairman in 1988. The company was renamed Spartan Communications in September 1995, shortly before Brown's death that November.

During the late 1990s, Spartan Communications and WSPA-TV embarked on a series of relevant regional expansions. The first was a 1995 local marketing agreement with WNEG-TV (channel 32) in Toccoa, Georgia, which returned over-the-air CBS access to northeast Georgia after an affiliation switch in Atlanta the year prior. In 1997, Spartan Communications teamed with Pappas Telecasting to relaunch WASV-TV (channel 62) as an affiliate of The WB and UPN, operating the new station under a local marketing agreement.

== Media General and Nexstar ownership and CBS disaffiliation ==
On December 8, 1999, Spartan Communications agreed to be purchased by Media General for $605 million. The transaction bolstered Media General's portfolio of Southeastern TV stations while marking the end of a local, family-owned broadcaster.

On March 1, 2009, WSPA's digital tower on Hogback Mountain—built in 2000 for the launch of digital service that June—collapsed in a wind storm, taking down the tower used for analog broadcasting—dating to the 1970s—as it fell. WSPA's digital signal was restored as a subchannel of WYCW, and a replacement antenna was mounted on the remnant lower portion of the digital tower to broadcast a temporary analog and digital service until a replacement tower was constructed.

On September 8, 2015, Media General announced that it would acquire the Meredith Corporation, then-owner of regional Fox affiliate WHNS (channel 21), for $2.4 billion to form Meredith Media General. With WSPA and WHNS among the four highest-rated stations in the market, one of WSPA or WHNS would have had to be divested had the deal gone through. That sale was canceled on January 27, 2016, in favor of a sale of Media General to the Nexstar Broadcasting Group that was completed in January 2017.

WSPA-TV lost its CBS affiliation to WYFF on August 1, 2026, as part of a modified renewal of most other Nexstar affiliations with CBS. Greenville–Spartanburg–Asheville was one of four markets where stations owned by Hearst Television assumed the CBS affiliation from Nexstar-owned stations in their markets. WSPA then took over the CW affiliation from sister station WYCW, with the latter becoming an independent station.

== News operation ==
As in other multi-city markets, news viewership in the Greenville–Spartanburg–Asheville market has tended to be fragmented by city. Consequently, WSPA-TV's news viewership has traditionally been strongest in and around Spartanburg, and its newscasts emphasize coverage of Upstate South Carolina. Though WYFF has traditionally been the leader in total news viewership in the market, WSPA has been its most common competitor, particularly for Upstate viewership, sometimes outpacing channel 4. In 2007, WSPA for the first time swept WYFF in evening news, and it had the most revenue of any local station in 2011 and 2014. By 2022, WYFF led the market again in all news ratings time slots, with WLOS and WSPA nearly tied in late news viewership.

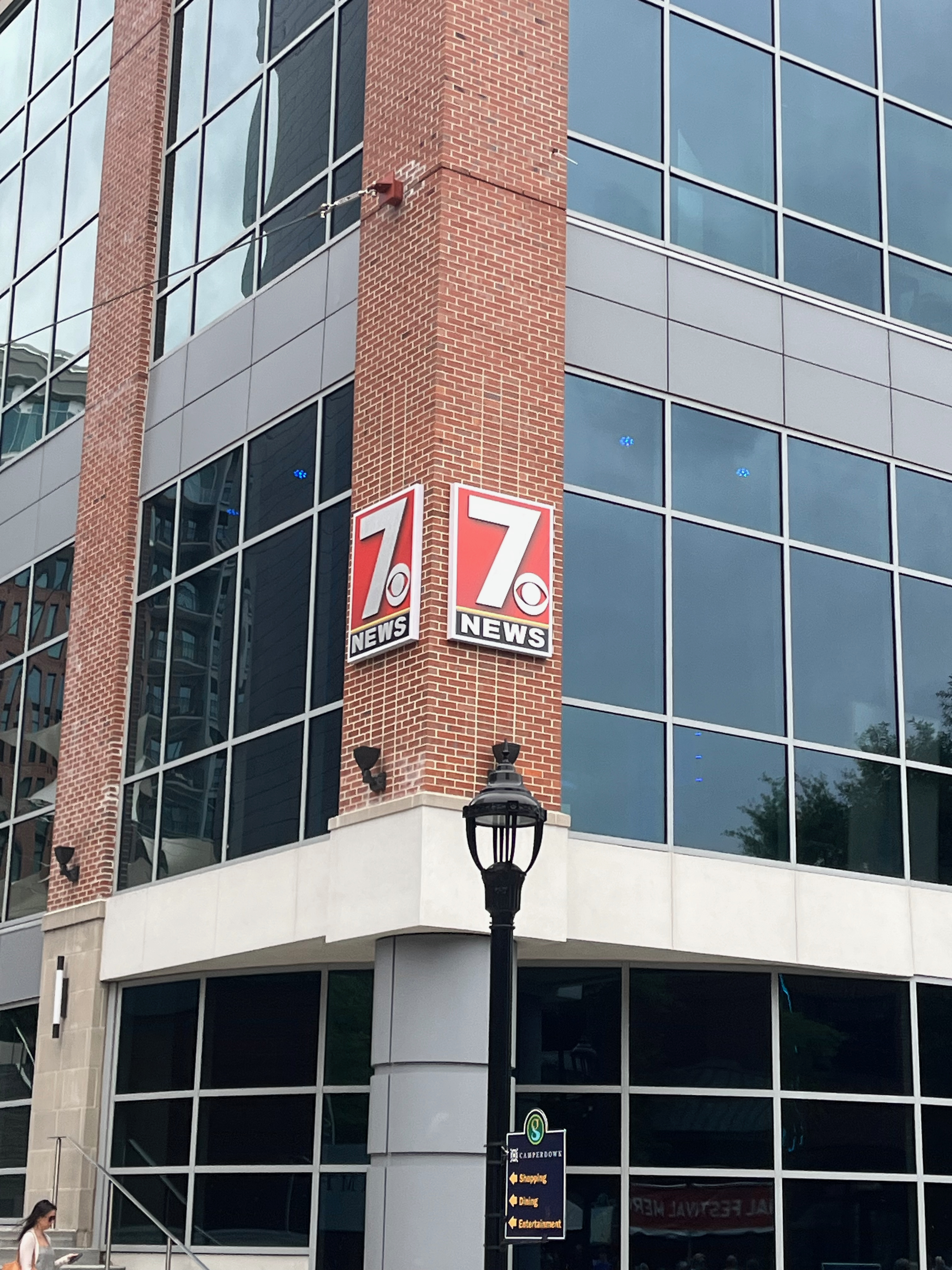
Greenville studio

WSPA-TV has operated several facilities in Greenville, the most recent a bureau and studio on Main Street that opened in 2017. The lifestyle show Your Carolina is presented from the Greenville studio.

From 1996 to 1999, WSPA-TV produced a 10 p.m. newscast for WHNS, which utilized WSPA's local reporting resources with a separate anchor lineup and was dropped when WHNS started an in-house news department. Since 2002, when a 10 p.m. newscast launched under the title The News on 62, WASV-TV/WYCW has aired newscasts from WSPA-TV. In 2022, the 10 p.m. newscast was extended to a full hour, joining the station's two-hour morning news extension from 7 to 9 a.m.

=== Notable former on-air staff ===
- Mike Gallagher — editorial commentator, 1992–1994
- Leeza Gibbons – anchor and reporter, 1978–1979
- Connie LeGrand – reporter and anchor, 1996–1999 and c. 2006
- Jane Robelot – anchor and reporter, 1983–1990
- Sibila Vargas – anchor, since 2016

== Technical information ==
=== Subchannels ===
The WSPA-TV/WYCW transmitter is on Hogback Mountain in northeastern Greenville County, South Carolina.

Subchannels of WSPA-TV and WYCW
| License | Subchannel | Res. | Short name | Programming |
|---|---|---|---|---|
| WSPA-TV | 7.1 | 1080i | WSPA-HD | The CW |
| WSPA-TV | 7.3 | 480i | ION | Ion |
| WSPA-TV | 40.2 | 480i | Charge! | Charge! (WMYA-TV) |
| WYCW | 62.1 | 1080i | WYCW-HD | Main WYCW programming |
| WYCW | 62.3 | 480i | REWIND | Rewind TV |

Broadcast on behalf of another station

=== Translators ===
WSPA-TV–WYCW's signal is additionally rebroadcast over the following translators, mostly in North Carolina:

- Cherokee, North Carolina: W08AT-D
- Spruce Pine, North Carolina: W08BF-D
- Sylva, North Carolina: W09AF-D
- Franklin, North Carolina: W09AG-D
- Montreat, North Carolina: W10AD-D
- Greenville, South Carolina: W10AJ-D
- Bryson City, North Carolina: W11AN-D
- Mars Hill, North Carolina: W15EL-D
- Weaverville, North Carolina: W18EP-D
- Marshall, North Carolina: W23ES-D
- Canton, North Carolina: W23EY-D
- Brevard, North Carolina: W32FI-D
- Beaver Dam, North Carolina: W35DT-D
