= WYFF =

Television station in Greenville, South Carolina

- Greenville–Spartanburg–; Anderson, South Carolina; Asheville, North Carolina; United States
- City: Greenville, South Carolina
- Channels: Digital: 30 (UHF); Virtual: 4
- Branding: WYFF 4; CBS Carolina (4.3) WYFF News 4

Programming
- Affiliations: 4.1: NBC; 4.3: CBS; for others, see § Technical information and subchannels

Ownership
- Owner: Hearst Television; (WYFF Hearst Television Inc.)

History
- First air date: December 31, 1953
- Former call signs: WFBC-TV (1953–1983)
- Former channel numbers: Analog: 4 (VHF, 1953–2009); Digital: 59 (UHF, 2002–2009), 36 (UHF, 2009–2019)
- Call sign meaning: "We're Your Friend Four" (former slogan)

Technical information
- Licensing authority: FCC
- Facility ID: 53905
- ERP: 1,000 kW
- HAAT: 597.9 m (1,961.6 ft)
- Transmitter coordinates: 35°6′43″N 82°36′23″W
- Translator(s): see § Translators

Links
- Public license information: Public file; LMS
- Website: www.wyff4.com

WYFF (channel 4) is a television station in Greenville, South Carolina, United States, serving Upstate South Carolina and Western North Carolina as an affiliate of NBC and CBS. Owned by Hearst Television, the station maintains studios on Rutherford Street (US 276) near downtown Greenville, and its transmitter is located near Caesars Head State Park in northwestern Greenville County.

Channel 4 went on the air as WFBC-TV on December 31, 1953. It was formed from a three-way merger of applicants for the channel, which included a consortium of local businessmen and two Greenville radio stations: WMRC, which left the air as a result, and WFBC, owned by The Greenville News and The Greenville Piedmont newspapers. This ownership group, which became Multimedia, Inc. in 1968, led the station to number one in the market.

Under pressure to divest itself of the cross-ownership of the News and Piedmont, Multimedia traded WFBC-TV to the Pulitzer Publishing Company in 1983, and the call letters were changed to WYFF. Under the ownership of Pulitzer and Hearst, which acquired Pulitzer's broadcasting properties in 1998, WYFF has typically remained the leader in the fragmented multi-city Greenville–Spartanburg–Asheville market. In 2026, a subchannel of WYFF became the market's CBS affiliate, replacing WSPA-TV (channel 7).

== History ==
=== WFBC-TV ===
Channel 4 was allocated to Greenville when the Federal Communications Commission (FCC) ended its multi-year freeze on TV station applications in April 1952. Prior to the freeze, in September 1948, the Greenville News-Piedmont Company, publisher of the local newspapers The Greenville News and The Greenville Piedmont and owner of radio station WFBC (1330 AM), had applied for channel 10. WFBC was one of three groups to apply for channel 4, along with Carolina Television, a group of local businessmen, as well as the Textile Broadcasting Company, owner of WMRC in Greenville. The three companies agreed to a merger under Carolina Television's application in July 1953; the combined firm took the name WMRC, Inc., and won the permit for channel 4. The merger led to the closure of WMRC on November 15, 1953; its management and staff moved to WFBC, and station WAKE took over its frequency and facilities.

After the merger, construction of WFBC-TV began in September 1953. The new station signed an affiliation contract with NBC and began building a transmitter site and interim studios on Paris Mountain. A test pattern was broadcast for the first time on December 26, and WFBC-TV signed on at 11:30 p.m. on December 31, 1953—in time to carry the ball drop from Times Square to ring in 1954. Shortly after, at the direction of station manager Wilson Wearn, the station produced a live remote broadcast of a basketball game between Furman University and Newberry College on February 13, 1954—its first live local sports broadcast. That night, Frank Selvy of Furman scored 100 points, setting a college basketball milestone. The studios and transmitter both left Paris Mountain within five years. WFBC radio and television moved in April 1955 to a new 25,000-square-foot (2,300 m^{2}) facility on Rutherford Street, near what were then Greenville's city limits. In 1958, channel 4 began broadcasting from Caesar's Head, expanding coverage and eliminating multipath interference in the city of Greenville.

In its early years, channel 4 was recognized for a variety of children's programs, including Kids Korral, Romper Room, and especially Monty's Rascals, which aired under that title from 1960 to 1978. Hosted by Monty DuPuy, who had come to WFBC-TV from the radio station, and Stowe Hoyle, the show featured a live children's audience. After DuPuy left Rascals, the show continued as Rascal's Clubhouse until 1982.

The News-Piedmont Company expanded its broadcasting interests beyond Greenville when it acquired WBIR radio and television in Knoxville, Tennessee, in 1960, followed by WMAZ radio and television in Macon, Georgia, in 1962. On January 1, 1968, the WFBC, WBIR and WMAZ stations, as well as the News, Piedmont, and Citizen and Times in Asheville were reorganized as Multimedia, Inc.

In the 1970s, federal regulators took a new tenor toward cross-ownership of newspapers and broadcast stations—such as the News and Piedmont and the WFBC stations. In 1975, the FCC moved to bar future acquisitions that created cross-ownership and ordered 16 such groups in small markets to break up their holdings, though others were allowed to remain grandfathered. Two years later, on March 1, 1977, a federal appeals court amplified the policy; instead of merely barring future purchases against the rule, it ordered the divestiture of all such pairings except those that were in the public interest.

Within days, Multimedia announced an agreement with McClatchy designed to extricate both groups from their heaviest cross-ownership burdens. Where Multimedia owned the WFBC stations and two daily newspapers, McClatchy had a similar situation in Sacramento, California: it published The Sacramento Bee, owned KFBK and KFBK-FM radio, and owned KOVR, an ABC-affiliated TV station. McClatchy and Multimedia proposed a straight trade whereby the former would acquire WFBC-TV and Multimedia would receive KOVR; as a result, neither company would own a newspaper and a TV station in the same market. Petitions were lodged against the deal by organizations in Greenville and Sacramento, as well as the San Joaquin Communications Corporation. The former two groups emphasized the unfamiliarity of the companies to their new markets, calling McClatchy "totally foreign" to upstate South Carolina and Multimedia "completely unknown to the Sacramento community". The latter had been in a legal battle since 1974 seeking to wrest KMJ-TV in Fresno from McClatchy control. While the community organizations abandoned their opposition to the trade, San Joaquin Communications Corporation refused to yield, and the transaction reached its deadline date of March 1, 1978, without being adjudicated by the FCC. Negotiations to extend the term failed, and the deal was called off by mutual agreement later that month. During this time, a radio annex was built at the WFBC studios, separating the radio and television operations.

=== WYFF ===
In March 1981, Multimedia reached an agreement in principle to trade WFBC-TV and WXII-TV in Winston-Salem, North Carolina, to the Pulitzer Publishing Company in exchange for Pulitzer's flagship station, KSDK in St. Louis. As with the proposed KOVR-for-WFBC trade of 1977, the deal was designed to remove uncertainty around cross-ownership; Pulitzer published the St. Louis Post-Dispatch. It provided geographic diversity for both companies. Multimedia owned no stations west of the Mississippi River, and Pulitzer was seeking to reduce its dependence on the St. Louis economy. The transaction was filed with the FCC in December; Pulitzer had to sell a television station to remain within ownership limits and chose to spin off WLNE-TV in New Bedford, Massachusetts. The sale was approved in early 1983; as Multimedia retained the WFBC radio stations, channel 4 changed its call sign on March 2, 1983, to WYFF-TV ("We're Your Friend Four").

WYFF suffered a studio fire on June 23, 1985, after a battery short-circuited while being charged. The blaze caused $2.5 million in damage to equipment and set pieces, but the station did not miss a newscast; new equipment that had already been ordered and items loaned by other stations allowed WYFF to present its newscasts.

In 1998, Hearst-Argyle Television bought Pulitzer's entire television division, including WYFF-TV. In 2009, the Hearst Corporation acquired Argyle's stake in the venture, took it private, and renamed it Hearst Television.

A subchannel of WYFF assumed the CBS affiliation for the Greenville–Spartanburg–Asheville market from WSPA-TV on August 1, 2026. WYFF was one of four Hearst-owned stations receiving CBS from Nexstar Media Group–owned stations in their markets.

== News operation ==
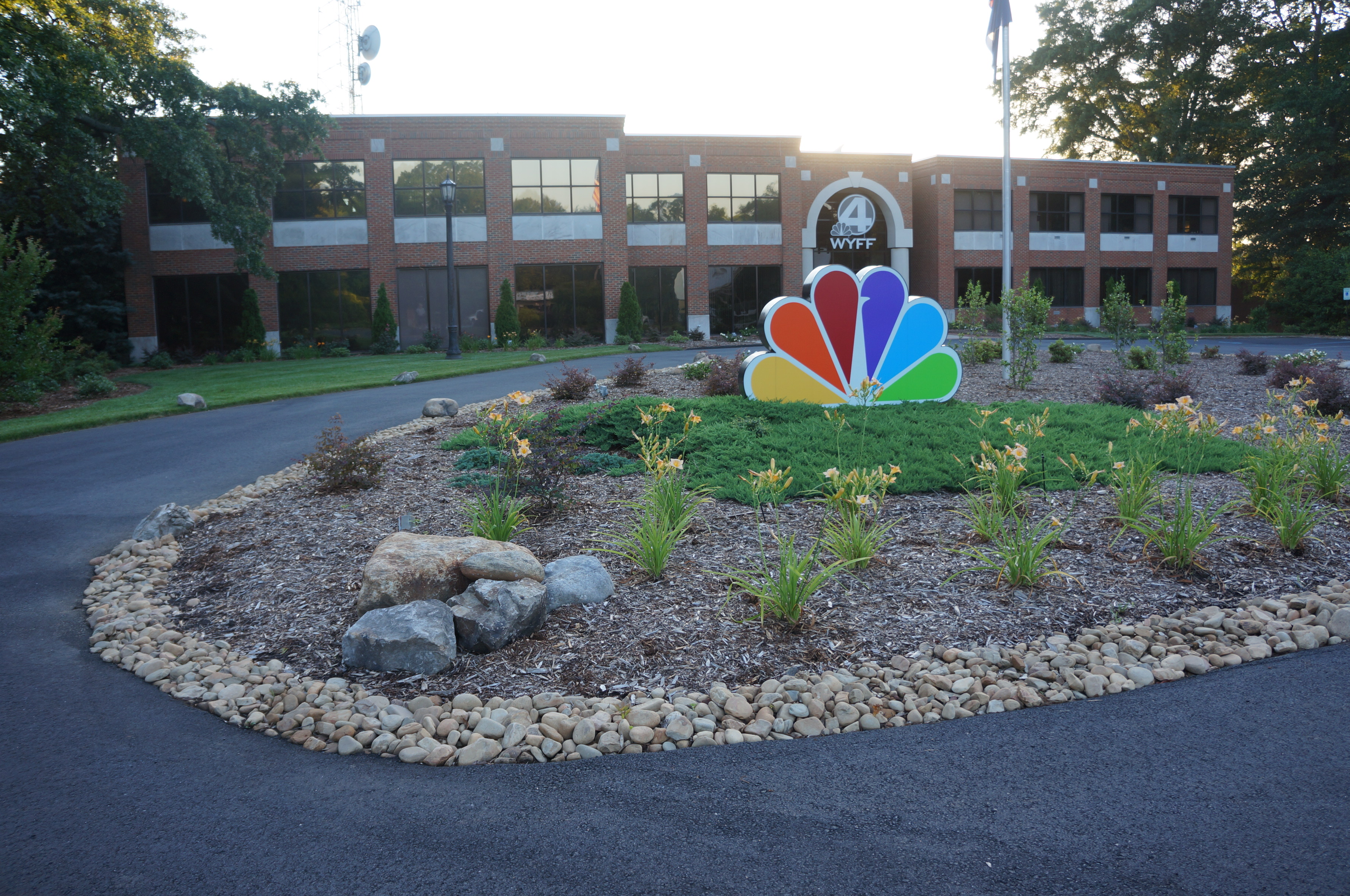
WYFF's studios on Rutherford Street in Greenville

WFBC-TV started producing newscasts on its first full day on air, January 1, 1954; Norvin Duncan, a 14-year veteran of the WFBC radio staff, was the first news anchor for channel 4. Jim Phillips answered a blind advertisement and was hired as WFBC-TV's sports director in 1968; the job included announcing Clemson Tigers athletics. Phillips left channel 4 in 1980 but continued with Clemson until his death in 2003, calling more than 2,000 sporting events.

In 1976, channel 4 extended its 30-minute early evening newscast to an hour, the only local station to air a full hour of evening news. The news department expanded in the 1990s, beginning with the introduction of a morning newscast in 1990. The hour-long evening news format persisted until 1994, when the station reorganized it into three half-hour evening newscasts between 5 and 6:30 p.m. During this time, two long-serving anchors joined WYFF. Carol Goldsmith—now Carol Clarke–began working at the station in 1985 and retired in 2025. In 1989, Michael Cogdill joined as a weekend anchor, rising to become the lead 6 and 11 p.m. anchor with Goldsmith in 1997; he retired in 2021 after 32 years.

Jane Robelot, a former anchor of CBS This Morning and graduate of Clemson University, returned to Greenville in 2007 and became a contributing reporter for WYFF, focusing on human interest stories. In 2009, the station started a local quarterly newsmagazine, Chronicle. The first edition, "Paul's Gift", centered on the organs donated by a dying man and how they saved three lives; it won a George Foster Peabody Award.

As in other multi-city markets, news viewership in the Greenville–Spartanburg–Asheville market has tended to be fragmented by city. Consequently, WYFF's news viewership has traditionally been strongest in and around Greenville, and its newscasts emphasize coverage of Upstate South Carolina. WYFF has traditionally been the leader in total news viewership in the market, with WSPA as its most common competitor, sometimes outpacing channel 4. By 2022, WYFF led the market in all news ratings time slots.

=== Notable former on-air staff ===
- J. D. Hayworth – sports anchor, 1981–1986
- Mike Seidel – meteorologist, 1984–1989

== Technical information and subchannels ==
WYFF broadcasts from a tower facility located near Caesars Head State Park in northwestern Greenville County. Its signal is multiplexed:

Subchannels of WYFF
Subchannel	Res.	Short name	Programming
4.1	1080i	WYFF-DT	NBC
4.2	480i	WYFF-ME	MeTV
4.3	720p	WYFFCBS	CBS
4.4	480i	STORY	Story Television
4.5	480i	HSN	HSN
40.1	480i	ROAR	Roar (WMYA-TV)
40.3	480i	COMET	Comet (WMYA-TV)

Subchannel broadcast with MPEG-4 video
Broadcast on behalf of another station

=== Analog-to-digital conversion ===
WYFF signed on its digital signal on May 1, 2002. The station ended regular programming on its analog signal, over VHF channel 4, on June 12, 2009, the official date on which full-power television stations in the United States transitioned from analog to digital broadcasts under federal mandate. The station's digital signal moved from its pre-transition UHF channel 59, which was among the high band UHF channels (52-69) that were removed from broadcasting use as a result of the transition, to UHF channel 36. As part of the SAFER Act, WYFF kept its analog signal on the air until July 12 to inform viewers of the digital television transition through a loop of public service announcements from the National Association of Broadcasters.

WYFF relocated its signal from channel 36 to channel 30 on September 6, 2019, as a result of the 2016 United States wireless spectrum auction.

=== Translators ===
WYFF operates eight digital translators across the rugged mountains of western North Carolina.

- Ela: W03AK-D
- Sylva, etc.: W04DW-D
- Bryson City: W05AR-D
- Franklin, etc.: W06AJ-D
- Burnsville: W07DS-D
- Tryon & Columbus: W07DT-D
- Cherokee, etc.: W10AL-D
- Canton, etc.: W10DF-D
