= Wyrd (disambiguation) =

Wyrd is a concept in Anglo-Saxon culture roughly corresponding to fate or personal destiny.

Wyrd may also refer to:

- Wyrd (band), a Finnish black metal band
- Wyrd (company), a miniatures company
- Wyrd (album), an album by the band Elvenking
- WYRD (AM), a radio station (1330 AM) licensed to Greenville, South Carolina, United States
- WYRD-FM, a radio station (98.9 FM) licensed to Spartanburg, South Carolina, United States
- WSPA-FM, a radio station (106.3 FM) licensed to Simpsonville, South Carolina, United States, which used the call sign WYRD-FM prior to March 2023
- Wyrd Con Interactive Theater convention, a LARPing con

== See also ==
- Weird (disambiguation)
