= List of 1939 affiliates of the NBC Red Network =

In 1939, The National Broadcasting Company's (NBC) Red and Blue radio networks competed with the Columbia Broadcasting System (CBS) and the Mutual Broadcasting System in providing nationwide coverage. NBC advertising rate cards of the period listed "basic" and "supplemental" affiliated stations. Advertisers were encouraged to buy time for their programs on the full "basic" line-up (plus any "supplemental" stations they wished) but this was open to negotiation. It was not unusual for Red Network advertisers to place shows on Blue Network stations in certain markets (and the other way around). Supplemental stations were generally located in smaller cities away from the network trunk lines. Such stations were usually offered to advertisers on both the Red and Blue Network line-ups.

== East affiliates ==
=== Basic ===
- WEAF (New York, New York)
- CBM (Montreal, Quebec, Canada)
- KYW (Philadelphia, Pennsylvania)
- WBEN (Buffalo, New York)
- WCAE (Pittsburgh, Pennsylvania)
- WCSH (Portland, Maine)
- WDEL (Wilmington, Delaware)
- WFBR (Baltimore, Maryland)
- WGY (Schenectady. New York)
- WJAR (Providence, Rhode Island)
- WNAC (Boston, Massachusetts)
- WRC (Washington, D.C.)
- WTAG (Worcester, Massachusetts)
- WTAM (Cleveland, Ohio)
- WTIC (Hartford, Connecticut)
- WWJ (Detroit, Michigan)

=== Supplemental ===
- CBF (Montreal, Quebec, Canada)
- CBL (Toronto, Ontario, Canada)
- CMQ (Havana, Cuba)
- WBRE (Wilkes-Barre, Pennsylvania)
- WCOL (Columbus, Ohio)
- WEEU (Reading, Pennsylvania)
- WFEA (Manchester, New Hampshire)
- WGAL (Lancaster, Pennsylvania)
- WLBZ (Bangor, Maine)
- WLW (Cincinnati, Ohio)
- WNBC (New Britain, Connecticut)
- WORK (York, Pennsylvania)
- WRAW (Reading, Pennsylvania)
- WRDO (Augusta, Maine)
- WSAN (Allentown, Pennsylvania)
- WSPD (Toledo, Ohio)

== Midwest affiliates ==
=== Basic ===
- KSD (St. Louis, Missouri)
- KSTP (St. Paul, Minnesota)
- WDAF (Kansas City, Missouri)
- WHO (Des Moines, Iowa)
- WIRE (Indianapolis, Indiana)
- WMAQ (Chicago, Illinois)
- WOC (Davenport, Iowa)
- WOW (Omaha, Nebraska)

=== Supplemental ===
- KANS (Wichita, Kansas)
- KFYR (Bismarck, North Dakota)
- KGBX (Springfield, Missouri)
- KOAM (Pittsburg, Kansas)
- KSOO (Sioux Falls, Iowa)
- WBOW (Terre Haute, Indiana)
- WCFL (Chicago, Illinois)
- WCKY (Cincinnati, Ohio)
- WDAY (Fargo, North Dakota)
- WEBC (Duluth, Minnesota)
- WGBF (Evansville, Indiana)
- WGL (Fort Wayne, Indiana)
- WIBA (Madison, Wisconsin)
- WOOD (Grand Rapids, Michigan)
- WTMJ (Milwaukee, Wisconsin)
- XEW (Mexico City, Mexico)

== South affiliates ==
=== Basic ===
- KPRC (Houston, Texas)
- WBRC (Birmingham, Alabama)
- WJDX (Jackson, Mississippi)
- WMBG (Richmond, Virginia)
- WMC (Memphis, Tennessee)
- WSB (Atlanta, Georgia)
- WDSU (New Orleans, Louisiana)

=== Supplemental ===
- KARK (Little Rock, Arkansas)
- KFDM (Beaumont, Texas)
- KGKO (Fort Worth, Texas)
- KGNO (Dodge City, Kansas)
- KGRV (Weslaco, Texas)
- KRIS (Corpus Christi, Texas)
- KTHS (Hot Springs, Arkansas)
- KTOK (Oklahoma City, Oklahoma)
- KTSM (El Paso, Texas)
- KVOO (Tulsa, Oklahoma)
- WAPO (Chattanooga, Tennessee)
- WALA (Mobile, Alabama)
- WAVE (Louisville, Kentucky)
- WBAP (Fort Worth, Texas)
- WCSC (Charleston, South Carolina)
- WCRS (Greenwood, South Carolina)
- WFAA (Dallas, Texas)
- WFBC (Greenville, South Carolina)
- WFLA-WSUN (Tampa, Florida)
- WIOD (Miami, Florida)
- WIS (Columbia, South Carolina)
- WJAX (Jacksonville, Florida)
- WKY (Oklahoma City, Oklahoma)
- WLAK (Lakeland, Florida)
- WOAI (San Antonio, Texas)
- WPTF (Raleigh, North Carolina)
- WROL (Knoxville, Tennessee)
- WSM (Nashville, Tennessee)
- WSOC (Charlotte, North Carolina)
- WTAR (Norfolk, Virginia)
- WWNC (Asheville, North Carolina)

== Mountain affiliates ==
=== Basic ===
- KDYL (Salt Lake City, Utah)
- KOA (Denver, Colorado)

=== Supplemental ===
- KGHF (Pueblo, Colorado)
- KGIR (Butte, Montana)
- KIDO (Boise, Idaho)
- KOB (Albuquerque, New Mexico)
- KPFA (Helena, Montana)
- KSEI (Pocatello, Idaho)
- KTAR (Phoenix, Arizona)
- KTFI (Twin Falls, Idaho)
- KVOA (Tucson, Arizona)

== Pacific affiliates ==
=== Basic ===
- KFI (Los Angeles, California)
- KGW (Portland, Oregon)
- KHQ (Spokane, Washington)
- KOMO (Seattle, Washington)
- KPO (San Francisco, California)

=== Supplemental ===
- KERN (Bakersfield, California)
- KFBK (Sacramento, California)
- KGU (Honolulu, Hawaii)
- KGW (Portland, Oregon)
- KMED (Medford, Oregon)
- KMJ (Fresno, California)
- KWG (Stockton, California)

== See also ==
- List of affiliates of the NBC Blue Network
