= WBBO (disambiguation) =

WBBO is a radio station (98.5 FM) licensed to Ocean Acres, New Jersey.

WBBO may also refer to:

- WWOL, a radio station (780 AM) licensed to Forest City, North Carolina, which held the call sign WBBO from 1947 to 1990
- WTPT, a radio station (93.3 FM) licensed to Forest City, North Carolina, which held the call sign WBBO-FM from 1947 to 1994
- WTHJ, a radio station (106.5 FM) licensed to Bass River Township, New Jersey, which held the call sign WBBO from 2006 to 2010
