= WGVL (TV) =

Television station in Greenville, South Carolina (1953–1956)

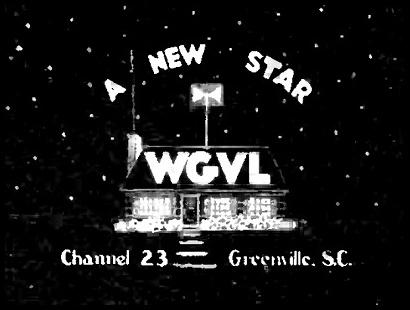
- Greenville, South Carolina; United States
- Channels: Analog: 23 (UHF)

Programming
- Affiliations: ABC (1953–1956); NBC (August–December 1953); DuMont (1953–1956); CBS (1955–1956)

Ownership
- Owner: Greenville Television Company

History
- First air date: August 1, 1953
- Last air date: April 29, 1956
- Call sign meaning: Greenville

Technical information
- ERP: 17 kW
- HAAT: 345 m (1,133 ft)
- Transmitter coordinates: 34°56′31″N 82°24′41″W

WGVL (channel 23) was a television station in Greenville, South Carolina, United States, which broadcast from 1953 to 1956. The station was the first to operate in Greenville, but like many early ultra high frequency (UHF) stations, the arrival of new stations on the very high frequency (VHF) band imperiled its ability to secure programming and viewers. WGVL signed off the day that WSPA-TV signed on channel 7, having fought for years alongside fellow UHF station WAIM-TV in Anderson to prevent the television station from being built; the case lingered into 1960, well after the station ceased broadcasting.

== History ==
WGVL signed on August 1, 1953, under the ownership of the Greenville Television Company; the station's first network program was a baseball game from ABC, aired after opening ceremonies at its studios in Calhoun Towers. WGVL's transmitter site and tower were the former WMRC-FM plant on Paris Mountain. In its first months of operation, channel 23 was an affiliate of ABC, NBC and DuMont; the NBC affiliation would be lost when Greenville's first VHF station, WFBC-TV (channel 4), signed on the air at the start of 1954.

The station's existence, however, turned into a struggle for survival that played out in the courts for almost all of its existence. The Spartan Radiocasting Company of Spartanburg, which owned two radio stations there (originally WORD and WDXY-FM, later sold to buy WSPA-AM-FM) had a construction permit for a second VHF station, to broadcast on channel 7. The Spartan TV station was originally approved to broadcast from Hogback Mountain, closer to Spartanburg, but sought to move to Paris Mountain, which was then home of WFBC-TV and WGVL and closer to Greenville. For Spartan, this was a necessary condition of obtaining the CBS television affiliation for channel 7; CBS felt a station operating from Hogback would encroach on WBTV in Charlotte, North Carolina. By March 1954, WGVL had already lost $75,000; at that time, its petition to deny the Spartan move to Paris Mountain was denied by the Federal Communications Commission (FCC), as had been petitions from WAIM-TV (channel 40) in Anderson and the Sterling Telecasting Company of Spartanburg, which held the construction permit for WSCV (channel 17) in that city.

WGVL and WAIM took the case to the United States Court of Appeals for the D.C. Circuit, seeking injunctive relief from the FCC ruling, in the summer of 1954. Despite the legal fight it was facing, by the fall of 1954 WGVL-TV had increased its broadcast hours, signing on for three hours in the morning and six hours in the evening on weekdays plus extended weekend operating hours.

On January 31, 1955, the appeals court heard arguments by WGVL and WAIM against the WSPA-TV authorization on Paris Mountain, having obtained six months prior a restraining order preventing Spartan from building its transmitter facility until the case was heard (though the studios were near completion and initial preparations had been made on Paris Mountain). While WGVL and WAIM-TV claimed that the FCC should not have granted the application without giving them a hearing, the commission argued that they did not have standing to show injury that would be caused by WSPA-TV going on air, and that the procedure the stations sought to use was the improper forum to delay such a grant. WGVL's stakes became even higher when—even though WSPA-TV had already secured a CBS affiliation for when it would sign on—the network affiliated with WGVL in the fall of 1955, with ABC and DuMont programs continuing to air.

Even though WGVL and WAIM won a hearing at the FCC, the hearing examiner's recommendation would not be favorable to them. Examiner James D. Cunningham recommended the FCC approve the WSPA-TV move to Paris Mountain, saying that the UHF stations "failed to make a satisfactory showing" as to the economic damages they would incur and that, because UHF converters were widely distributed in their broadcast areas, they would not be at a disadvantage. WGVL and WAIM counsel asked for oral argument on the decision, warning that it would be "aggravating the forces now making for unequal competition in the television field and hastening the trend towards complete obliteration of UHF".

The FCC made a final decision in favor of Spartan on March 9, 1956, reaffirming many of the arguments made by the hearing examiner. When the appeals court gave its approval for WSPA-TV, WGVL and WAIM announced their intentions to leave the air. On Sunday, April 29, 1956, WSPA-TV signed on; the night before, WGVL-TV announced that Sunday would be their final day of telecasting, beginning a silence that would last at least 60 days, if not longer.

The WGVL and WAIM appeals were heard in June 1956; the appeals court found that the FCC had erred in approving the Paris Mountain move for WSPA-TV and threw the case back to the FCC. The commission reaffirmed the grant yet again in 1957, saying that what misrepresentations about loss of service that WSPA had made in its filing were more than compensated for by the service provided to new areas, and that there was no intent to deceive on WSPA's part. WGVL and WAIM won again at the appeals court, which in 1958 ordered the record reopened because it did not find the misrepresentations excusable and said the FCC failed to justify the losses of service. The UHF stations also charged that Senator Strom Thurmond and former governor James F. Byrnes were appealed to by Spartan's Walter Brown to plead the company's case with FCC commissioners. WGVL finally withdrew from the proceedings on February 23, 1960, having never returned to the air.
