= WESC (disambiguation) =

WESC is a Swedish clothing brand.

WESC can also refer to:

- Women's Emergency Signalling Corps, an Australian organization
- WESC (AM), an AM radio station licensed to Greenville, South Carolina
- WESC-FM, a country music radio station licensed to Greenville, South Carolina
- World Extreme Skiing Championship, an extreme skiing competition
- Wisconsin Entertainment and Sports Center, the working title for Fiserv Forum, a multi-purpose arena in Milwaukee, Wisconsin
