= WFBC =

The call sign WFBC could refer to one of four broadcast stations in South Carolina:

- WFBC-FM, a radio station broadcasting at 93.7 MHz on the FM band, licensed to Greenville.
- WYRD (AM), a radio station broadcasting at 1330 kHz on the AM band, licensed to Greenville, which held the call sign WFBC until 1997.
- WYFF, a television station broadcasting on channel 30 digital/4 PSIP, licensed to Greenville, which held the call sign WFBC-TV from 1953 to 1983.
- WMYA-TV, a television station broadcasting on channel 35 digital/40 PSIP, licensed to Anderson, which held the call sign WFBC-TV from 1995 to 1999.
