= WROO =

- Mauldin, South Carolina; United States
- Broadcast area: Upstate South Carolina
- Frequency: 104.9 MHz (HD Radio)
- Branding: 104.9 Fox Sports Upstate

Programming
- Format: Sports
- Affiliations: Fox Sports Radio; Charlotte FC

Ownership
- Owner: iHeartMedia, Inc.; (iHM Licenses, LLC)
- Sister stations: WESC, WESC-FM, WGVL, WMYI, WSSL-FM

History
- First air date: April 28, 1965 (as WCRS-FM at 96.7)
- Former call signs: WCRS-FM (1965–2001); WPEK (2001–2002); WBZT-FM (2002–2009)
- Former frequencies: 96.7 MHz (1965–2014)

Technical information
- Licensing authority: FCC
- Facility ID: 25240
- Class: C3
- ERP: 2,300 watts
- HAAT: 288 meters (945 ft)
- Transmitter coordinates: 34°55′16.00″N 82°24′5.00″W

Links
- Public license information: Public file; LMS
- Webcast: Listen Live
- Website: 1049foxsports.iheart.com

WROO (104.9 FM) is a sports radio station licensed to Mauldin, South Carolina, and serves the Upstate, including Greater Greenville and some of Spartanburg. The iHeartMedia, Inc. outlet is licensed by the U.S. Federal Communications Commission (FCC) to broadcast with an ERP of 2,300 watts. Its transmitter is located atop Paris Mountain in northern Greenville County, right above Greenville, where its studios are located downtown.

== History ==
The station originally signed on in Greenwood, South Carolina as WCRS-FM, sister to WCRS, on April 28, 1965. The station simulcasted its AM counterpart for a number of years, later carrying a Country format. The station was moved to the Greenville-Spartanburg market, licensed to Mauldin (but located on Paris Mountain in Greenville), in 2002 after being purchased by Clear Channel Communications. The station's move to Mauldin allowed for sister station WLTY, also at 96.7, in nearby Columbia to upgrade its signal.

After signing on in the Greenville-Spartanburg market, WBZT-FM aired a rock music format under the name "96.7 The Buzzard" and slogan "Real Rock." The station was similar to Clear Channel's WVBZ in Greensboro, North Carolina when it was on 100.3 FM. It was the first station in South Carolina to broadcast in HD. Despite only signing on with 720 watts ERP, the station's antenna height still equated it to a class A FM; however, the signal only provided grade B coverage to portions of the Spartanburg County part of the market.

As "The Buzzard", 96.7 played mainly Rock music from the 1970s through 2000s. The station aired the syndicated morning show "The Bob and Tom Show" from its sign-on until April 2006. It was replaced with a music-intensive morning show. Towards the end of the station's run, it played all classic rock during the day and nineties and new rock at night.

The station, throughout its lifespan, faced serious competition from Barnstable Broadcasting (later Entercom Communications') WROQ and WTPT. On December 23, 2007, after modest performance from the rock format for over five years, the station entered 'stunt mode', urging listeners to tune in for a new format on December 25, 2007 (Christmas Day). The new format was a Christian CHR format called "Shine 96.7" with "Positive Hits", which was aimed at a younger audience than other stations in the market such as WLFJ. The station eventually switched to a satellite-fed Christian AC format from Salem Communications. In the fall of 2008, Shine 96.7 was the exclusive outlet in the area for USC Gamecocks sports. In September 2009, the station simulcasted shortly with sister station WGVL.

On September 17, 2009, the station changed its call sign from WBZT-FM to WROO.

On September 12, 2012, WROO dropped its Christian contemporary format and began stunting with various types of music and liners taking jabs at other radio stations in the Greenville-Spartanburg market. The station's website featured a splash page with a goodbye message, redirecting displaced listeners to WLFJ-FM, "His Radio 89.3." The following day, WROO became a classic rock format as "96.7 The Road".

On July 28, 2014, the station moved to 104.9 FM and increased its power slightly from 700 to 720 watts, and increasing from a class A to class C3 FM station.

On September 4, 2015, WROO rebranded as "Real Rock 104.9", slightly altering their classic rock format, which, with the move, began focusing more towards 80s/90s rock. This format is once again similar to WVBZ.

On September 10, 2021, iHeart announced that WROO would flip to sports talk as "Fox Sports 104.9", carrying programming from, as the name suggests, Fox Sports Radio, on the 13th. With the move, the rock format continued running, but is completely jockless and is backed with liners hyping "the new sound of sports in the Upstate" ahead of the relaunch, most of such liners also using the Fox Sports music bed as background music.

== Previous logo ==
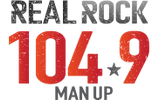
