= WGVL =

Radio station in Greenville, South Carolina

- Greenville, South Carolina; United States
- Broadcast area: Upstate South Carolina
- Frequency: 1440 kHz
- Branding: Greenville's BIN 1440

Programming
- Format: Black-oriented news
- Affiliations: Black Information Network

Ownership
- Owner: iHeartMedia, Inc.; (iHM Licenses, LLC)
- Sister stations: WESC, WESC-FM, WMYI, WROO, WSSL-FM

History
- First air date: September 22, 1940; 85 years ago
- Former call signs: WMRC (1940–1954); WAKE (1954–1955); WQOK (1955–1982); WGVL (1982–1984); WSSL (1984–1985); WGSL (1985–1986); WSSL (1986–1995)
- Call sign meaning: Greenville

Technical information
- Licensing authority: FCC
- Facility ID: 59821
- Class: B
- Power: 5,000 watts
- Transmitter coordinates: 34°52′7.4″N 82°28′6.4″W

Links
- Public license information: Public file; LMS
- Webcast: Listen live
- Website: greenville.binnews.com

WGVL (1440 AM) is a radio station licensed to Greenville, South Carolina. It is owned and operated by iHeartMedia, Inc. The station serves as Greenville's Black Information Network affiliate.

== History ==
=== WMRC ===
WMRC signed on at 1500 kHz on September 22, 1940, under the ownership of the Textile Broadcasting Company. The Mutual Broadcasting System affiliate moved to 1490 kHz with NARBA in 1941 and to 1440 in 1949, giving it a power increase to 5,000 watts. Jolley was the local Royal Crown Cola bottler, and the WMRC call letters stood for "We Make Royal Crown". WMRC targeted local textile communities through southern gospel, World Transcription Library programs, and live country through Mutual. WMRC's popularity began to increase via morning man Sid Tear, news reporter Martin Agronski, and Meeting House in Dixie, one of its first religious programs.

When the ban on phonograph records ended, popular local personalities began to emerge, like Bob Poole with "Poole's Party Line," and Frank Cope with "The Ole Lazy Man Show." Local university football games, Saturday afternoon's "The Metropolitan Opera," and the weekday special "The Breakfast Club" with Don McNeill were huge hits.

1953 was a year of change for WMRC. The station, which had changed networks to ABC and now had an outlet at 94.9 FM, shut down the FM outlet (whose Paris Mountain transmitter site was used to start WGVL TV channel 23 that August). However, Textile Broadcasting had its own television plans. When the Carolina, Blue Ridge and Textile Broadcasting Companies merged, the station went off the air: the new company was WFBC, Inc., and WFBC radio and television absorbed WMRC's staff. The merger took effect on November 15, 1953.

1440 AM was off the air until the sale to the Piedmont Broadcasting Company was completed at 5:45 p.m. on February 7, 1954. At that time, station WAKE, which had started up in 1950 after WMRC's frequency change, moved its operation from 1490 to 1440 (and a new licensee took over 1490 as WMRB), upgrading from 250 to 5,000 watts in the process. WAKE was a CBS affiliate.

=== WQOK ===
On July 4, 1955, WAKE changed its call letters to WQOK, relaunching under the management of R. W. Rounsaville; in 1957, Dick Broadcasting—which also owned stations in Chattanooga and Knoxville—purchased WQOK from Speidel-Fisher Broadcasting, which had earlier in the year bought out the other interests in Piedmont. In 1958, WQOK became a Top 40 station programmed by veteran Greenville radio programmer Jerry Mosteller (1922–2013).

The station quickly became number one in the market with an endless stream of "rock and roll" as well as "rhythm and blues" music broadcast from the "Four Towers Of Power" on White Horse Road. WQOK found its place in Greenville's radio market with many business in the Upstate area advertising on "1440 Greenville". WQOK, often known as "The Big Q", was one of the first stations in the area to use fast talking, big voiced disc jockeys that would introduce the records with "jive talk" and take telephone requests from the listeners. The station also did live remotes for personal connections with its listeners.

WQOK had a stable of popular DJs from 1958 through the late 1960s. Personalities such as Ken Dee (Dockins), Lake Cely, John Hudson, Sonny Epps, Bo Sanders, Carl Stubbs, Mal Harrison, Lee Sims, Paul Gold, Wayne Seal (later to become Governor Robert McNair's press secretary), Rick Fight, Dan Ellis, Charlie "Byrd" Lindsey, "Wild" Bill West, Noel Belue, Andy Rector, Mike Jones, Jack Kirby (aka Milton Bagby), Teddy Vee (aka Ted Vigodsky), Don "Happy Hearts" Bagwell, Little Davey Dee (aka Dave Dannheisser), Jim McAlister, Pete Dawley, Dave Wild (aka Dave Scott at other stations and Scott Studios) and Eston Johnson. Bill Hudson, a mid-day DJ, was also program director in the mid 1960s.

The station was popular with the younger demographics (12-24). In one survey in 1961, (Pulse, Spring 1961), Ken Dee (Dockins) had 62% of the total radio audience during his afternoon show. Noel Belue's morning show in 1961 captured 40% of Greenville's total radio audience. Rick Fight's "Crazy" afternoon show in 1959 had 55% (Pulse, Spring 1959) of the Greenville radio audience. Rick later moved to Greenville station WFBC, when management there made him a better offer, due to his popularity at 1440 WQOK.

The station used many jingles for weather, news, the time of day and DJ identification. These were played with the sounds of happy voices, honking horns and guitars twanging. The lyrics to one of the early jingles read:

The best sound in town on radio,
Is W-Q-O-K, one- four- four-, oh,
Exciting listening, take your "Q"
For Music and News designed just for you,
It's W-Q-O-K, Greenville for your
Hot Top Forty Radio....

T.C. Hooper purchased WQOK from Dick Broadcasting in 1968. For many years, into the early 1980s, WQOK remained one of Greenville's top stations. It was Greenville's "Top 40" station for 25 years and kept the same basic format. However, as FM slowly took over the majority of radio listenership, WQOK went dark in the early 1980s. Among the former announcers at the station prior to its demise are: Lee Nolan, Gary Jackson, Lee Alexander, Russ Cassell, Steve Chris, Dan Stevens, Kenny Bridwell, Jay (Weekend) Michaels, Teddy "Vee" Vigodsky, Davey "Dee" Dannheisser, Chris Scott, John Foster (Dr. John) Brother Bill, Lisa Rollins and Kirby Stevens (who broadcast for 60 hours for the Heart Association).

=== WGVL ===
1440 WQOK turned off its transmitters after playing American Pie by Don McLean for a brief while and was sold to Key Market Broadcasting, owner of WSSL-FM, and Kirby Confer in 1982. It was then simulcast with sister station WGVL-FM, now WSSL-FM.

WGVL was purchased by Clear Channel Communications, along with country music simulcast partner WSSL-FM, in 1999. WGVL became the Greenville market's first Spanish station on July 11, 1999. Other formats considered, according to Bill McMartin of AMFM, were Radio Disney and sports talk. The station broadcast a wide range of Spanish music. The styles of music ranged from "hot Latin pop" such as Ricky Martin and Jennifer Lopez to salsa, merengue, Colombian tropical, Mexican and vallenato, with ballads, boleros and tangos at night. WGVL also aired news and sports programming, including soccer. Program director Carlos Garcia, a Colombia native, made sure that many cultures were served, not just one. Eventually, the station was leased in a local marketing agreement to various Spanish broadcasters.

On September 1, 2009, the station changed format from "La Invasora" and Spanish music and began simulcasting Shine 96.7 WROO's Christian contemporary format, ending the local marketing agreement and putting the station back in the hands of Clear Channel Communications. Afterwards, the simulcast was discontinued, and 1440 began airing programming from ESPN Radio, being leased by Greenville Radio Group, LLC and operated by veteran broadcaster Greg McKinney, who had previously programmed AC stations WSPA-FM and WMYI in the market. In November 2009, WGVL opened newly built studios in Greenville, SC. The station had a programming agreement with ESPN Radio, and aired the network's lineup of Mike and Mike in the Morning, Colin Cowherd, and Scott Van Pelt. Weekday afternoons, 4 p.m.-6 p.m., WGVL aired The Score Radio Show, featuring local sports personalities Will Merritt, George Rogers, Will Bouton, and others. On weekday evenings from 6 p.m.-8 p.m., the station presented Phil Kornblut's Sportstalk.

Logo as a Fox Sports Radio affiliate

In late 2011, the LMA with Greenville Radio Group ended for unknown reasons, and Clear Channel took control of the station once again. Clear Channel retained the ESPN Radio programming and program schedule that had been broadcast on 1440. Late in 2012, WGVL switched to Fox Sports Radio.

On June 29, 2020, fifteen iHeart stations in markets with large African American populations, including WGVL, began stunting with African American speeches, interspersed with messages such as "Our Voices Will Be Heard" and "Our side of the story is about to be told," with a new format slated to launch on June 30. That day, WGVL, along with the other fourteen stations, became the launch stations for the Black Information Network, an African American-oriented all-news network.
