= WSPA-FM =

- Simpsonville, South Carolina; United States
- Broadcast area: Upstate South Carolina
- Frequency: 106.3 MHz
- Branding: La Raza 106.3

Programming
- Language: Spanish
- Format: Regional Mexican

Ownership
- Owner: Norsan Media; (Norsan Media LLC)
- Sister stations: WOLI

History
- First air date: July 10, 1989
- Former call signs: WNMX (1988–1995); WDXZ (1995–1999); WGVC (1999–2008); WYRD-FM (2008–2023)
- Call sign meaning: "Watch Spartanburg Push Ahead"

Technical information
- Licensing authority: FCC
- Facility ID: 53623
- Class: C3
- ERP: 25,000 watts
- HAAT: 100 meters (330 ft)
- Transmitter coordinates: 34°50′33.4″N 82°09′58.4″W

Links
- Public license information: Public file; LMS
- Website: larazalaraza.com/greenville/

WSPA-FM (106.3 MHz) is a Regional Mexican-formatted radio station in the Greenville-Spartanburg area of Upstate South Carolina. The Norsan Media outlet is licensed by the Federal Communications Commission to Simpsonville, South Carolina, and broadcasts at with an ERP of 25 kW. Its studios are in Greenville and its transmitter is located east of Five Forks.

== History ==
It was reported in late 1990 that Tony Brooks, owner of WORD (AM) from 1970 to 1982, Linda Brooks and Polly Davis formed a partnership to buy WNMX Mix 106.3 in Newberry, which planned to increase its power to 25,000 watts, giving the station a better signal in Greenville and Spartanburg Counties. Under Brooks the station became WDXZ. In December 1996, Caring in Action Inc. purchased WDXZ "Dixie 106.3", which had played country and adult contemporary, and switched it to Southern gospel. Special shows on Sundays included "Senior Saints" for senior citizens, "Kidz Now" with Sunday school for children, and "Call the Pastor", an advice show.

Art Sutton bought WDXZ, moved it to Greenville, and sold it to Barnstable Broadcast Group.

In September 2002, Barnstable changed WGVC-FM to a rhythmic oldies format described as "Greatest Hits of the '60s and '70s" and "Motown Soul & Rock & Roll." This was the first oldies station since WOLI and WOLT changed format two years earlier.

On March 21, 2005, Entercom announced its purchase of WGVC, WROQ and WTPT for $45 million from Barnstable. Entercom sold WSPA, WOLI and WOLT to Davidson Media Group and moved the Contemporary Christian format called "The Walk" from those stations to WGVC. The company also owned WSPA-FM, WYRD and WORD.

In late November 2006, a computerized “countdown” (including various phrases and quotes from entertainment, pop culture, and history were played every 30 seconds) broadcast on 106.3, which ran for almost one week, counting down until a new station would sign on 106.3 on a Thursday at 6am. The new format was GreenStone Media's female-oriented talk, known only as “106.3 WGVC”, which was one of only 11 stations in the country to carry the format backed by Jane Fonda and Gloria Steinem.

GreenStone Media, the main provider for WGVC's programming, would cease operations on August 17, 2007. On August 18, the station started playing a feed of various genres music, including rock from the 1970s and 1980s ("106.3 The Big Hair"), boy band music ("Backstreet 106.3"), a mix of rap and hip-hop, leaning towards old school rap ("Booty 106.3"), country ("Cryin’ County 106.3"), and even Christmas music ("Santa 106.3"). On August 20, 2007, at 12:00 noon ET, the station's new format was revealed to be adult hits under the name "106.3 Charlie FM".

On June 13, 2008, WGVC became WYRD-FM, a second simulcast partner to WYRD and WORD, "News Radio WORD". The talk radio format included local hosts Russ Cassell and Lisa Rollins as well as syndicated Mike Gallagher, Rush Limbaugh, Sean Hannity, George Noory and Jim Bohannon. The simulcast continued until the switch from talk to sports by the AM stations on March 29, 2014.

In November 2019, WYRD-FM began simulcasting on translator W270AM (101.5 FM) in Anderson. In May 2020, W236CD (95.1 FM) began serving Clemson, Pickens and Seneca.

Entercom became Audacy in 2021. On March 6, 2023, Audacy announced that WYRD-FM and WSPA-FM would swap formats and call signs beginning March 28. The move was intended to put WYRD-FM's programming on the larger 98.9 signal, a signal that reaches Asheville, North Carolina, while allowing WSPA-FM to maintain its focus on Greenville and Spartanburg counties on 106.3, along with the 101.5 and 95.1 translators in Anderson and Pickens counties, respectively. WSPA-FM's original format continued to be available in Asheville on 98.9's HD2 subchannel.

On March 15, 2024, as part of its exit plan from chapter 11 bankruptcy, Audacy announced that WSPA-FM would be placed in a divestiture trust led by station brokerage group Kalil & Co.’s Kalil Holding Group LLC in order to comply with Federal Communications Commission ownership limits, which now only allow the company to own four FM signals in the market due to a change in the number of signals in the Greenville-Spartanburg market; due to the bankruptcy, Audacy lost its previous grandfathered status in the market. On March 28 (exactly one year to the day after the "Magic" format had moved to the frequency), it was announced Norsan Media, which owned WOLI/W289BS in the market, would buy the station for $700,000, with the company assuming operation of WSPA-FM by a local marketing agreement on April 1.

At midnight on April 1, Norsan officially took over control as the "Magic 106.3" format moved exclusively to a stream on the Audacy app as well as WFBC-FM HD4 and WYRD-FM HD2, and their translators, with "You and Me" by Lifehouse being the final song to air over the air (being abruptly cut off near the end), and the station flipped to a simulcast of WOLI, airing a Regional Mexican format as "La Raza". Earlier in the day, "Magic" host Shorty paid tribute to the station’s history during his final show, including guest spots from former hosts including Lee Alexander and Sheri Taylor, the latter of whom had served as afternoon host from 2014 until exiting earlier in March. In addition, ahead of the move the station ran promotional sweepers redirecting listeners to WFBC-FM. The sale was consummated on July 9, 2024.
