= WPCI =

Radio station in Greenville, South Carolina

- Greenville, South Carolina; United States
- Broadcast area: Upstate South Carolina
- Frequency: 1490 kHz (HD Radio) C-QUAM AM stereo

Programming
- Format: Variety

Ownership
- Owner: Paper Cutters, Inc.

History
- First air date: 1950; 76 years ago
- Former call signs: WAKE (1950–1954); WMRB (1954–1982); WQOK (1982–1984)
- Call sign meaning: Paper Cutters Inc. (station's owner)

Technical information
- Licensing authority: FCC
- Facility ID: 51487
- Class: C
- Power: 1,000 watts
- Transmitter coordinates: 34°51′7.00″N 82°24′54.00″W

Links
- Public license information: Public file; LMS
- Webcast: Listen Live
- Website: www.papercuttersinc.com

WPCI (1490 AM) is a radio station located at 78 Mayberry Street in Greenville, South Carolina, United States, that features a format consisting of a variety of music from different genres. The station is licensed by the FCC to broadcast with a nominal power of 1 kW, full-time.

WPCI is owned and operated by local businessman Randy Mathena, and the programming consists entirely of selections from his extensive record collection stored on hard drive. Selections are played automatically and there are no disc jockeys, no song or artist identifications, and no commercials. The station broadcasts the minimum number of station identifications permitted by law. Musical content includes, but is not limited to, classic rhythm-and-blues, reggae, blues, country, folk, and spoken-word recordings. The station is sometimes affectionately referred to as "Radio Randy."

== History ==
WAKE hit the air in 1950 as the second 1490 station in Greenville; the first, WMRC, had moved from 1490 to 1440 in 1949. "Wake Up with Wake" drew 40 to 50 million listeners via "The Major League Game of the Day" with the voice of Bob Fulton, the announcer for the Carolina Gamecocks. In November 1953, WMRC and WFBC at 1330 merged; WAKE bought the 1440 license, and president Frank Cope, morning personality Bob Poole, and program director Bill Arrington, who had all been employed at WMRC, bought the 1490 frequency that WAKE vacated. The newly purchased station, with the financial backing of the Simpson partner of Belk-Simpson Dept. Stores, was renamed WMRB with the call letters from "We Make Radio Better". Launching on February 8, 1954, WMRB picked up the Mutual and ABC programs unheard in Greenville since the WMRC-WFBC merger, along with Furman sports, easy listening music, big band music, and in the later years, more popular tunes.

In the mid-1950s, WMRB became the host to South Carolina Gamecocks football, and Frank Cope purchased the rights to broadcast "The Masters Golf Tournament" originating in Augusta, Georgia. WMRB also became host to Chicago White Sox baseball broadcasts. This unique event began when Frank Cope and a local business associate from Household Finance brokered the arrangement with the Chicago White Sox. The corporate headquarters for Household Finance was located in Chicago and they were key sponsors on the White Sox Radio Network. Some local listeners falsely conjectured the Chicago White Sox broadcasts were the result of Shoeless Joe Jackson's affiliation with the White Sox and his playing time with Brandon Mill of the Textile Baseball League. WMRB continued to carry Chicago White Sox broadcasts from their Calhoun Towers studio until the late 1960s. WMRB replaced the White Sox with the Atlanta Braves in the early 1970s.

Frank Cope sold the station in 1980 to an associate, Alton Finley. Finley changed the call letters to WQOK, replaced the format with rock and roll, and rhythm and blues, cancelled the CBS lineup, and rejoined with the Mutual Broadcasting System. WMRB in the end lost listeners and the station went dark in the early to mid-1980s. Randy Mathena purchased the station in 1987 and renamed it WPCI for Paper Cutters Inc., as his first station call letter choices, WMRB and WBCH were already taken.

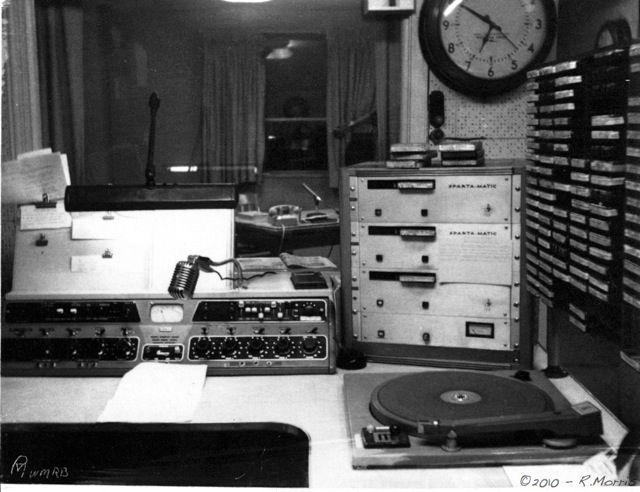
Broadcast console at WMRB.

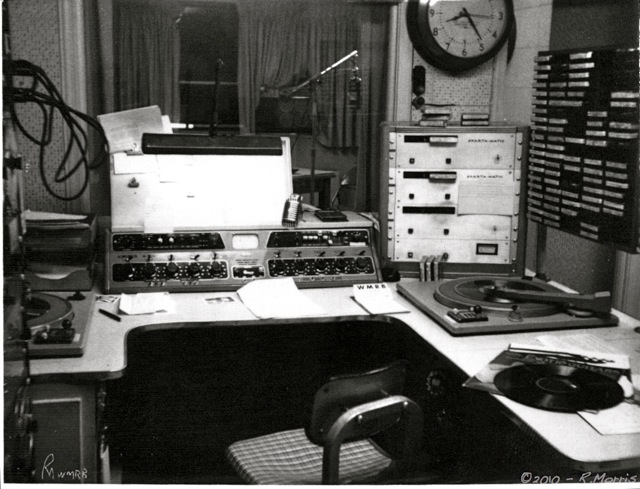
WMRB studio 1969 - Calhoun Towers.

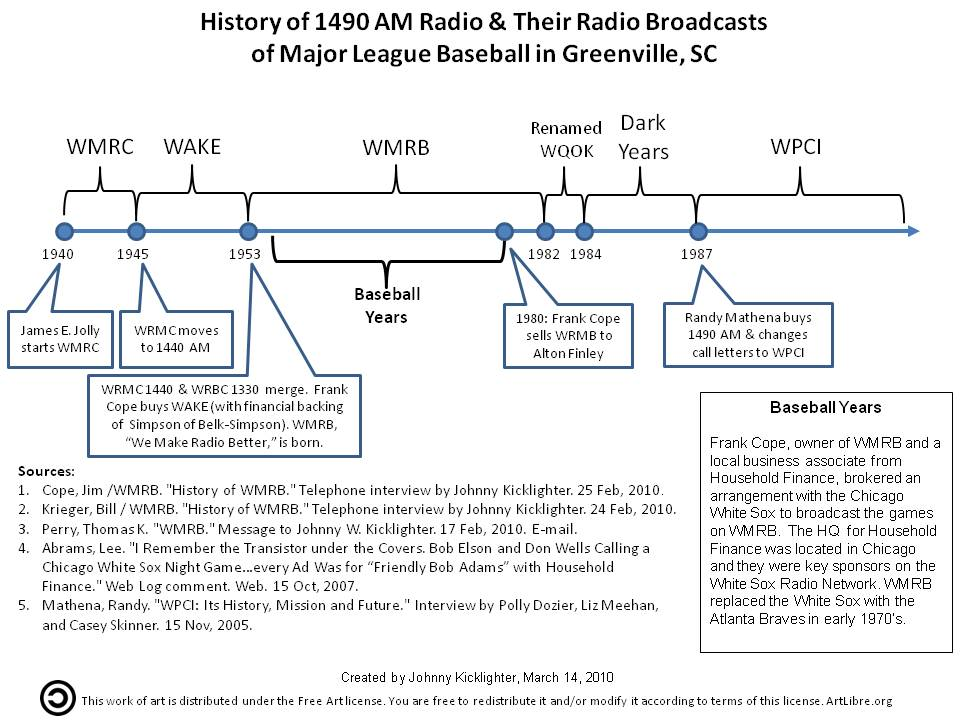
History of 1490 AM.

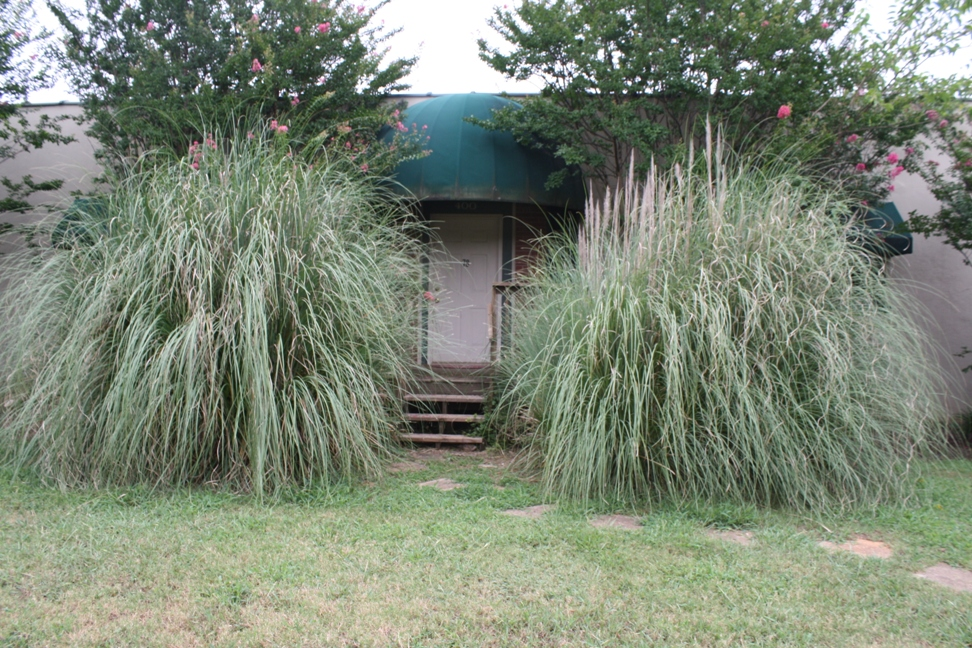
WPCI's studio is located at 78 Mayberry St. (2010 photo)
