= WFNQ (disambiguation) =

WFNQ is a radio station (106.3 FM) licensed to Nashua, New Hampshire.

WFNQ may also refer to:

- WTPT, a radio station (93.3 FM) licensed to Forest City, North Carolina, which held the call sign WFNQ from 1994 to 1996
- WZMX, a radio station (93.7 FM) licensed to Hartford, Connecticut, which held the call sign WFNQ from 1959 to 1962
