= WSSL =

WSSL may refer to:

- WSSL-FM, a radio station (100.5 FM) licensed to Gray Court, South Carolina, United States
- the ICAO code for Seletar Airport
