= WEVA =

WEVA may refer to:

- WEVA (AM), a radio station licensed to Emporia, Virginia, United States
- William Abraham (British Army officer) (1897–1980)
- World Electric Vehicle Association
