= WTPT =

- Forest City, North Carolina; United States
- Broadcast area: Upstate South Carolina; Western North Carolina
- Frequency: 93.3 MHz (HD Radio)
- Branding: 93.3 The Planet Rocks

Programming
- Language: English
- Format: Mainstream rock
- Subchannels: HD2: Southern gospel
- Affiliations: United Stations Radio Networks: Carolina Panthers Radio Network

Ownership
- Owner: Audacy, Inc.; (Audacy License, LLC)
- Sister stations: WFBC-FM; WORD; WROQ; WYRD; WYRD-FM

History
- First air date: September 10, 1947 (as WBBO-FM)
- Former call signs: WBBO-FM (1947–1994); WFNQ (1994–1996)
- Call sign meaning: "The Planet"

Technical information
- Licensing authority: FCC
- Facility ID: 4677
- Class: C
- ERP: 93,000 watts (analog); 3,720 watts (digital)
- HAAT: 619 meters (2,031 ft)
- Transmitter coordinates: 35°16′19.4″N 82°13′59.4″W
- Translator: See § Translator

Links
- Public license information: Public file; LMS
- Webcast: Listen Live
- Website: www.audacy.com/933theplanetrocks

WTPT (93.3 FM) is a mainstream rock station licensed to Forest City, North Carolina, and serving the Upstate South Carolina and Western North Carolina regions, including Greenville, South Carolina, and Asheville, North Carolina. The Audacy, Inc. outlet is licensed by the Federal Communications Commission (FCC) to broadcast with an ERP of 93 kW. The station goes by the name 93.3 The Planet Rocks and is the home station of the nationally syndicated The Rise Guys Morning Show with Matthew "Mattman" Harris, Jeremy "Fat Boy" Ellenburg, and Paige Pirtle-Loskoski.

The station broadcasts from near Columbus, North Carolina, with studios in Greenville, South Carolina. However, it is licensed to Forest City, North Carolina.

== History ==
The station, then known as WBBO-FM and WBBO (780 AM) ("We Build Business Opportunities"), signed on September 10, 1947, in Forest City, North Carolina. The station was owned by the Anderson family, which also owned the "Forest City Courier" newspaper and WPNF in nearby Brevard, North Carolina. Both stations simulcasted with each other on a full-time basis until the late 60s. WBBO-FM featured a variety of formats throughout the next decade, including country and adult contemporary. On January 1, 1988, after building a tower on Tryon Peak near Columbus, North Carolina, to improve its signal range, WBBO-FM switched to a satellite smooth jazz format, distributed from St. Paul, Minnesota, and began calling itself "The Breeze". artists included James Taylor, Sade, Sting, Stevie Wonder, Ramsey Lewis, as well as Windham Hill performers, and artists playing the music of Cole Porter. Listeners tended to be very educated and also enjoyed classical music and soft rock. WBBO-FM planned to move to Greenville, South Carolina in 1989. One listener described the music as "lasting quality ... not something that will be a big hit for six months and then fade away."

On February 14, 1991 (Valentines Day), WBBO-FM flipped to contemporary hit radio (CHR) as "Power 93". This move brought back the format to the nearby Greenville-Spartanburg market that the former WANS (now WJMZ) had before they abandoned it for adult contemporary. Initially, ratings were very good, but quickly fizzled out to 9th place, where it stayed throughout much of its existence. In August of next year, the Power 93 moniker was dropped for "93.3 WBBO" as the station became more Dance-oriented. Again, ratings had shown little improvement and was re-adjusted toward Mainstream CHR within a year.

In mid-1994, the station was re-branded as "Q-93" and adopted a more uptempo-ed CHR format sprinkled with plenty of alternative rock. Ratings started to slowly tick upward, but the station was sold to Benchmark Communications (then-owners of WESC and WESC-FM) and the format was dropped altogether on January 1, 1995, for a younger-skewing country format as "93-Q Country" under the WFNQ call letters. The station began the format with 19,095 songs in a row commercial-free, the most ever on a commercial radio station up to that time. The idea was to use WFNQ as a flanker against then-rival country outlet WSSL-FM so that WESC-FM could be the #1 station in the market. This strategy failed miserablely as WFNQ went to the bottom of the ratings within several months.

Programming also included the Christian music program Face to Face from Right Turn Radio.

On September 13, 1996, WFNQ dropped Young Country for active rock as "93.3 The Planet". The call letters of WTPT were adopted by the end of the year. After being acquired by Clear Channel Communications in the late 1990s, Barnstable Broadcasting purchased the station in 1999, along with WROQ. The company sold WTPT as well as WROQ and WGVC to Entercom Communications in 2005.

On December 19, 2025, WROQ changed format, and midday host and program director Jay "Stoneman" Stone took the afternoon slot on The Planet. WTPT increased the amount of classic rock it played, and pivoted to a mainstream rock format.

== HD Radio ==
WTPT-HD2 carries a simulcast of WHQA's southern gospel format, known as The Life FM, and is simulcast on the following translator:

| Call sign | Frequency | City of license | FID | ERP (W) | HAAT | Class | Transmitter coordinates | FCC info |
|---|---|---|---|---|---|---|---|---|
| W290BW | 105.9 FM | Greenville, South Carolina | 156090 | 99 | 299 m (981 ft) | D | 34°56′5″N 82°24′15″W | LMS |

WTPT-HD3 carried Audacy's BetQL Network on its HD2 channel, which was added on February 23, 2022. The HD3 channel was removed in July 2026, as BetQL had been merged in to Westwood One Sports, which is already carried on WFBC-HD3.
