= WGVC =

WGVC may refer to:

- WGVC-LP, a low-power radio station (104.1 FM) licensed to serve Gainesville, Florida, United States
- WYRD-FM, a radio station (106.3 FM) licensed to serve Simpsonville, South Carolina, United States, which held the call sign WGVC from 1999 to 2008
