= WLFJ =

WLFJ may refer to:

- WLFJ-FM, a radio station (89.3 FM) licensed to Greenville, South Carolina, United States
- WESC (AM), a radio station (660 AM) licensed to Greenville, South Carolina, which held the call sign WLFJ from 2000 to 2019
