= 860 AM =

AM radio frequency

The following radio stations broadcast on AM frequency 860 kHz: CJBC Toronto is the Class A station on 860 AM, a Canadian clear channel frequency.

== In Argentina ==
- Digital in Lanus, Buenos Aires
- LRA56 in Perito Moreno

== In Canada ==
Stations in bold are clear-channel stations.

Call sign	City of license	Daytime power kW	Nighttime power kW	Transmitter coordinates
CBKF-2	Saskatoon, Saskatchewan	10	10	52.25°N 106.66°W
CBKJ	Gold River, British Columbia	0.04	0.04	49.7733°N 126.054°W
CBKM	Blue River, British Columbia	0.04	0.04	52.1056°N 119.308°W
CBKZ	Clearwater, British Columbia	0.04	0.04	51.6439°N 120.037°W
CBTG	Gold Bridge, British Columbia	0.04	0.04	50.8392°N 122.863°W
CBUG	Kaslo, British Columbia	0.04	0.04	49.9081°N 116.9°W
CBUP	Merritt, British Columbia	0.04	0.04	50.1086°N 120.789°W
CFPR	Prince Rupert, British Columbia	10	2.5	54.285278°N 130.376111°W
CHAK	Inuvik, Northwest Territories	1	1	68.3447°N 133.686°W
**CJBC**	Toronto, Ontario	50	50	43.575°N 79.8175°W
CKSB-2	St. Lazare, Manitoba	0.04	0.04	50.4467°N 101.293°W

== In Mexico ==
- XECTL-AM in Chetumal, Quintana Roo
- XEMO-AM in Tijuana, Baja California
- XENL-AM in Monterrey, Nuevo Léon
- XEUN-AM in Tlalpan, Mexico City
- XEZOL-AM in Ciudad Juárez, Chihuahua

== In the United States ==
Call sign	City of license	Facility ID	Class	Daytime power kW	Nighttime power kW	Critical hours power	Transmitter coordinates
KFST	Fort Stockton, Texas	22102	B	0.25	0.25		30.876944°N 102.891667°W
KKAT	Salt Lake City, Utah	11232	D	10	0.196	3	40.713056°N 111.931389°W
KKOW	Pittsburg, Kansas	1881	B	10	5		37.412778°N 94.637778°W
KNAI	Phoenix, Arizona	1326	B	0.94	1		33.420556°N 112.126944°W
KNUJ	New Ulm, Minnesota	30122	D	1	0.005		44.286111°N 94.430556°W
KONO	San Antonio, Texas	50029	B	5	0.9		29.443056°N 98.417778°W
KOSE	Wilson, Arkansas	52902	D	1	0.021		35.684167°N 89.9825°W
KPAN	Hereford, Texas	35451	B	0.25	0.231		34.7925°N 102.429167°W
KSFA	Nacogdoches, Texas	11741	D	1	0.175		31.526667°N 94.658056°W
KTRB	San Francisco, California	66246	B	50	50		37.6325°N 122.129722°W (daytime); 37.592778°N 121.774167°W (nighttime)
KWPC	Muscatine, Iowa	47085	D	0.25	0.008		41.442778°N 91.075833°W
WACB	Taylorsville, North Carolina	2485	D	0.25	0.008		35.9325°N 81.171944°W
WAOB	Millvale, Pennsylvania	60155	B	1	0.83		40.490833°N 79.981944°W
WDMG	Douglas, Georgia	71342	B	5	5		31.506389°N 82.819444°W
WEVA	Emporia, Virginia	63479	D	1			36.698889°N 77.548611°W
WFMO	Fairmont, North Carolina	53609	D	1	0.012		34.5175°N 79.105278°W
WFSI	Baltimore, Maryland	43864	D	2.5	0.0657		39.311944°N 76.490556°W
WGUL	Dunedin, Florida	1177	B	5	1.5		27.998611°N 82.700278°W
WLBG	Laurens, South Carolina	61224	D	1	0.012		34.503611°N 82.018333°W
WMRI	Marion, Indiana	6337	B	1	0.5		40.553333°N 85.645833°W
WNOV	Milwaukee, Wisconsin	36069	D	0.25	0.005		43.072222°N 87.951944°W
WOAY	Oak Hill, West Virginia	12550	D	10	0.011	5	37.958333°N 81.150833°W
WSBS	Great Barrington, Massachusetts	4820	D	2.7	0.004	0.25	42.214722°N 73.345278°W
WSON	Henderson, Kentucky	26946	B	0.5	0.5		37.853056°N 87.536667°W
WTZX	Sparta, Tennessee	3341	D	0.95	0.01		35.922222°N 85.447222°W
WWDB	Philadelphia, Pennsylvania	74085	D	10			40.154444°N 75.369167°W
