= Marc Ryan (radio personality) =

American radio personality

- Born: May 24, 1977 (age 49); Syracuse, New York, U.S.
- Education: University of Florida
- Spouse: Angela Ryan (m. 2022)
- Children: 1
- Presenting career
- Show: Marc Ryan
- Stations: WXYT-FM, Detroit, Michigan
- Style: Sports radio
- Country: United States
- Previous shows: The Sports Section; The Morning Wrap; The Opening Drive; Booger and Ryan; Offsides with Marc Ryan

Marc Ryan (born May 24, 1977) is an American radio commentator. He is a fill-in host at WXYT-FM in Detroit, Michigan.

== Early life ==
Ryan was born in Syracuse, New York, though his family would move to Houston, Texas, Fort Collins, Colorado, and Lakeland, Florida. He would then move to Gainesville, Florida, graduating from the University of Florida with a telecommunications degree since they did not have a sports radio program.

== Career ==
Upon receiving advice from Orlando Magic announcer Paul Porter, Ryan would start his sports radio career by purchasing a time slot at WHOO, the ESPN Radio affiliate in Orlando, where he began The Sports Section around September 2005. He briefly served as a fill-in host for Sporting News Radio and was named "Best Radio Sports Host" by Orlando Magazine in 2009.

Ryan would move to Pensacola and host The Morning Wrap for The Ticket Sports Network at WTKE-FM in 2011, then moved to Atlanta where he purchased a time slot and hosted The Opening Drive at WWWE until he was hired as a fill-in host at the newly-launched WZGC-FM in October 2012. He then moved to Tampa and became the co-host of Booger and Ryan with former NFL player Booger McFarland at WHFS-FM, until the air staff was released following an ownership change and format flip in December 2014. He would then work for WDAE.

In 2016, Ryan moved back to Houston where he worked as a high school teacher and part-time host at KILT. In 2019, Ryan moved to Greenville where he hosted the afternoon show Offsides with Marc Ryan at WYRD.

Starting on April 1, 2024, Ryan was hired as a pre-game, post-game, and fill-in host for WXYT-FM in Detroit. He also had a nationally syndicated weekend show on Infinity Sports Network until the late 2025 rebrand.

== Personal life ==
Ryan met his wife Angela, a medical scientist, in Greenville. They married in 2022 and have a stepson named Jaxon.
