= ABC 30 =

ABC 30 may refer to:

== Current affiliates ==
- KFSN-TV in Fresno, California (O&O)
- KGBD-LD in Great Bend, Kansas:
  - Re-broadcasts KAKE in Wichita, Kansas

== Former affiliate ==
- KDNL-TV in St. Louis, Missouri (1995–2026)
