= WROQ =

- Anderson, South Carolina; United States
- Broadcast area: Upstate South Carolina
- Frequency: 101.1 MHz (HD Radio)
- Branding: 101.1 Big Buck Country

Programming
- Language: English
- Format: Country
- Subchannels: HD2: WOLI simulcast

Ownership
- Owner: Audacy, Inc.; (Audacy License, LLC)
- Sister stations: WFBC-FM; WORD; WTPT; WYRD; WYRD-FM

History
- First air date: 1947
- Former call signs: WCAC-FM (1947–1978); WAIM-FM (1978–1982); WCKN (1982–1991)
- Call sign meaning: "Rock" (The station's former moniker)

Technical information
- Licensing authority: FCC
- Facility ID: 318
- Class: C1
- ERP: 100,000 watts
- HAAT: 296 meters (971 ft)
- Transmitter coordinates: 34°38′51.4″N 82°16′12.4″W
- Translator: HD2: 102.9 W275BJ (Greenville)

Links
- Public license information: Public file; LMS
- Webcast: Listen live (via Audacy)
- Website: www.audacy.com/bigbuckcountry

WROQ (101.1 FM) "101.1 Big Buck Country" is a country music radio station licensed to Anderson, South Carolina, and serving the Upstate South Carolina region, including Greenville and Spartanburg. The Audacy, Inc. outlet is licensed by the Federal Communications Commission (FCC) to broadcast with an ERP of 100 kW. Its studios are in Greenville, and its tower is shared with WMYA-TV, located west of Fountain Inn, South Carolina.

== Station history ==
The station signed on as WCAC-FM in 1947 as the sister station to WAIM (1230 AM). It was owned by Wilton E. Hall, the publisher of the Anderson Independent and Daily Mail and one-time US Senator from South Carolina. The station is noted for being one of the earliest FM stations in the state. WCAC-FM had a "beautiful music" / standards format for many years.

In 1978, after the death of Wilton E. Hall, WCAC-FM, WAIM, and WAIM-TV (channel 40) were all sold to Franklin Outlaw (the founder of the BI-LO chain of grocery stores). Frank changed the format to freeform progressive rock. The moniker became "Rock 101 WCAC-FM" in early 1978. The logo was a large flaming fireball with the name Rock 101, WCAC-FM in large red letters. Rock 101 did many local live remotes. Many were held at ABC Jeans in the Belvedere Shopping Plaza in Anderson. It became WAIM-FM in September 1980, but kept the name as Rock 101. For many years the Rock 101 studios were located on the campus of Anderson College in Anderson, South Carolina. In 1986, the studios were moved about a mile down the road to a location that is going towards the Anderson Jockey Lot (a large flea market). The studios were moved from Anderson to Greenville in 1992. The Rock 101 name and format has been so long-lasting on the station that it has survived during four different sets of call letters beginning with the start of Rock 101 in 1978, those call letters being: WCAC-FM, WAIM-FM, WCKN and now WROQ since 1991. One of the early Rock 101 DJs in 1978 was Billy Love (the morning man on WRTH 103.3). Some of the Rock 101 DJs over the years have also included: Michael Scott "Super Shan" Shannon, Gary Jackson, Lee Rogers, Michael "The Doctor Mike" Allen, Kenny Thomas, Craig Allen, Mike Benson, Perry "Scooter" Leslie, Max Mace, Scott Summers, Billy "The Big Nightstalker" Walker, Diana Daniels, Robert "The Mad Dog" Mackney, Marc Bailey, James "Jim Spanky" Miller, K.C. and T.J. Carson, Tony Magoo, Brian Blades, The Intern, Robert Wagner, J.J. Michaels, Steve Chris, Jim Wilson, Danny Stevens, Nathan Norris, Lisa Rollins, Daniel "Danger Dan" Elm, J.D. "The Stoneman" Stone. Larry Wilson, Anne Robards, Ditti, Mark Hendrix, with Chris Lee, and Bill Cain among so many other Rock 101 DJs.

In the fall of 1982, WAIM-FM changed formats into a hybrid of CHR and AOR under the "Rock 40" format as WCKN, "The All New Rock 101 FM". From the word go the station set off to do battle with then dominant Top 40 outlet WANS-FM (now WJMZ-FM). In 1984, the station licensed the "Hot Hits" format from consultant Mike Joseph and tightened up the music, playing only 20 current songs and no re-currents or oldies. This approach did not work and was later dropped. In 1986, the playlist was broadened and adopted the moniker as "Power 101 FM, WCKN".

Despite these attempts, ratings remained in second place to WANS-FM's dominance in the CHR market. In late November 1987, the station started running promos about "giving the audience what they wanted". Then on December 1, 1987, the Rock 40 format and the "Power" name was officially dropped for an album rock format (with a strong musical lean toward classic rock) and "Rock 101" was reborn. During this time, two very popular shows on Rock 101 were, "The Rock 101's Midnight Tracker" where a random full rock and roll album would be played at midnight all the way through the morning, with no commercial interruption. On Friday nights at midnight, the same concept but with six albums played all the way back to back. The DJ's would state all of the tracks on each album and then play the album all the way through. The Friday night show was called "The Rock 101's Friday Night Six Pack". Both of these shows were very popular with listeners and continued on Rock 101 until the mid-1990s. The WCKN call letters were finally dropped for WROQ in February 1991 as the station shifted toward active rock but keeping the Rock 101 moniker. This approach was successful as the station became a solid Top 5 performer in the ratings for much of the 1990s and early 2000s, eventually going to No. 1 on several occasions during that time.

The station was eventually acquired by Barnstable Broadcasting in 2002. Since Barnstable at the time had also owned WROQ's main competitor WTPT, it was decided to shift the station towards into a full-fledged classic rock station. This move was meant to allow both stations some breathing room and ratings have strengthened since that time.

Clear Channel Communications signed on WBZT-FM in April 2002 as "96.7 The Buzzard", playing a mix of rock music from the 1960s through the present day. The move was meant to play spoiler to WROQ however the idea did not succeed, and the rock format was dropped at WBZT in 2007.

former logo

Entercom Communications acquired WROQ, along with WTPT and WGVC-FM (now WYRD-FM), from Barnstable in 2005.

In February 2014, WROQ rebranded as "Classic Rock 101.1 WROQ".

With the last John Boy and Billy show airing December 19, 2025, Audacy announced that WROQ would end its rock format after 47 years at 3 p.m. that day; midday host and program director Jay "Stoneman" Stone would subsequently take over the same slot on WTPT, and would redirect listeners to the latter station in the interim. Following a live goodbye show hosted by Stoneman (which would end with "See You on the Other Side" by Ozzy Osbourne), "101.1 Big Buck Country" debuted, carrying a broad mix of new and classic country from the past 40 years with the intention of competing against rival country outlets WSSL-FM and WESC-FM. The "Big Buck" format debuted with "Back in the Saddle" by Luke Combs, a native of nearby Huntersville, North Carolina.

== HD Radio ==
WROQ-HD2 carries a simulcast of 910 WOLI and its associated FM translator at 105.7’s Spanish CHR format, known as Kaliente 102.9, and is simulcast on the following translator:

| Call sign | Frequency | City of license | FID | ERP (W) | HAAT | Class | Transmitter coordinates | FCC info |
|---|---|---|---|---|---|---|---|---|
| W275BJ | 102.9 FM | Greenville, South Carolina | 138758 | 250 | 109 m (358 ft) | D | 34°56′29″N 82°24′40″W | LMS |
