= Booger McFarland =

American football player and analyst (born 1977)

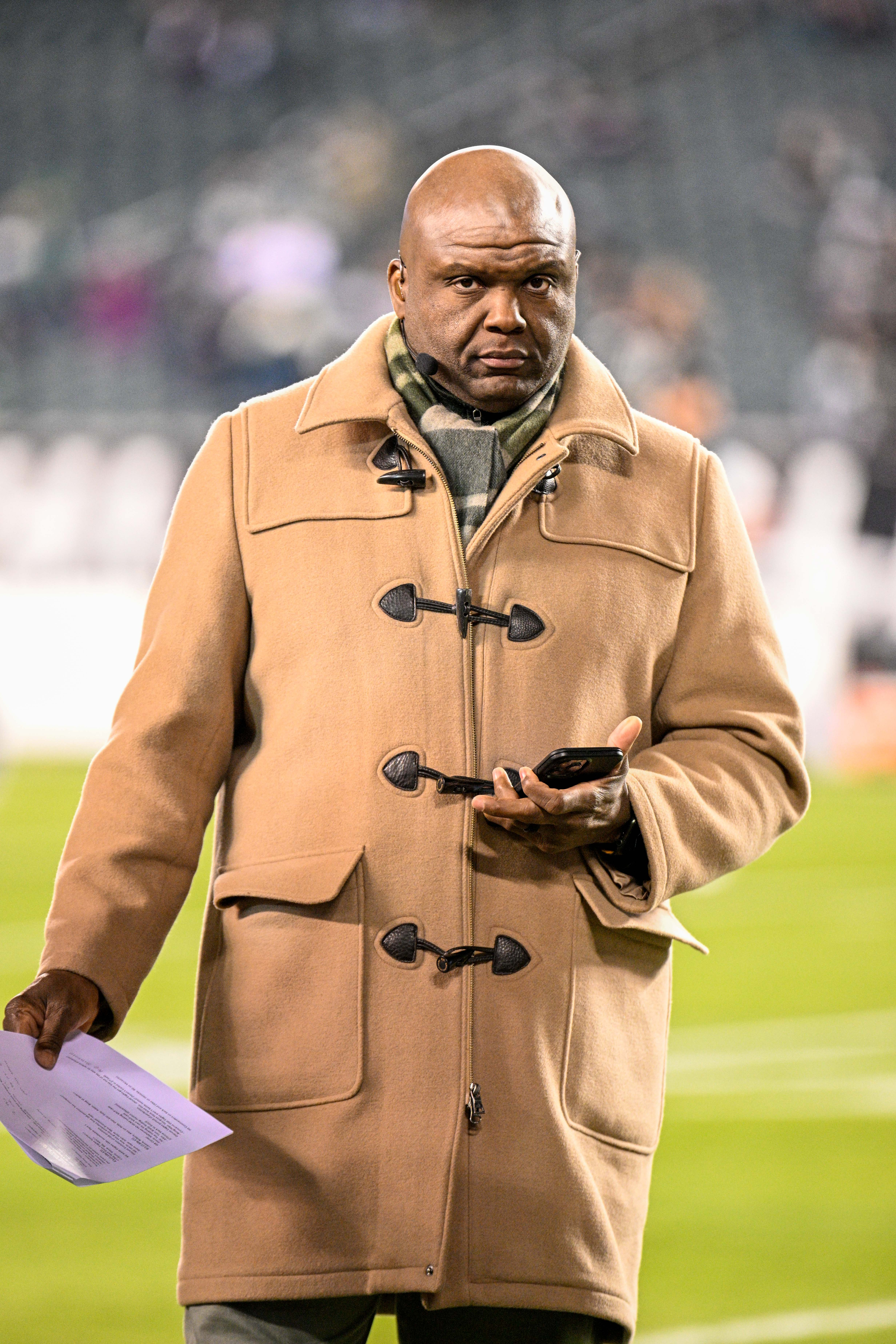
- McFarland in 2022

No. 92
- Position: Defensive tackle

Personal information
- Born: December 18, 1977 (age 48); Winnsboro, Louisiana, U.S.
- Listed height: 6 ft 0 in (1.83 m)
- Listed weight: 300 lb (136 kg)

Career information
- High school: Winnsboro
- College: LSU
- NFL draft: 1999: 1st round, 15th overall pick

Career history
- Tampa Bay Buccaneers (1999–2006); Indianapolis Colts (2006–2007)

Awards and highlights
- 2× Super Bowl champion (XXXVII, XLI); First-team All-American (1998); First-team All-SEC (1998); Second-team All-SEC (1996); SEC Freshman of the Year (1995)

Career NFL statistics
- Total tackles: 257
- Sacks: 22.5
- Forced fumbles: 4
- Fumble recoveries: 6
- Interceptions: 1
- Defensive touchdowns: 1
- Stats at Pro Football Reference

Anthony Darelle "Booger" McFarland (born December 18, 1977) is an American former professional football player who was a defensive tackle in the National Football League (NFL). He played college football for the LSU Tigers and was selected by the Tampa Bay Buccaneers in the first round of the 1999 NFL draft. McFarland also played for the Indianapolis Colts, and won two Super Bowl rings in his career: one with the Buccaneers (Super Bowl XXXVII) and another with the Colts (Super Bowl XLI). He was an analyst for Monday Night Football in 2018 and 2019, before joining as a pregame analyst on Monday Night Countdown in 2020.

== Early life ==
McFarland and his two siblings grew up in Winnsboro, Louisiana. He attended Winnsboro High School, where he was an All-State lineman for the Wildcats.

McFarland received the nickname "Booger" as a child, saying "I was a bad kid, getting into a lot of wild stuff. I used to get called a lot of different things. But that was just the one that stuck."

== College career ==
McFarland played for the LSU Tigers football team from 1995 to 1998. In his freshman year, he started every game at defensive tackle, finishing the season with 73 tackles (including 12 tackles for loss and 2 quarterback sacks) and quickly became a crowd favorite for pulling double-duty at the fullback position for short-yardage plays. He also recorded a tackle in LSU's victory over Michigan State at the 1995 Independence Bowl. For the rest of his collegiate career from his sophomore year onward, he focused on defensive tackle, and helped bring the Tigers to two further bowl wins in the 1996 Peach Bowl and the 1997 Independence Bowl, also earning 1996 Peach Bowl SEC Defensive MVP honors. Despite a spectacular collapse by the Tigers in the 1998 season, McFarland was named defensive co-captain his senior year, earned first-team All-SEC and All-America honors, and played in the 1999 Senior Bowl. He graduated in 1999 with a degree in business management.

== Professional career ==
Pre-draft measurables
Height	Weight	Arm length	Hand span	40-yard dash	10-yard split	20-yard split	20-yard shuttle	Three-cone drill	Vertical jump	Broad jump	Bench press
6 ft 0 1/2 in (1.84 m)	299 lb (136 kg)	33 3/8 in (0.85 m)	10 in (0.25 m)	4.85 s	1.79 s	2.88 s	4.28 s	7.98 s	28.5 in (0.72 m)	9 ft 0 in (2.74 m)	25 reps
All values from NFL Combine

McFarland was selected by the Tampa Bay Buccaneers in the first round with the 15th overall pick in the 1999 NFL draft. In eight seasons with the team, he totaled 305 tackles and 20 sacks over 84 games, and won Super Bowl XXXVII in 2002.

On October 17, 2006, McFarland was traded to the Indianapolis Colts for a second-round pick in the 2007 NFL draft. The trade reunited him with Tony Dungy, his head coach in Tampa Bay during his first three seasons. At the time of the trade, the Colts ranked last in the league in run defense, allowing over 116 yards per-game, and had lost defensive tackle Corey Simon to a season-ending injury the week before. McFarland made his first sack as a member of the Colts against the Buffalo Bills on November 10. He finished the regular season with 33 tackles and 2.5 sacks, although the Colts finished last in rush defense. In the playoffs, the Colts defense became stifling, limiting the Kansas City Chiefs to 44 rushing yards, the Baltimore Ravens to 83 and the New England Patriots to 93. McFarland started in Super Bowl XLI and recorded a sack, as the Colts defeated the Chicago Bears, 29–17, capturing his second Super Bowl ring.

He suffered a career-ending knee injury the following training camp.

== Broadcasting career ==
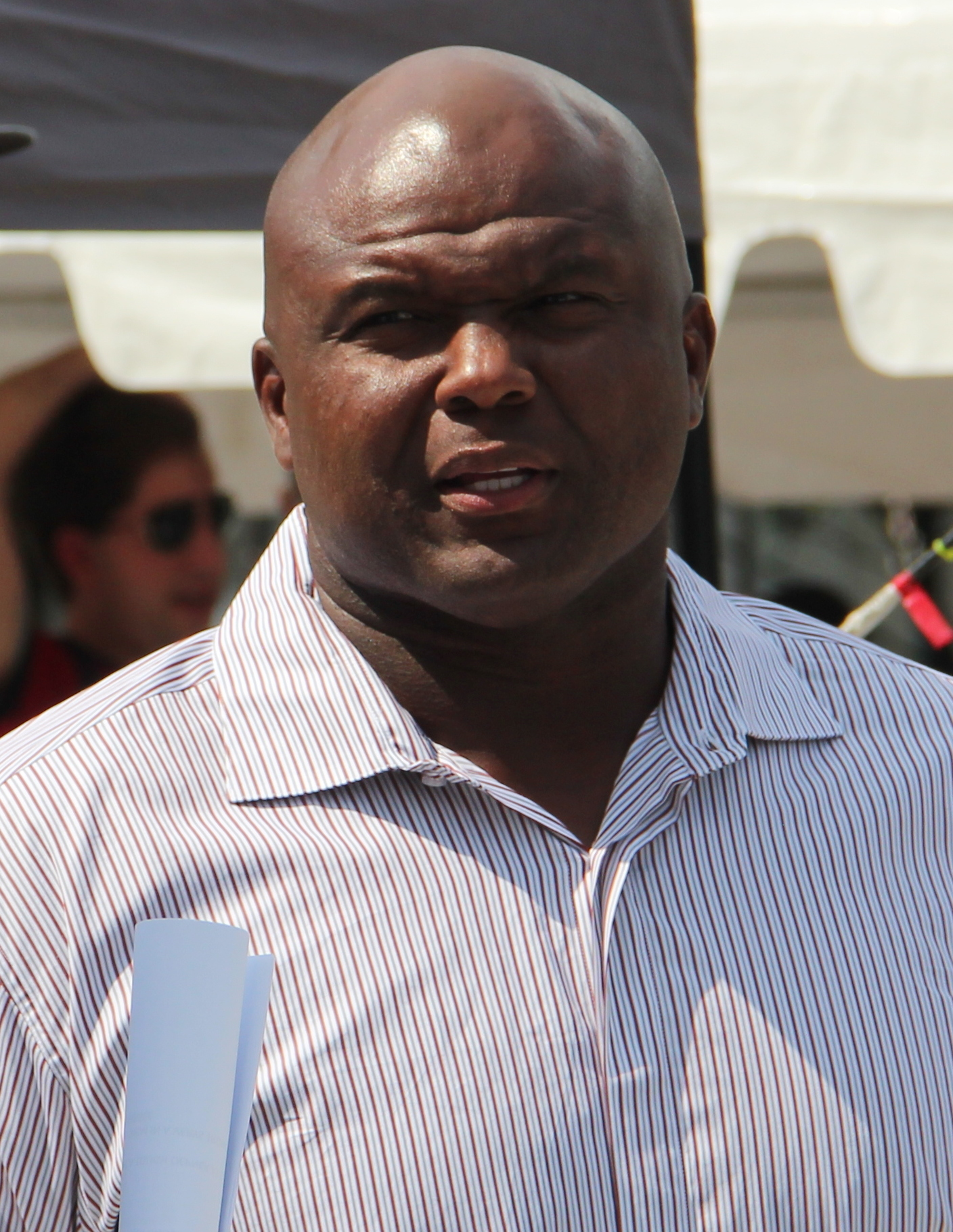
McFarland in 2018

McFarland co-hosted a radio show with Marc Ryan on Tampa sports radio station WHFS until an ownership change in December 2014 resulted in the station's entire airstaff being released for a music format. He joined the SEC Network in 2014 as a football analyst. McFarland was also a part-time guest analyst on ESPN's Mike & Mike morning program. McFarland was a color analyst for ESPN's Monday Night Football telecasts, after arriving with Jason Witten in 2018. Prior to his promotion to color analyst, McFarland was a sideline reporter and consultant during the Monday Night Football broadcasts where he announced from atop a crane-like contraption nicknamed the "Booger Mobile." After receiving criticism for blocking the view of fans seated near the field, the contraption was modified to be less obstructive. McFarland was promoted to color analyst in May 2019 after Witten left to return to the Dallas Cowboys. In May 2020, he and play-by-play announcer Joe Tessitore were reassigned by ESPN amid criticism from viewers. In dubbing MNF as "the worst (show) on television," UK newspaper The Guardian called McFarland "awful as a national NFL voice. He sounds like he's started a sentence and has no idea where it's going to end."

For the 2020 season, McFarland replaced Tom Jackson on NFL Primetime.

== Personal life ==
McFarland is married to Tammie McFarland. They have two children. McFarland is a Christian.
