= WSSL-FM =

- Gray Court, South Carolina; United States
- Broadcast area: Greenville - Spartanburg; Upstate South Carolina
- Frequency: 100.5 MHz
- Branding: Whistle 100.5

Programming
- Format: Country
- Affiliations: Premiere Networks

Ownership
- Owner: iHeartMedia, Inc.; (iHM Licenses, LLC)
- Sister stations: WESC, WESC-FM, WGVL, WMYI, WROO

History
- First air date: November 1960
- Former call signs: WLBG-FM (1960–1977); WGXL (1977–1981)
- Call sign meaning: Sounds like "whistle"

Technical information
- Licensing authority: FCC
- Facility ID: 59819
- Class: C0
- ERP: 100,000 watts
- HAAT: 381 meters (1,250 ft)
- Transmitter coordinates: 34°34′18.00″N 82°06′44.00″W

Links
- Public license information: Public file; LMS
- Webcast: Listen live (via iHeartRadio)
- Website: wsslfm.iheart.com

WSSL-FM (100.5 FM, "Whistle 100.5") is a commercial radio station licensed to Gray Court, South Carolina, United States, serving Greenville, Spartanburg and Upstate South Carolina. Owned by iHeartMedia, it airs a country music format, with studios on North Main Street in downtown Greenville.

WSSL-FM's transmitter is sited off Bethel Grove Church Road near Sawmill Road in Gray Court. WSSL-FM broadcasts in HD Radio.

== History ==
The first station at 100.5 MHz in the Greenville-Spartanburg market was WDXY-FM, a sister station to WORD 910 AM in Spartanburg. It was owned by the Spartanburg Radiocasting Company and launched in 1948. But with few people owning FM receivers in that era, the owners saw little opportunity to make the station profitable. The company turned in the license after a few years.

A new station signed on the air in November 1960 as WLBG-FM, the FM sister to WLBG 860 AM in Laurens. It became WGXL in the 1970s. The tower was moved to Gray Court and the power was increased to allow it to be heard in the Greenville-Spartanburg radio market. Well known local disc jockey Monty Dupuy moved his morning show from WFBC 1330 AM to what was then called "XL Stereo 100." Former WFBC-TV news director Dave Partridge also provided news on the station during this time.

WGXL was sold in the early 1980s to the Keymarket Group, which flipped the station to country music in September 1981. The call letters became WSSL-FM.

In August 2000, the station was acquired by Capstar. Capstar was later merged into Clear Channel Communications, the forerunner to today's iHeartMedia. This meant WSSL would be co-owned with competing country station WESC-FM 92.5 MHz. Musically, the stations were similar and both scored well in the ratings. Over time, WSSL became the more contemporary country station with WESC-FM leaning toward classic country. WSSL is home to the popular Ellis & Bradley morning show.
