= Weird =

Weird may refer to:

== Places ==
- Weird Lake, a lake in Minnesota, U.S.

== People ==
- "Weird Al" Yankovic (born 1959), American musician and parodist

== Art, entertainment, and media ==
=== Literature ===
- Weird US, a series of travel guides
- The Weird, a 2012 anthology of weird fiction
- Weird fiction, speculative literature written in the late 19th and early 20th century

=== Music ===
- "Weird" (Hanson song), 1998
- "Weird", a song from Hilary Duff's album Hilary Duff
- Weird!, a 2020 album by Yungblud
- New Weird America, a subgenre of psychedelic folk music of the mid-late 2000s
- "Weird", a song from Lizzy McAlpine's album Five Seconds Flat (2022)

=== Other art, entertainment, and media ===
- Weird (character), a fictional DC Comics character
- Weird: The Al Yankovic Story, a biographical comedy

== Other uses ==
- WEIRD, an acronym for "Western, educated, industrialized, rich and democratic", cultural identifier of psychology test subjects
- Weird number, a natural number that is abundant but not semiperfect
- Weird route, another name for Deltarune's alternate route

== See also ==
- Weirdo (disambiguation)
