= WMYI =

- Hendersonville, North Carolina; United States
- Broadcast area: Asheville, North Carolina; Greenville; Spartanburg, South Carolina
- Frequency: 102.5 MHz (HD Radio)
- Branding: 102.5 The Lake

Programming
- Format: Adult hits

Ownership
- Owner: iHeartMedia, Inc.; (iHM Licenses, LLC)
- Sister stations: WESC; WESC-FM; WGVL; WROO; WSSL-FM

History
- First air date: April 15, 1958
- Former call signs: WKIT-FM (1958–1987)
- Call sign meaning: "My" (former branding)

Technical information
- Licensing authority: FCC
- Facility ID: 59818
- Class: C1
- ERP: 43,000 watts (analog); 1,750 watts (digital)
- HAAT: 416 meters (1,365 ft)
- Transmitter coordinates: 35°13′20.00″N 82°32′58.00″W

Links
- Public license information: Public file; LMS
- Webcast: Listen live (via iHeartRadio)
- Website: 1025thelake.iheart.com

WMYI (102.5 FM) is a commercial radio station licensed to Hendersonville, North Carolina, and serving Western North Carolina and Upstate South Carolina. WMYI airs an adult hits format branded "102.5 The Lake" and is owned by iHeartMedia, Inc. Its studios and offices are located in downtown Greenville.

The station's broadcast tower, shared with WESC-FM, is located off YMCA Road, near the South Carolina/North Carolina border east of Cedar Mountain; its auxiliary transmitter is sited on the WUNF-TV tower on Pinnacle Mountain. WMYI broadcasts in HD Radio and is also available online via iHeartRadio.

== History ==
=== WHKP-FM and WKIT-FM ===
On April 15, 1958, the station signed on the air as WHKP-FM, co-owned with WHKP 1450 AM, with studios on Chimney Rock Highway in Hendersonville. It originally was powered at only 9,500 watts, a fraction of its current output. The two stations simulcast a country music format.

It later took the call sign WKIT-FM calling itself "Kit Country." Once a newer transmitter site with a taller tower was completed in 1987, the station stunted an all-Beatles format.

=== MY 102.5 WMYI ===
After the Beatles stunt concluded, the station changed its call letters to WMYI, playing adult contemporary music and calling itself "MY 102.5." The new format kicked off with a 102-day music marathon playing over 41,000 songs in a row.

WMYI enjoyed success with the popular "Love and Hudson Morning Show." During the mid to late 1990s, the station, while still successful, had slipped in the Arbitron ratings, but enjoyed a return to the top of the ratings by 2006. In Fall 2006, WMYI-FM was No. 1 both in age groups 12+ and 25-54 in the Greenville-Spartanburg market, surging past in-house country music sister stations WESC-FM and WSSL-FM, and even urban contemporary market leader WJMZ-FM. The station's ratings slipped after 2006, and have not returned to number one status since.

For several years until February 2009, the station aired all-1970s music on weekends until they were dropped in February 2009. However WMYI brought theme weekends back in August 2009 with "Flashback Weekends", playing 1970s and 1980s music. The station aired a Smooth Jazz brunch program on Sunday mornings. The station had "Commercial Free Music Hours" every weekday, running approximately every other hour, starting at 8:00 am.

My 102.5 logo, 2011-2019

=== Hot AC ===
On July 15, 2011, at midnight, the station updated its mainstream AC sound to a more hot adult contemporary format, dropping the 1970s music and many of the softer 1980s music that was once a staple of the station. It began using the updated positioner "The Fresh New Sound", focusing on upbeat 1990s to present-day music, with some 1980s music sprinkled in. The first song played on the Hot AC format was "Raise Your Glass" by P!nk. Artists heard on the station include Katy Perry, Lady Gaga and Daughtry. The station also debuted new jingles and liners, voiced by Sean Caldwell. Management dismissed some of the staff, including morning co-host Bill Love, who had been at the station for nearly 25 years. The station carried the syndicated "Delilah" program on weekday evenings for many years until January 2012. In parts of November and much of December, WMYI switched to all-Christmas music.

In April 2012, after almost a year of continuing to report as adult contemporary after the format adjustment, the station started reporting as Hot AC to Mediabase. Ratings slipped further under the Hot AC format. WMYI brought back Delilah, in an effort to boost ratings.

On October 31, 2019, the station switched early to all Christmas music, but this time under the temporary branding of "Christmas 102.5". The name change would foreshadow a more dramatic shift at the end of the year.

=== Adult Hits ===
WMYI debuted an adult hits format on December 31, 2019, at 4:00 pm, branded as 102.5 The Lake and primarily targeting the Upstate South Carolina Region. The first song played on "The Lake" was John Mellencamp's "Hurts So Good".

With the switch, WMYI has no local, in-person DJs. All announcements are made with pre-recorded voices. WMYI joined other iHeart adult hits stations identifying as "The Lake," including WLKO Charlotte and WHLK Cleveland. Unlike many other adult hits stations, WMYI has a classic rock lean, placing it in primary competition with Audacy's WROQ before that station changed format.
