= Weirdo =

Weirdo may refer to:

- An eccentric
- Weirdo (Emma-Jean Thackray album), 2025
- Weirdo (The Rasmus album), 2025
- Weirdo (comics), an alternative comics anthology published by Last Gasp
- Weirdo (graphic novel), 2024 graphic novel by Tony Weaver Jr. and Jes and CIn Wibowo
- "Weirdo" (song), a single by the Charlatans UK off their album Between 10th and 11th
- "Weirdo", a composition by Miles Davis, first released on Miles Davis, Vol. 3, 1954
- Weirdos (film), a 2016 Canadian drama film
- The Weirdos, a punk rock band
- The Weirdos, a puppet band featured on the Coldplay "Biutyful" video from the album Music of the Spheres
- "Weirdo", a song by K. Flay from Inside Voices / Outside Voices, 2022

== See also ==
- Weird-Ohs, an animated comedy series
- Weird (disambiguation)
