= New Rock =

Spanish shoe and clothing company

- Industry: Shoes and clothing
- Founded: 1978; 47 years ago in Yecla, Spain
- Founder: Ortuño family
- Headquarters: Spain
- Website: www.newrock.com

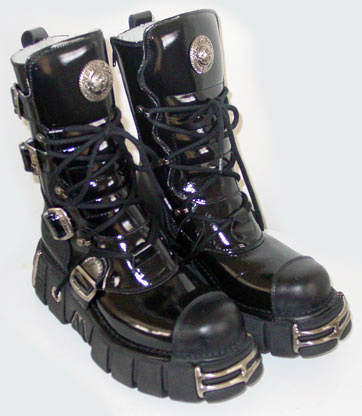
New Rock boots

New Rock is a Spanish shoe and clothing company that make goth style boots, shoes and clothes (though they do have some designs that may not be considered gothic).

The company was founded by the Ortuño family in 1978 in Yecla. The family has been making shoes and boots for three generations, spanning back to 1928.

Although footwear remains the main focus of the company, they also offer clothing, such as leather jackets and corsets. They also make motorcycle helmets.

== Styles ==
New Rock products include Gothic-style boots and shoes, motorcycle style boots, Western/cowboy boots, high-heeled boots, formal shoes and boots, and New Rock trainers.

Gothic musician Voltaire mentions New Rock products as a symbol of uniformity in "The Industrial Revolution (And How It Ruined My Life)."
