= WEVA (AM) =

- Emporia, Virginia; United States
- Broadcast area: Emporia, Virginia; Greensville County, Virginia
- Frequency: 860 kHz
- Branding: AM 860 WEVA

Programming
- Format: Full Service

Ownership
- Owner: Colonial Media Corporation

History
- First air date: November 4, 1952
- Former call signs: WEVA (1952–Present)
- Call sign meaning: W Emporia VirginiA

Technical information
- Licensing authority: FCC
- Facility ID: 63479
- Class: D
- Power: 1,000 Watts daytime only
- Transmitter coordinates: 36°41′56.0″N 77°32′55.0″W

Links
- Public license information: Public file; LMS
- Webcast: WEVA Webstream
- Website: WEVA Online

WEVA is a Full Service-formatted broadcast radio station licensed to Emporia, Virginia, serving Emporia and Greensville County, Virginia. WEVA is owned and operated by Colonial Media Corporation.
