= WCRS (AM) =

- Greenwood, South Carolina; United States
- Frequency: 1450 kHz

Programming
- Format: News/Talk

Ownership
- Owner: Anne Eller; (Anne's Entertainment Vision, Inc.)

History
- First air date: September 1, 1941
- Call sign meaning: Western Carolina's Radio Station

Technical information
- Licensing authority: FCC
- Facility ID: 25239
- Class: C
- Power: 1,000 watts unlimited
- Transmitter coordinates: 34°12′34″N 82°9′5″W
- Translator: 98.5 W253BL (Greenwood)

Links
- Public license information: Public file; LMS
- Webcast: Listen Live
- Website: wcrs1450am.net

WCRS (1450 AM) is a radio station licensed to Greenwood, South Carolina, United States. The station is licensed by the Federal Communications Commission (FCC) to broadcast on 1450 kHz with a transmitter power of 1 kW unlimited, non-directional.

== History ==
WCRS signed on on September 1, 1941, and became an affiliate of the Red Network.

In 1979, WCRS ended its simulcast with 96.7 FM.

Peregon bought WCRS and WHZQ from Pro-Com Communications LLC in 2006.

The station featured Citadel Media's Timeless Favorites satellite feed for many years.

WCRS now carries a variety of talk shows, such as The Rush Limbaugh Show and The Laura Ingraham Show.

In February 2010, it was purchased by Anne's Entertainment Vision, Inc.

== Translator ==
In May 2016, the station began broadcasting on FM via translator station W253BL.

Broadcast translator for WCRS
Call sign	Frequency	City of license	FID	ERP (W)	HAAT	Class	Transmitter coordinates	FCC info
W253BL	99.5 FM	Greenwood, South Carolina	156229	250	0 m (0 ft)	D	34°12′32.6″N 82°9′6.6″W	LMS
