= WTZX =

- Sparta, Tennessee; United States
- Broadcast area: Cookeville, Tennessee
- Frequency: 860 kHz
- Branding: Country Gold 860

Programming
- Format: Classic country

Ownership
- Owner: Peg Broadcasting, LLC
- Sister stations: WSMT

History
- Former call signs: WUCR (?-1983)

Technical information
- Licensing authority: FCC
- Facility ID: 3341
- Class: D
- Power: 1,000 watts (day); 10 watts (night)
- Transmitter coordinates: 35°55′20.00″N 85°26′50.00″W
- Translator: 92.7 W224DM (Sparta)

Links
- Public license information: Public file; LMS
- Website: pegbroadcasting.com

WTZX (860 AM, "Country Gold 860") is a radio station broadcasting a classic country music format. Licensed to Sparta, Tennessee, United States, the station serves the Cookeville area. The station is currently owned by Peg Broadcasting, LLC and features programming from Citadel Media and Dial Global.

On June 1, 2010, WTZX changed their format to classic country, branded as "Country Gold 860".

WTZX has been granted an FCC construction permit to move to a different transmitter site, decrease daytime power to 950 watts and add critical hours service with 950 watts.
