= Weird Lake =

Lake in the state of Minnesota, United States

- Location within Minnesota
- Location: Cook County, Minnesota
- Coordinates: 47°54′48″N 90°47′25″W
- Type: Lake
- Surface area: 47 acres (19 ha)

Weird Lake is a natural lake in Cook County, Minnesota, United States. The lake has a surface area of 47 acres (19 ha) and has a maximum depth of 6ft.

== See also ==
- List of lakes in Minnesota
