= WLBG =

Currently silent
- Laurens, South Carolina; United States
- Broadcast area: Laurens County, South Carolina
- Frequency: 860 kHz
- Branding: Real Radio 860 WLBG

Programming
- Format: Variety
- Affiliations: Fox Sports Radio; Fox News Radio

Ownership
- Owner: Emil Finley; (Southeastern Broadcast Associates, Inc.)

History
- First air date: March 28, 1948

Technical information
- Licensing authority: FCC
- Facility ID: 61224
- Class: D
- Power: 1,000 watts day; 12 watts night
- Transmitter coordinates: 34°30′13.4″N 82°1′5.3″W
- Translator: 104.1 W281BX (Laurens)

Links
- Public license information: Public file; LMS
- Webcast: Listen live
- Website: wlbg.com

WLBG (860 AM) is a silent radio station licensed to Laurens, South Carolina, serving Laurens County, South Carolina. The station is owned by Emil Finley's Southeastern Broadcast Associates, Inc., and is licensed by the Federal Communications Commission (FCC) to operate with 1 kW daytime and 12 watts at night. Its programming was also heard on FM translator W281BX (104.1). It went on the air in 1948, and suspended operations in 2025.

== History ==
WLBG, Inc., applied to build a new radio station on 820 kHz in Laurens in 1946; after amending the application to specify operation on 860 kHz, the construction permit was granted on March 20, 1947. WLBG went on the air at 6:15 AM on March 28, 1948; its first scheduled program was the Cavalry Baptist Church's sunrise Easter services.

Shortly after going on the air, James C. Todd, who was the station's general manager and already had a 5.9-percent stake in WLBG, bought full control for $8,000 from its other principals: L. C. Barksdale; Robert L. Easley; Kenneth Baker; W. C. Barksdale; E. D. Eeasterby; H. B. Gray; L. G. Galle; C. P. Roper; and R. H. Roper. Todd sold an interest in WLBG to his brother, John Wells Todd, in early 1949 for $14,500; they would each own 50 percent of the station after Kittie R. Todd relinquished her 1.67-percent stake later that year. John Wells Todd's stake was transferred to J. W. Todd III and Richard Todd following his death in 1950.

Scotland Broadcasting Company, owner of WEWO and WEWO-FM in Laurinburg, North Carolina, bought WLBG for $21,393 in 1955; principals included Edwin Pate; Wade S. Dunbar; J. R. Dalrymple; and six others. Later that year, the station was transferred to Laurens-Clinton Broadcasting Company; Scotland retained 73 percent of the new company, with 25 percent being held by C. W. Hogan, a salesman for WBTW in Florence.

Charles W. Dowdy, a former owner of stations in Georgia and Florida, bought WLBG for $63,000 from J. R. Dalrymple Jr. and C. W. Hogan in 1957. The following year, Hogan—who had remained the station's general manager—reacquired WLBG in a $65,000 deal. In November 1960, an FM sister station, WLBG-FM 100.5, was added; this station was sold to Towers South Inc. in 1977, eventually moving to the Greenville market as WSSL-FM. By then, C.M. McCuen had a 25-percent stake in the WLBG stations; a small interest was also held by C. W. Hogan's wife, Esther F.

Laurens-Clinton Broadcasting sold WLBG to Craig S. and Mary V. Turner's CraCom Inc. for $250,000 in 1981; Craig S. Turner was the chief engineer for WEAC and WAGI in Gaffney. The sale's completion that July ended C. W. Hogan's 26-year operation of the station. Two years later, CraCom sold WLBG to Emil J. and Mary Lou A. Finley's Southeastern Broadcast Associates for nearly $279,000; Emil Finley had been the general manager for WMYN in Mayodan, North Carolina. By this point, WLBG was losing money, having struggled since the sale of WLBG-FM; under the Finleys, the station's listenership and advertising base improved.

On March 21, 2025, WLBG announced that it would close on March 31; it had been for sale for 8 years, but found it could not compete with social media. The station's licenses will be retained while Emil Finley continues to seek a buyer.

== Programming ==
Prior to going silent, WLBG carried a variety of programming, notably Glenn Beck, Coast to Coast AM, and Fox Sports Radio. The station also produced its own news/talk programming, as well as a few urban contemporary shows.

== Translator ==
Call sign	Frequency	City of license	FID	ERP (W)	Class	Transmitter coordinates	FCC info
W281BX	104.1 FM	Laurens, South Carolina	200823	250	D	34°30′16.4″N 82°1′10.3″W	LMS
