= WYRD-FM =

Radio station in Spartanburg, South Carolina

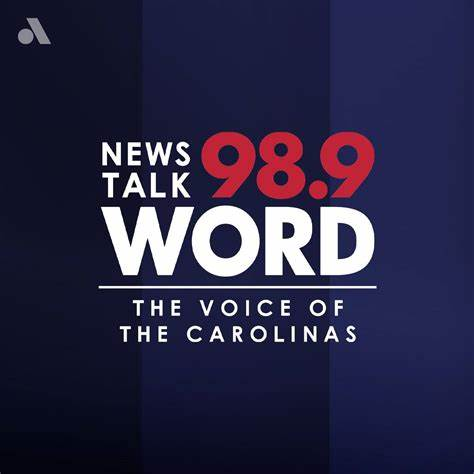
- Spartanburg, South Carolina; United States
- Broadcast area: Upstate South Carolina; Western North Carolina
- Frequency: 98.9 MHz (HD Radio)
- Branding: News Talk 98.9 WORD

Programming
- Format: News/talk
- Subchannels: HD2: Conservative talk (WYRD (AM))
- Network: Fox News Radio
- Affiliations: WSPA-TV; Compass Media Networks; Premiere Networks; Salem Radio Network; Westwood One

Ownership
- Owner: Audacy, Inc.; (Audacy License, LLC)
- Sister stations: WFBC-FM; WORD; WROQ; WTPT; WYRD

History
- First air date: August 29, 1946
- Former call signs: WSPA-FM (1946–2023)
- Call sign meaning: derived from sister station WYRD

Technical information
- Licensing authority: FCC
- Facility ID: 66400
- Class: C
- ERP: 100,000 watts (analog); 3,980 watts (digital)
- HAAT: 581.4 meters (1,907 ft)
- Transmitter coordinates: 35°10′11.4″N 82°17′27.4″W

Links
- Public license information: Public file; LMS
- Webcast: Listen live (via Audacy)
- Website: www.audacy.com/989word

WYRD-FM (98.9 MHz, "News Talk 98.9 WORD") is a news/talk station licensed to Spartanburg, South Carolina, and covering the Upstate region, including Greenville as well as part of North Carolina. It is owned by Audacy, Inc., with studios on Garlington Road in Greenville. WYRD-FM has an effective radiated power (ERP) of 100,000 watts, the maximum for most FM stations. The transmitter is on Hogback Mountain Road in Landrum.

WYRD-FM carries three local programs on weekdays: The Tara Show with Tara Servatius airs in morning drive time. Straight Talk with Bill Frady is heard in late mornings and The Charlie James Show airs in late afternoons. Syndicated talk programs include The Mike Gallagher Show, The Mark Levin Show, Ground Zero with Clyde Lewis, Coast to Coast AM with George Noory and America in the Morning. Most hours begin with an update from Fox News Radio.

== History ==
=== WSPA-FM ===
The station signed on the air on August 29, 1946. The call sign was WSPA-FM and the station largely simulcast its sister station, WSPA (950 AM). WSPA-FM was the first FM station in South Carolina. On August 1, 1961, it added the first stereo signal in the Southeastern United States.

WSPA-FM became the strongest FM station in the United States with a move to Hogback Mountain, 3,200 feet (980 m) in elevation. Coupled with a 100,000-watt signal, WSPA-FM was one of the first stations to use a new system of vertical and horizontal towers. The station could be heard from Asheville, North Carolina, to Augusta, Georgia, and from Gainesville, Georgia, to Charlotte.

=== Beautiful music ===
By the late 1960s, WSPA-FM had a separate format from 950 AM. WSPA-FM aired a beautiful music sound including some classical music, such as the Metropolitan Opera, "The Classical World of Stereo" and other shows on Sundays.

The station broadcast from 8 a.m. to midnight seven days a week, with light music during the day, dinner music in the evening, and "featured works" at night.

As of 1976 WSPA-FM used the syndicated "FM 100" beautiful music format, originating from WLOO in Chicago.

=== Move to soft AC ===
WSPA-FM ranked third in the Arbitron ratings and second with adults in Fall 1984, with midday numbers taking a significant jump. Though still considered beautiful music, WSPA-FM added more contemporary artists such as the Captain and Tennille, Dionne Warwick and John Denver while decreasing the instrumentals. The station was making an effort to stop being considered background music.

With the switch by WZXI in the Charlotte area from beautiful music, WSPA-FM showed up in the Spring 1986 Arbitron ratings for Charlotte, the only beautiful music station serving the area.

On February 19, 1991, WSPA-FM officially made the switch to soft adult contemporary or "Lite music". which according to the Spartanburg Herald-Journal was "the first format change since Harry Truman". WSPA-FM had always played easy listening music and was the area's only remaining station of that type. Though still seventh with listeners 25-54, WSPA-FM needed to reach younger listeners, and WSPA-FM was doing this with soft vocals and a few instrumentals as "Lite FM, 98.9", which was still the area's softest station. Many people liked the new sound, which included lots of 1970s music, but some complained to the newspaper and to the morning show of Mike Vassy, who had worked at the station since 1968. The change improved the station's ratings from eighth in Fall 1990 to fifth in Winter 1991, and from sixth to fourth with adults.

In fall 1994, Spartan Radiocasting, owner of WSPA and WSPA-FM, made a local marketing agreement with Augusta, Georgia-based Keymarket Communications. Early in 1995, WSPA-FM, described as "light-rock", moved its studios to Greenville, along with WFBC and WORD (910 AM), while WSPA AM would move in with WSPA-TV.

=== Changes in ownership ===
River City Broadcasting, which bought Keymarket, also purchased an option to buy the radio stations. Sinclair Broadcast Group, owner of WFBC-TV and WLOS-TV, bought River City and on July 1, 1998, bought "Light Rock 98.9", WFBC-FM, WYRD (the former WFBC), WORD, WOLI-FM and WOLT.

In December 1999, Entercom bought 41 radio stations from Sinclair. Entercom became Audacy in 2021.

Logo as Magic 98.9

By 2002, WSPA-FM was "Magic 98.9, The Upstate's Best Variety", with a mainstream adult contemporary format.

=== Switch to talk radio WYRD-FM ===
On March 6, 2023, Audacy announced that WSPA-FM and WYRD-FM 106.3 would swap formats and call signs beginning March 28. The move was intended to put WYRD-FM's talk radio programming on the larger 98.9 signal running 100,000 watts vs. the 25,000-watt signal on 106.3 FM.

The Magic format was heard on 106.3 FM until April 1, 2024, and continued to be available on HD Radio via 98.9's HD2 digital subchannel until September 29, 2025, when Audacy launched a new conservative talk station, "Upstate Red", on 98.9 HD2, WYRD AM, and WORD. Magic Upstate continues to be available on WFBC-FM's HD4 subchannel and their translators W236CD (95.1, Seneca) and W268DL (101.5, Anderson).
