= WWOL =

- Forest City, North Carolina; United States
- Frequency: 780 kHz
- Branding: The Gospel Voice of the Carolina Foothills

Programming
- Format: Southern Gospel

Ownership
- Owner: Holly Springs Baptist Broadcasting

History
- First air date: September 10, 1947
- Former call signs: WBBO
- Call sign meaning: Wonderful Words of Life

Technical information
- Licensing authority: FCC
- Class: D
- Power: 10,000 watts day only
- Transmitter coordinates: 35°21′02″N 81°54′04″W

Links
- Public license information: Public file; LMS
- Website: www.wwol780.com

WWOL (780 AM) is a radio station licensed to Forest City, North Carolina, United States, broadcasting a Southern Gospel format.

As of October 29, 1989, the station is owned by Holly Springs Baptist Broadcasting. WWOL began broadcasting on April 1, 1990, but the frequency was signed on as WBBO ("We Build Business Opportunities") on September 10, 1947, by Rutherford Radio Company. In 1947, the call letters WWOL were first used for a radio station in Lackawanna, New York, which is now WBBF, and on its FM counterpart, which is now WHTT-FM.
