= WFBC-FM =

Contemporary hit radio station in Greenville, South Carolina

- Greenville, South Carolina; United States
- Broadcast area: Upstate South Carolina
- Frequency: 93.7 MHz (HD Radio)
- Branding: B93.7

Programming
- Language: English
- Format: Contemporary hit radio
- Subchannels: HD2: Urban contemporary "The Block"; HD3: Sports radio "The Fan Upstate"; HD4: Adult contemporary "Magic"

Ownership
- Owner: Audacy, Inc.; (Audacy License, LLC)
- Sister stations: WORD; WROQ; WTPT; WYRD; WYRD-FM

History
- First air date: May 12, 1947
- Call sign meaning: "First Baptist Church"; "We Foster Better Citizenship" (taken from WFBC-TV)

Technical information
- Licensing authority: FCC
- Facility ID: 34390
- Class: C
- ERP: 100,000 watts
- HAAT: 552 meters (1,811 ft)
- Transmitter coordinates: 35°6′43.4″N 82°36′23.5″W
- Translators: HD2: 96.3 W242BX (Greenville); HD2: 104.5 W283CG (Inman); HD2: 107.7 W299BK (Anderson); HD3: 97.1 W246CV (Spartanburg); HD3: 97.7 W249DL (Greenville); HD3: 101.5 W268DL (Anderson)

Links
- Public license information: Public file; LMS
- Webcast: Listen live (via Audacy); Listen live (via Audacy) (HD2); Listen live (via Audacy) (HD3); Listen live (via Audacy) (HD4)
- Website: www.audacy.com/b937; www.audacy.com/963theblock (HD2); www.audacy.com/thefanupstate (HD3); www.audacy.com/magicupstate (HD4)

WFBC-FM (93.7 MHz) is a Top 40 (CHR) station licensed to Greenville, South Carolina, and serving the Upstate and Western North Carolina regions, including Greenville, Spartanburg, and Asheville, North Carolina. The Audacy, Inc. outlet is licensed by the Federal Communications Commission (FCC) to broadcast with an ERP of 100 kW. The station goes by the name B93.7.

The station's transmitter is located on Caesars Head Mountain in northern Greenville County. WFBC-FM has coverage in almost all of Upstate South Carolina (includes the Piedmont and Foothills), parts of Northeast Georgia, and parts of Western North Carolina. This station can be heard as far east as Charlotte, North Carolina, as far south as Irmo, South Carolina, as far north as Greeneville, Tennessee, and as far southwest as Athens, Georgia. Its studios are in Greenville.

== History ==
The call letters WFBC were taken from a station in Knoxville, Tennessee, that had gone off the air in the early 1930s and reassigned to Greenville. WFBC signed on the air May 3, 1933. Former WFBC program director Norvin Duncan said that the WFBC call letters stood for "First Baptist Church". Three other stations in the Greenville market used the WFBC call sign: The original AM station owned by the Peace family, owners of the Greenville News and Greenville Piedmont, and broadcasting on 1330 kHz, now WYRD; television channel 4, signed on by the family in 1953, which used the calls until 1983 (when it became WYFF); and TV channel 40 in Anderson, which changed its calls to WFBC-TV from WAXA after an ownership change. The WFBC-TV call sign was used on channel 40 until 1999; it is now WMYA-TV.

WFBC-FM signed on May 12, 1947, as a sister station to WFBC. The programming was 90% simulcast for the first 8 to 10 years featuring block local programming and NBC Radio Network programs. The early management team included: Bevo Whitmire, Ken Beechboard, R. A. Jolly, Wilson Wearn and Bruce Buchanan.

During the late 1940s and early 1950s, WFBC-FM featured the Esso Reporter each 30 minutes during the morning hours with Norvin Duncan as host. Other early morning shows; Housekeeping-a-hobby with Alice Wyman, Kitchen Kapers with Claude Freeman and The "Aristocratic Pigs" with Baby Ray.

WFBC-FM's later morning shows featured "Shelley's Shenanigans" with Bob Shelley (1953–1956), Bob Poole and "Pooles Party Line" (1957–1961). In 1962, Monty Dupuy became the long running host of the simulcast morning show which was one of the most popular shows in Greenville Radio History garnering more than 50% of the audience for more than 15 years. Dupuy was the morning host on WFBC-FM from 1962 to 1977. In 1965, WFBC-FM began independent programming of "light music" and "Music with McMasters" only simulcasting during the Dupuy morning show and special events. WFBC-FM started programming Drake Chenaults (Hit Parade) format in early 1971 becoming one of the most popular radio stations in the upstate.

The WFBC stations shared the same building from 1955 until 1977, when a new radio facility was built adjacent to WFBC-TV on Rutherford Street. The entire facility was dubbed "Broadcast Place".

Past on-air staff during the 1960s and 1970s on WFBC-FM include: Norvin Duncan, Johnny Wright, Bob Poole, Bob Shelley, Monty Dupuy, Stowe Hoyle, Ben Greer, Bill Kregar, Verner Tate, Alice Wyman, Claude Freeman, Wilfred Walker, Billy Powell, Lee Kanipe, Max Mace, Jeff Fields, Ray Clune, Johnny Batson, Andy Scott, Ken Rogers, Dan Kelly, Jerry Haynes, Jim Burnside, Eston Johnson, Scott Shannon, Bill Love, Dale Gilbert, Dave Partridge, Jim Phillips, Rick Driver and Patty Snow.

WFBC-FM was an adult contemporary station during the 1970s and 1980s, and an oldies station in the early 1990s, with the name "Oldies B 93.7" and then just "Oldies 93.7". Announcers in that time frame included; Ken Rogers, Steve Chris, Lee Alexander, Russ Cassell, Robin Keith ("Rockin Robin"), Chris Scott, Heidi Aiken, Eric Rogers, Lisa Rollins, Jan Meng, Little Anthony Keller, Dan Stevens, "Spanky" Jim Miller, Lee Nolan, "Brother Bill" Prather, Joe Fletcher, Lou Simon and many more. As an oldies outlet, WFBC featured the popular weeknight oldies request show "Into The Night" with Jan Ming. They also played Dick Clark, Mike Harvey and Dick Bartley national oldies shows on the weekends. The station also produced and networked several award-winning Carolina Beach Music shows with Ken Rogers and Leighton Grantham. The format was 1950s-early 1970s rock and roll oldies and was successful for many years. During this period, the station was known for doing live remotes and broadcast Memorial Day Weekends live from "Freedom Weekend Aloft". WYFF-TV weatherman Dale Gilbert did mid-mornings on WFBC-FM during part of this period as well as doing the morning weather broadcasts on channel 4.

In April 1994, WFBC and WFBC-FM were sold, and in 1995, after stunting with a disc jockey reading the local phone book, WFBC-FM switched to its current CHR format. This outraged many local oldies listeners, and soon, 103.3 and 103.9 (WOLT and WOLI-FM) picked up the oldies format.

In 1997, Tias Schuster was the station's mascot Buzzy Bee, later becoming afternoon DJ and music director. Schuster returned to the station as program director in 2012.

WFBC added On Air with Ryan Seacrest in November 2008. The station's main competition has been rhythmic CHR WHZT, owned by Summit Media, and hot AC WMYI, owned by Clear Channel Communications, which later changed to adult hits.

On September 13, 2024, WFBC-FM began teasing a change coming on September 23 at 7:00 a.m.. At that time, after a half-hour of three fake format changes (Christmas music as "Magic 93.7", classic hits as "Earth-FM", and classic hip-hop as "93.7 The Block"), the station announced the addition of the Jacksonville, Florida-based "Dex & Barbie T Show", hosted by Dex Mitchell and Barbie T. Whitmire, in afternoons. Mitchell and Whitmire had previously worked at WHZT prior to moving to WAPE-FM in Jacksonville in 2023.

== HD channels ==
=== HD2 (The Block) ===
W242BX, formerly a translator for WHRZ-LP, launched with country music as "Kicks 96.3" on October 14, 2015, but this was revealed to be a stunt. On October 16, the station switched to variety hits as "Simon", with an official announcement of the final format to follow. This announcement on October 21 at noon appeared to confirm Simon was the final format, but at 5 p.m., the station switched to mainstream urban, using the name "96.3 the Block" and playing 10,000 songs in a row (the first song was "Hotline Bling" by Drake). The station added The Steve Harvey Morning Show in mornings on November 2. On May 5, 2016, The Block began simulcasting on 104.5 W283CG Inman and rebranded as "96.3/104.5 The Block". 104.5 had completed its move from Tryon and operates from just outside Spartanburg. On March 21, 2019, a third signal was added, in Anderson, on 107.7 W299BK, giving the station almost full coverage of the entire market across the three signals. The stations are now known as "The Block", or "The Block (96.3 Greenville, 104.5 Spartanburg, 107.7 Anderson)".

Broadcast translators for WFBC-FM HD2
Call sign	Frequency	City of license	FID	ERP (W)	HAAT	Class	Transmitter coordinates	FCC info
W242BX	96.3 FM	Greenville, South Carolina	156099	250	332 m (1,089 ft)	D	34°56′27.4″N 82°24′40.4″W	LMS
W283CG	104.5 FM	Inman, South Carolina	156119	250	0 m (0 ft)	D	34°58′52″N 81°59′10″W	LMS
W299BK	107.7 FM	Anderson, South Carolina	150122	190	0 m (0 ft)	D	34°31′55.7″N 82°41′36.1″W	LMS

=== HD3 (The Fan Upstate) ===
WFBC-FM HD3 airs programming which carry the Infinity Sports Network and the BetQL Network. "The Fan Upstate" is heard on two FM translators across the market via WFBC-FM HD3: W246BU in Spartanburg, which moved from 97.1 FM in Spartanburg to 97.7 on August 19, 2016; as of February 8, 2017, the translator is licensed to serve Greenville, South Carolina, and the call sign was changed to W249DL. In Spartanburg, a translator, W246CV signed on the 97.1 frequency early in 2017, providing FM coverage across the Spartanburg portion of the market. In September 2025, W249DL in Anderson, SC began carrying The Fan programming, further extending the simulcast's reach. Another third translator, W290BW 105.9, once served the eastern part of the Greenville area.

Broadcast translators for WFBC-FM HD3
Call sign	Frequency	City of license	FID	ERP (W)	HAAT	Class	Transmitter coordinates	FCC info
W249DL	97.7 FM	Greenville, South Carolina	156091	250	0 m (0 ft)	D	34°56′5.4″N 82°24′15.4″W	LMS
W246CV	97.1 FM	Spartanburg, South Carolina	151679	250	0 m (0 ft)	D	35°58′52″N 81°59′10″W	LMS
W268DL	101.5 FM	Anderson, South Carolina	156087	250	0 m (0 ft)	D	34°28′14.4″N 82°38′2.5″W	LMS

=== HD4 (Magic) ===
WFBC-FM HD4 previously relayed the adult contemporary format of 106.3 WSPA-FM, and prior to that, the news/talk format of 106.3 WYRD-FM. WYRD's talk format moved to 98.9 on March 28, 2023, and was switched with the adult contemporary format. Since the 106.3 signal did not reach Asheville, this HD channel provided some over-the-air coverage to Asheville, along with Audacy's audio stream elsewhere within the US. When WSPA-FM was sold and flipped to Regional Mexican on April 1, 2024, the HD4 channel continued airing the adult contemporary format along with WYRD-HD2.

== Morning show ==
The "Hawk and Tom Morning Show" is hosted by Hawk Harrison, Tom Steele, Torry Seward, and Kato Keller. It features Torture Tuesday, The Second Date Update and Crank Calls with Thelma Holister, Cecil B. Holister and Mumbleman as primary characters. The Hawk and Tom Show has been broadcasting since April 13, 1997, and for two years before that as the Hawk and Marty Show.

Hawk and Tom hosted the Upstate Race for the Cure each year from 1997–2006 and helped to raise money for Susan G. Komen for the Cure.

In 2008 they began hosting the Children's Miracle Network's Radiothon to raise money for the Greenville Hospital System's Children's Hospital. For the 2008 Radiothon they set a new record raising $210,000 for the Greenville Hospital System's Children's Hospital. In 2009 they raised $260,000 for the Greenville Hospital System's Children's Hospital.
