= WORD (AM) =

Simulcasts WYRD Greenville
- Spartanburg, South Carolina; United States
- Broadcast area: Upstate South Carolina
- Frequency: 950 kHz
- Branding: Upstate Red

Programming
- Language: English
- Format: Conservative talk
- Affiliations: Fox News Radio; Premiere Networks; Townhall; Westwood One

Ownership
- Owner: Audacy, Inc.; (Audacy License, LLC)
- Sister stations: WFBC-FM; WROQ; WTPT; WYRD; WYRD-FM

History
- First air date: February 17, 1930
- Former call signs: WSPA (1930–2002)
- Call sign meaning: Word; no particular meaning otherwise

Technical information
- Licensing authority: FCC
- Facility ID: 66390
- Class: D
- Power: 5,000 watts day; 65 watts night
- Transmitter coordinates: 34°58′52.4″N 81°59′10.4″W

Links
- Public license information: Public file; LMS
- Webcast: Listen live (via Audacy)
- Website: www.audacy.com/upstatered

WORD (950 kHz), known on-air as "Upstate Red", is a conservative talk-formatted AM radio station in the Greenville-Spartanburg area of Upstate South Carolina. This Audacy, Inc. outlet is licensed by the Federal Communications Commission (FCC) to Spartanburg, South Carolina, and broadcasts with a power of 5,000 watts during the day and 65 watts at night using a nondirectional antenna. The "Upstate Red" format can also be heard on the second HD Radio channel of WYRD-FM. WORD's transmitter is located on the aptly named Broadcast Drive in Spartanburg, while its studios are in Greenville.

== History ==
WORD signed on September 1, 1940, at 910 AM as Spartanburg's second radio station, under the ownership of Spartanburg Advertising Company, which also owned WSPA, a station that was established a decade previous. WORD used studio and tower space from WSPA.

In 1944, the FCC ordered the WSPA-WORD combination to be broken up due to ownership regulations that prohibited an owner from having more than one AM station per market. This was completed on March 17, 1947, when WORD was sold to Spartan Radiocasting. Sister FM station WDXY (100.5 FM) signed on the air April 14, 1948, but would sign off the air by the end of the 1950s.

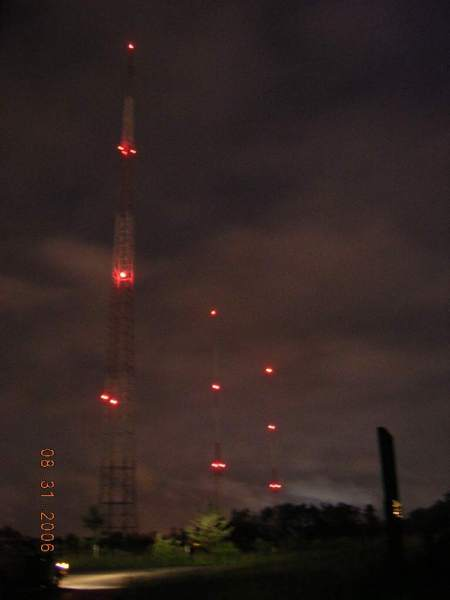
950 WORD's towers

In 1952, a dispute erupted between both Spartan Radiocasting and Liberty Life over a proposed allocation for television channel 7 in Spartanburg. It was settled in 1958 when Spartan Radiocasting bought back WSPA and WSPA-FM from Liberty Life Insurance and spinning off WORD and WDXY to different ownership.

WORD was well known as Spartanburg's Top 40 powerhouse in the 1960s and 1970s under the name "Big Word". Some of the South's heavyweights who worked there during the 1970s include Russ Spooner, Bob Canada, Kemosabi Joe Johnson, Fred Hardy, and Robert W. Morgan (not the same Morgan that worked at KHJ) though. The Inimitable MojoMan (Sid D. Grubbs) also worked there in the 1970s. By the 1980s, WORD faced declining audience shares from FM competitors WANS and WFBC-FM, and switched to various formats before going dark in 1989. In October 1990, WORD signed back on as a simulcast of WFBC from Greenville, as both stations switched to news/talk; in 1997, WFBC became WYRD.

In 2002, Entercom Communications moved the "News Radio WORD" format from the weaker 910 AM, which previously held the WORD callsign, to 950 AM. The programming at 950 AM was then moved to 910 AM, along with the WSPA calls. WSPA at 910 has since been sold and is now WOLI.

WORD's transmitter is located near the Spartanburg Community College campus (3 miles northwest of downtown Spartanburg) at 245 Broadcast Drive. Its general coverage area is from Gaffney to Greer (Spartanburg metro), with secondary coverage in the Greenville area. Although WORD transmits with 5,000 watts of power like its counterpart, WYRD, its signal is somewhat stronger due to its lower dial position.

The station added WYRD-FM, now at 98.9 on the dial (originally stationed at 106.3), as a second simulcast partner in 2008. The simulcast continued until the switch from talk to sports by the AM stations.

Until its change in format from talk to sports on March 29, 2014, News Radio WORD carried Russ and Lisa, Mike Gallagher, Coast to Coast AM, Rush Limbaugh, Kim Komando, Lars Larson, Dave Ramsey, Sean Hannity, and Bob McLain.

On March 23, 2022, WORD rebranded as "The Fan Upstate" and switched affiliations from ESPN Radio to CBS Sports Radio and BetQL Network.

On September 29, 2025, WORD changed its format from sports to conservative talk, branded as "Upstate Red".
