= Mike Gallagher (political commentator) =

American conservative commentator and radio host

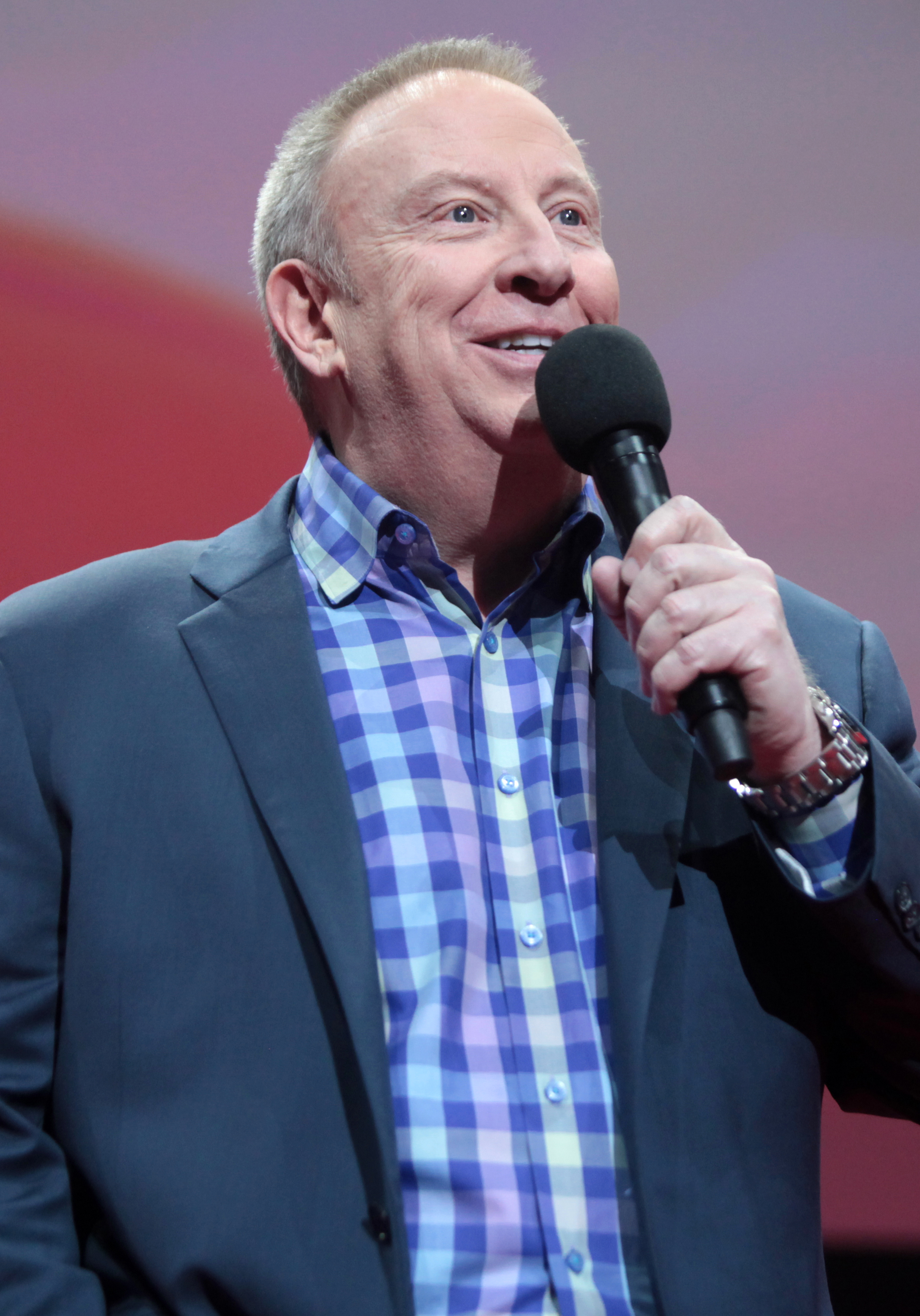
- Gallagher in 2016
- Born: April 7, 1960 (age 66); Dayton, Ohio, U.S.
- Education: Chaminade-Julienne High School, Dayton, Ohio; attended University of Dayton and Wright State University
- Occupations: Radio personality Television host Political commentator Author
- Employer(s): Salem Radio Networks; Fox News Channel
- Known for: Commentary on current events and social issues
- Spouse: Denise Newlen (m. 1994; died 2008)
- Children: 4
- Website: www.mikeonline.com

Mike Gallagher (born April 7, 1960) is an American radio host and conservative political commentator. He is the host of The Mike Gallagher Show, a nationally syndicated radio program that airs throughout the United States on Salem Radio Network and is also a FOX News Channel Contributor and guest host. According to Talkers magazine, Gallagher is the tenth most-listened-to radio talk show host in the United States.

== Early life ==
Gallagher was born on April 7, 1960 in Dayton, Ohio. He attended Chaminade-Julienne High School in Dayton, graduating in 1978. During high school, he cultivated an early passion for communication, participating actively in the school's radio and television station as well as theater productions.

Gallagher attended the University of Dayton and Wright State University in Ohio after graduating from high school in 1978.

== Career ==
=== Radio ===
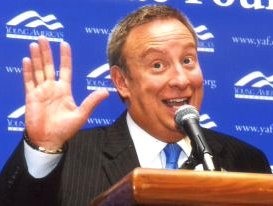
Gallagher at the Young America's Foundation annual event, (August 8, 2008), Washington, D.C.

As a 17-year-old high school senior in Dayton, Ohio, Gallagher talked his way into an on-air shift at WAVI. From there he joined WFBC in Greenville, South Carolina, eventually becoming station manager. He then became an on-air host in Albany, New York, on WGY. Gallagher went on to New York City, where he spent two years as morning drive host on WABC.

In 1998, The Mike Gallagher Show was launched nationally with 12 radio stations. As of early 2011, Gallagher was the sixth most listened-to talk radio host in America with over four million weekly listeners. He is heard daily in New York City, Los Angeles, Chicago, Dallas, Houston, Detroit, Atlanta, and Philadelphia as well as in small, medium and major markets all over the country. According to the Benchmark Company, he is the 8th most-recognized talk radio personality in America. Gallagher has also been featured in numerous magazines and newspapers including The New York Times, The Wall Street Journal, Time, and Forbes. Talkers Magazine has named Gallagher one of the 100 most influential talk hosts in America for eleven consecutive years.

Gallagher's show hosts many high-profile politicians as guests, including former Speaker of the House Newt Gingrich, former US President George W. Bush, Speaker of the House John Boehner, Republican presidential candidate John McCain during his 2008 electoral run, Vice President Dick Cheney while in office, and then-Secretary of Defense Donald Rumsfeld.

=== Television ===
Gallagher co-hosted a morning news program with Dawn Meadows on Dayton's then-NBC affiliate WKEF in 1983. He is a Fox News Channel contributor and sometimes co-host, making frequent appearances on many Fox News Channel shows.

== Books ==
- Gallagher, Mike (June 28, 2005). Surrounded by Idiots: Fighting Liberal Lunacy in America. New York, New York: William Morrow and Company. ISBN 978-0060737986.

In the summer of 2005, Gallagher authored Surrounded by Idiots: Fighting Liberal Lunacy in America, which became a New York Times bestseller (#27 on the extended bestseller list). The Times reviewed the book writing, "You might disagree with the man's politics, but dang, you gotta love a guy who slaughters a steer live on the radio just to annoy the ideologues at People for the Ethical Treatment of Animals, then gives the meat to the poor. Checkmate. Fans of Gallagher will love the book, and even those liberal loons might enjoy reading it just to play Spot the Inconsistencies."

- Gallagher, Mike (August 28, 2012). 50 Things Liberals Love to Hate. New York, New York: Threshold Editions. ISBN 978-1451679250.

Former Speaker of the House Newt Gingrich said 50 Things Liberals Love to Hate "is smart, funny, and uses satire and wit to take apart the left. If Jon Stewart had writers who were conservative, they'd write a book like this." On September 10, 2012 Gallagher gave a reading of his new book at the Richard Nixon Presidential Library.

== Honors, awards, distinctions ==
Gallagher has been honored with a number of awards and distinctions in his broadcast career, including:

- Named one of the 100 most influential talk radio hosts in America (the "Heavy Hundred") by Talkers Magazine for multiple years, including a #9 ranking in 2025 and for at least eleven consecutive years earlier in his career.
- Ranked among the top talk radio hosts by Talkers Magazine in various years, including as the sixth most-listened-to host in 2011 (with over 4 million weekly listeners), the eighth most influential in 2006, and the tenth most-listened-to more recently (with estimates of 3.75 million to 7 million weekly listeners).
- Nominated for "Nationally Syndicated Personality of the Year" in the talk radio category by Radio & Records magazine in 2006.
- Awarded the New York City Sergeants Benevolent Association "Heroism Award" in April 2015 for his steadfast support of law enforcement.
- Ranked as the eighth most-recognized talk radio personality in America by the Benchmark Company.
- Honored on the Food for the Poor podcast "Beyond the Plate" in 2025 for his philanthropic efforts, including raising millions of dollars through his show and listeners to combat hunger and support related causes (inspired by his late wife, Denise).

Gallagher was inducted into the Chaminade Julienne High School Distinguished Hall of Fame on October 1, 2009.

== Causes ==
On May 8, 2006, Gallagher used his show to raise money for the creation of homes in poverty-stricken areas of Jamaica in conjunction with Food for the Poor, during a live broadcast in the Jamaican national capital. Gallagher is also the namesake of his main charity, Gallagher's Army: The Mike Gallagher Show Charitable Foundation, which he founded in 2005 after he began asking his listeners and others to support American military families. In 2008 Gallagher expanded his efforts by founding the Gallagher's Army: Fallen Officer Fund, which gathers funds from his listeners and others to support the families of police officers who have fallen in the line of duty.

Gallagher has made his views on the protesting of American war dead upon their return from theatres of war, using his air time to try to prevent such protests from taking place. On October 6, 2006, Gallagher convinced the controversial Topeka, Kansas-based Westboro Baptist Church to appear on air with an hour of air time in exchange for not picketing a funeral for victims from the West Nickel Mines School shooting near Nickel Mines, Pennsylvania. Initially, Gallagher offered the organization money not to picket the funeral. With this gesture being accused of being blood money, the syndicated radio host gave the church an hour to appear on air. The Amish funerals went on peacefully after the contract signed with WBC stipulated a $500,000 fine if there were picketers anywhere near the funerals.

Following plans by the Westboro Baptist Church to protest funerals of victims of the Virginia Tech massacre, Gallagher offered the group three hours of airtime in exchange for an agreement not to protest these funerals. The WBC was the in-studio guests of Gallagher's program for its entirety on April 24, 2007. He has made a similar agreement with Westboro concerning possible protests at the funerals of those killed in Tucson, Arizona, on January 8, 2011, despite the fact that emergency legislation passed on January 12, 2011, makes such protests illegal in Arizona.

== Views ==
Gallagher's political views are characterized by trenchant criticism of Liberals with strong support for Republican figures and policies. This can be seen in his books Surrounded by Idiots: Fighting Liberal Lunacy in America (2005) and 50 Things Liberals Love to Hate (2012), which use satire to expose Leftist ideologies. Of this approach, Gallagher says, "I think you can be conservative and fight for what you believe in without being mean-spirited or bash people or be ugly about it." Economically, Gallagher aligns with pro-Trump policies, celebrating recent gains under the administration while dismissing Leftist critiques. In discussions with economist Stephen Moore, he highlighted "jobs up, costs down," attributing strong economic performance to Republican policies. The so-called "affordability crisis" he attributes to a Democrat administration.

== Personal life ==
Gallagher was born in Dayton, Ohio. He attended Chaminade-Julienne High School in downtown Dayton (graduating in 1978), where he was active in the school radio and television station, theater (lead roles all four years), the school band, and chorus. Gallagher is of Irish descent.

Gallagher was married to Denise Newlen from July 24, 1993 until her death on June 29, 2008, one day shy of her 52nd birthday, from endometrial cancer. They had four sons. Gallagher has described his family as his proudest achievement.

From September 6–11, 2011, Gallagher made a week-long cameo in the Broadway show Memphis, stating it was the culmination of a lifelong dream.
