= WESC-FM =

Country music radio station in Greenville, South Carolina

- Greenville, South Carolina; United States
- Broadcast area: Upstate South Carolina and Western North Carolina
- Frequency: 92.5 MHz (HD Radio)
- Branding: 92.5 WESC

Programming
- Format: Classic country
- Subchannels: HD2: Bluegrass music
- Affiliations: Motor Racing Network; Performance Racing Network

Ownership
- Owner: iHeartMedia, Inc.; (iHM Licenses, LLC)
- Sister stations: WESC, WGVL, WMYI, WSSL-FM, WROO

History
- First air date: March 1948
- Call sign meaning: Easley, Seneca, Clemson (original communities served)

Technical information
- Licensing authority: FCC
- Facility ID: 4679
- Class: C
- ERP: 95,000 watts
- HAAT: 610 meters (2,000 ft)
- Transmitter coordinates: 35°08′16.4″N 82°36′30.4″W
- Repeater: 660 WESC (Greenville)

Links
- Public license information: Public file; LMS
- Webcast: Listen Live; Listen Live (HD2)
- Website: wescfm.iheart.com

WESC-FM (92.5 MHz) is a commercial radio station in Greenville, South Carolina, serving the Upstate region, including Greenville, Spartanburg and Anderson, South Carolina, as well as Asheville, North Carolina. It airs a classic country radio format and is owned by iHeartMedia, Inc. The station goes by the name "92.5 WESC" and its slogan is "Carolina's Best Country And Your All-Time Favorites". iHeart owns three country stations in the market: WSSL-FM 100.5 has a contemporary country format, while WESC 660 AM and WESC-FM 92.5 simulcast classic country hits.

The studios and offices are on North Main Street in downtown Greenville. The transmitter is along the North Carolina/South Carolina border, off YMCA Camp Road, east of Cedar Mountain, North Carolina. WESC-FM broadcasts using HD Radio.

== History ==
=== Early years ===
WESC-FM signed on the air in March 1948 as the FM sister station to WESC 660, simulcasting its country music format. In the late 1960s, WESC-FM switched to beautiful music while WESC 660 remained a country outlet. WESC-AM-FM returned to a country music simulcast in the 1980s, although there were times the AM station aired separate programming, leaning toward classic country.

WESC-AM-FM were acquired in 1998 by San Antonio-based Clear Channel Communications. In 2014, Clear Channel changed its name to iHeartMedia.

In 2000, the simulcast was split apart. WESC-FM retained its country format, while WESC 660 was leased to the Radio Training Network, which programmed a Christian talk and teaching format in conjunction with 89.3 WLFJ-FM. The local marketing agreement (LMA) ended in August 2019, after which the two stations returned to their prior simulcast.

=== Move toward classic country ===
In 2001, WESC-FM adjusted its format to classic-leaning country, in a move to separate itself from co-owned 100.5 WSSL-FM, which has a more youthful country sound. Although there is overlap with WSSL-FM, WESC distinguished itself by playing more 'genuine/raw' current selections along with hits from the early 1990s and before, sometimes going back to the 1970s.

In the late 2010s, the station abandoned all current or recurrent hits and now strictly plays country music from the 1980s through the 2000s, with an occasional 1970s or earlier and song from the early 2010s played.

WESC is the area's network affiliate for Clemson Tigers athletics as well as NASCAR, often calling itself "Your Racin' Station".

WESC-FM has a half-century heritage as a country music station. In the 1980s and 90s, it was sometimes #1 in the Greenville-Spartanburg Arbitron ratings.

=== Country Heartlines ===
WESC-FM was the home station for the syndicated radio show "Country Heartlines", hosted by John Crenshaw. A nationalized version of Crenshaw’s Cryin’ Lovin’ Laugin’ or Leavin’ show, the program was popular in the 1990s and at one time was carried on over 80 FM stations across the country. The show consisted of a format of country songs played in between callers calling in with a mix of relationship and love related problems, of which Crenshaw and other listeners would give advice and a lending ear. The syndicated show fully ended in 2011.

== Transmitter ==
WESC-FM has an effective radiated power (ERP) of 100,000 watts, the highest power permitted for most FM stations. The tower has a height above average terrain (HAAT) of 610 meters (2,001 ft). The transmitter is located near Caesars Head State Park in northern Greenville County, near the North Carolina state line.

WESC-FM can be heard across most of Northwestern or Upstate South Carolina and Western North Carolina, as well as part of Northeastern Georgia and a small portion of Eastern Tennessee. The signal comes close to other nearby radio markets, including Charlotte, Atlanta, Columbia, Knoxville and the Tri-Cities. The station also has an auxiliary transmitter that operates at 100,000 watts ERP which is shared with the main WESC AM tower.
