= WESC (AM) =

Radio station in Greenville, South Carolina

Simulcast of WESC-FM, Greenville, SC
- Greenville, South Carolina; United States
- Broadcast area: Upstate South Carolina
- Frequency: 660 kHz
- Branding: 92.5 WESC

Programming
- Format: Classic country
- Affiliations: Premiere Networks

Ownership
- Owner: iHeartMedia; (iHM Licenses, LLC)
- Sister stations: WESC-FM, WGVL, WMYI, WROO, WSSL-FM

History
- First air date: March 1947
- Former call signs: WESC (1947–2000); WLFJ (2000–2019)
- Call sign meaning: Easley, Seneca, Clemson (original areas served) or Eastern South Carolina

Technical information
- Licensing authority: FCC
- Facility ID: 4678
- Class: D
- Power: 5,000 watts (days only)
- Transmitter coordinates: 34°53′10″N 82°28′3″W

Links
- Public license information: Public file; LMS
- Webcast: Listen live (via iHeartRadio)
- Website: wescfm.iheart.com

WESC (660 AM) is a commercial radio station licensed to Greenville, South Carolina. It simulcasts a classic country format with sister station WESC-FM (92.5). Owned by iHeartMedia, it serves Upstate South Carolina with studios on North Main Street in Greenville.

By day, WESC is powered at 5,000 watts, using a non-directional antenna. Because 660 AM is a clear channel frequency reserved for Class A WFAN in New York City, WESC must go off the air at night to avoid interference. The transmitter is on Saluda Lake Road, near White Horse Road (U.S. Route 25) in Berea.

== History ==
=== 660 in Dixie ===
WESC signed on the air in March 1947. It was owned by the Greenville Broadcasting Company with studios on College Street. It was a network affiliate of the Mutual Broadcasting System.

For many years, it played country music, branded as "660 in Dixie". In 1948, sister station WESC-FM went on the air. Both stations simulcast from 1948 until the late 1960s, when WESC-FM switched to beautiful music, while WESC continued as a country outlet. WESC-FM later returned to country music. Throughout the 1970s and 1980s, WESC-AM-FM were frequently the highest rated stations in the Greenville radio market.

In the 1990s, WESC continued to simulcast WESC-FM most of the time. But in 1994, WESC picked up the nationally syndicated sports radio show, The Fabulous Sports Babe. It was hosted by Nancy Donnellan, a rare female sports show host in that era.

=== Christian Radio ===
WESC carried its country music format until March 1, 2000. At that point, it was purchased by Clear Channel Communications. Clear Channel leased it to the Radio Training Network, which owns non-commercial station 89.3 WLFJ-FM. RTN operated 660 AM under a local marketing agreement (LMA). The station adopted the call sign WLFJ to match its parent station. RTN programmed a listener-supported Christian talk and teaching format, most recently branded as His Radio Talk.

In August 2019, the LMA ended, and the station returned to the WESC call letters and country music simulcast. The previous programming continues to air on WLFJ-FM's fourth HD Radio channel and FM translator 92.9 W225AZ.

=== Reduction in power ===
Even though it could not broadcast at night, for decades, WESC had been powered at 50,000 watts, the maximum for AM stations. It was able to use that high power thanks to a directional antenna with a multi-tower array.

As of March 28, 2020, WESC's towers were taken down, due to development of a subdivision taking place on the tower site. WESC was silent until January 22, 2021, and now broadcasts at 5,000 watts using a single tower. It continues to go off the air at night to avoid interference with 660 WFAN New York.
