= WYRD (AM) =

Radio station in Greenville, South Carolina

- Greenville, South Carolina; United States
- Broadcast area: Upstate South Carolina
- Frequency: 1330 kHz
- Branding: Upstate Red

Programming
- Language: English
- Format: Conservative talk radio
- Affiliations: Fox News Radio; Premiere Networks; Townhall News; Westwood One

Ownership
- Owner: Audacy, Inc.; (Audacy License, LLC)
- Sister stations: WFBC-FM; WORD; WROQ; WTPT; WYRD-FM

History
- First air date: November 23, 1924 (Knoxville, Tennessee); May 3, 1933 (Greenville)
- Former call signs: WFBC (1924–1997)
- Call sign meaning: "Word" (Y substitutes for the O, used in sister station WORD)

Technical information
- Licensing authority: FCC
- Facility ID: 34389
- Class: B
- Power: 5,000 watts
- Transmitter coordinates: 34°51′19.4″N 82°25′25.4″W
- Repeaters: 950 WORD (Spartanburg); 98.9 WYRD-HD2 (Spartanburg)

Links
- Public license information: Public file; LMS
- Webcast: Listen live (via Audacy); Listen live (via iHeartRadio)
- Website: www.audacy.com/upstatered

WYRD (1330 kHz), branded as "Upstate Red", is a conservative talk-formatted commercial AM radio station, licensed by the Federal Communications Commission to Audacy, Inc. in Greenville, South Carolina, which serves Upstate South Carolina. Studios and transmitter site are located in Greenville.

The station power is 5 kW, non-directional daytime and three-way directional at night. Programming is simulcast on WORD (950 AM) in Spartanburg, and WYRD-FM’s HD2 subchannel.

== History ==
The station has traditionally traced its history to May 1933, the date when it began broadcasting from Greenville. However, Federal Communications Commission (FCC) records list the station's first license date as November 4, 1924, tracing its origin to the original license, issued as WFBC to the First Baptist Church of Knoxville, Tennessee. The station, designed by University of Tennessee senior Andy Ring, was a gift by Mrs. J. B. Jones, in memory of her mother, Mrs. W. S. Hall. Following a series of test transmissions, WFBC made its formal Knoxville debut on November 23, 1924.

On December 9, 1932, the Federal Radio Commission approved transferring the WFBC license from Virgil V. Evans to the Greenville News-Piedmont Company, as part of a move from Knoxville to Greenville. At the time, WFBC operated on 1200 kHz with 50 watts of power. In 1934, the station moved to 1300 kHz, and on January 8, 1935, the FCC approved increasing the station's daytime power to 5,000 watts. In 1941, with the implementation of the North American Regional Broadcasting Agreement, stations on 1300 kHz were transferred to 1330 kHz.

In later years, WFBC was known for its top-40 format. In 1997, the station's call letters, which continue to be used by WFBC-FM, were changed to WYRD. Until the format change from talk to sports on March 29, 2014, News Radio WORD carried Russ and Lisa, Mike Gallagher, Coast to Coast AM, Rush Limbaugh, Kim Komando, Lars Larson, Dave Ramsey, Sean Hannity and Bob McLain. WYRD-FM now airs the talk format that was once simulcast on WORD (AM), and on the FM station starting in 2008.

WYRD and its associated FM translator signals became "ESPN Upstate" in February 2014. The station began with ESPN Radio programming, except during the afternoon drive time slot, which was hosted locally by Greenville-Spartanburg radio veteran Greg McKinney. Later in 2014, McKinney's show "The Huddle" moved to early afternoons, and Mark Sturgis took over the afternoon drive slot. McKinney retired from the station in January 2019, and the early afternoon show was taken over by Marc Ryan. Sturgis has had extended absences from the station for health reasons, and a variety of substitute hosts filled in.

On March 23, 2022, WYRD and its FM translators rebranded as "The Fan Upstate" and switched affiliations from ESPN Radio to CBS Sports Radio and BetQL Network.

On September 29, 2025, WYRD and WORD changed their format from sports (which continues on WFBC-FM-HD3) to conservative talk, branded as "Upstate Red".
