= WAIM =

Coordinates: 34°31′52.4″N 82°36′49.5″W

Currently silent
- Anderson, South Carolina; United States
- Broadcast area: Upstate South Carolina
- Frequency: 1230 kHz
- Branding: "Newstalk 1230"

Programming
- Format: Talk radio
- Affiliations: Genesis Communications Network; Premiere Networks; Townhall; Red Apple Media; Westwood One

Ownership
- Owner: Palmetto Broadcasting Company, Inc.

History
- First air date: April 1935
- Call sign meaning: "Where Agriculture and Industry Meet"

Technical information
- Licensing authority: FCC
- Facility ID: 51346
- Class: C
- Power: 1,000 watts unlimited

Links
- Public license information: Public file; LMS
- Webcast: Listen live
- Website: waim.us

WAIM (1230 AM) is a commercial radio station in Anderson, South Carolina. It is owned by the Palmetto Broadcasting Company. Until going silent in 2026, WAIM aired a talk radio format. The studios and transmitter tower are on Old Williamston Road. WAIM is powered at 1,000 watts, using a non-directional antenna.

== Programming ==
Weekdays on WAIM began with a local news and interview program, The Rick Driver Show. The rest of the weekday schedule was nationally syndicated conservative talk programs: The Chris Plante Show, The Vince Show with Vince Coglianese, The Sean Hannity Show, The Mark Levin Show, and Coast to Coast AM with George Noory.

Weekends included specialty shows on money, health, religion, pets, gardening, farming, guns, and car repair. Weekend syndicated shows included Doug Stephan's Good Day, Our American Stories with Lee Habeeb, The Cat's Roundtable with John Catsimatidis, Paul Parent's Garden Club, Tom Gresham's Gun Talk, The Larry Kudlow Show and weekend editions of Coast to Coast AM. Most hours began with an update from Townhall News. In the fall, WAIM broadcast T. L. Hanna High School Yellow Jackets football games with play-by-play from Christopher White and color from Frank Alexander.

== History ==
WAIM signed on the air in April 1935. Station owner Wilton E. Hall also owned The Anderson Independent and Daily Mail newspapers. The radio station was among the earliest to go on the air in South Carolina. It later became an affiliate of the CBS Radio Network.

In the 1940s and 1950s, Glenn Warnock was the general manager. Some of the radio personalities who worked at WAIM in the 1940s, 1950s, and 1960s were Audrey Hunt, Doc Durham, Jimmy Scribner, Bob Poole, Marshall Gailiard, Al Joseph, Betty Black, and Ken Rogers. Ansel Guthrie, an upstate bluegrass and Southern gospel pioneer, hosted a radio show called "Knee Deep In Bluegrass". Hall later owned WCAC-FM 101.1 (now WROQ).

In the late 1970s, the FM station became WAIM-FM. In 1978, WAIM-FM 101.1 became Rock 101. WAIM AM 1230 became "Anderson Country", playing country music. In 1982, the FM station's call sign was changed to WCKN.

In the 1980s and 90s, more people were tuning into FM stations for their music. In 1992, WAIM's music ended. The station switched to news/talk, changing its slogan to "NewsRadio 1230". National talk show hosts included Rush Limbaugh, Laura Ingraham, Sean Hannity, and George Noory. In 2008, Bob Bierrman returned to the station for the first time since 1973 to do a weekend talk show. He left the station in September 2008.

WAIM's main competitors had been WHQA 103.1 FM which would broadcast a morning talk show and WANS 1280 AM which would broadcasts a talk and sports format. WHQA has since switched to a Christian radio format and WANS has gone dark.

During the latter part of 2008, the WAIM website was changed to include an online version of the popular "Trading Post" radio trading service. In early 2009, WAIM NetTV was added that streams live events, including Anderson County Council Meetings, and other governmental meetings.

WAIM went silent on May 29, 2026.
