= Tom Ervin =

American judge and politician (born 1952)

Member of the South Carolina House of Representatives from the 7th district
- In office 1979–1983

Personal details
- Born: Thomas Jonathan Ervin; May 14, 1952 (age 74) Anderson, South Carolina, U.S.
- Party: Independent (2014–present)
- Other political affiliations: Republican (2005–2014); Democratic (1978–2005)
- Spouse: Kathryn
- Children: 2
- Education: Erskine College; University of South Carolina School of Law
- Website: Official website

Thomas Jonathan Ervin (born May 14, 1952) is an American attorney, former judge, one-time politician and former radio station owner. A past member of the Republican Party, he also served in the South Carolina House of Representatives from 1979 through 1983. He had been running for Governor of South Carolina in the 2014 gubernatorial election as an Independent, but in late October he dropped out and endorsed Democratic nominee Vincent Sheheen.

== Career ==
Ervin graduated from Erskine College with a bachelor's degree in history, and then the University of South Carolina School of Law in 1977. He was elected to serve in the South Carolina House of Representatives, representing the seventh district, as a member of the Democratic Party. He served from 1979 through 1983. Ervin has not held any type of public office since this term expired in 1983. He served two terms in the state House, and then served on the South Carolina Workers’ Compensation Commission. He served a circuit court judge for 14 years.

In 2005, when House Speaker David Wilkins was named United States Ambassador to Canada, Ervin ran in the special election to replace him as a member of the Republican Party. He lost the election. He then challenged Jean H. Toal, a member of the South Carolina Supreme Court, in a 1996 election, which he also lost. Ervin desired to run against Nikki Haley, the incumbent Governor of South Carolina, in the Republican primary for the 2014 gubernatorial election. In the November 2014 general election Ervin had planned to appear as a petition candidate for governor, after the South Carolina Election Commission certified his candidacy on July 23, 2013. However, in late October, he dropped out and endorsed Democratic nominee Vincent Sheheen suddenly without any real explanation.

Ervin and his wife practice law together in Greenville, South Carolina. Ervin also purchased WRIX-FM, WRIX and WANS, three Anderson County radio stations, in 2013. However, in late 2014, he donated the radio stations to a local non-profit religious foundation that owns and operates local southern gospel radio stations.

== Personal life ==
Ervin and his wife, Kathryn, have two children. Ervin is a born-again Christian.
