= WROP =

WROP refers to the following broadcasting stations in the United States:

- WROP-LP, a low-power radio station (92.7 FM) licensed to serve Columbia, South Carolina
- WABB (AM), a radio station (1390 AM) licensed to serve Belton, South Carolina, which held the call sign WROP from 2008 to 2012
