= T. L. Hanna High School =

T.L. Hanna High School
- T.L. Hanna shield

Location
- 2600 Highway 81 North; Anderson, South Carolina 29621; United States; 34.5671°N 82.62329°W

Information
- Type: Public high school
- Established: 1961 (65 years ago)
- School district: Anderson School District Five
- CEEB code: 410050
- Principal: Ryan Roberts
- Staff: 103.00 (FTE)
- Grades: 9–12
- Enrollment: 1,994 (2023–2024)
- Student to teacher ratio: 19.36
- Colors: Vegas gold and white
- Nickname: Yellow Jackets
- Website: tlhanna.anderson5.net

T. L. Hanna High School is located at 2600 Highway 81 North, outside the city limits of Anderson, South Carolina, United States. It is one of two high schools in Anderson School District Five and has a population of nearly 2,100 students. On July 1, 2015, Shawn Tobin was appointed as principal taking the place of long time principal Sheila Hilton, who retired. In 2019, Tobin retired to be replaced by T.L. Hanna graduate, Walter Mayfield. Mayfield was subsequently replaced in 2026 by Ryan Roberts. In 1999, the school was named "Palmetto's Finest" by the South Carolina Department of Education. In 2000, it was named a National Blue Ribbon School by the U.S. Department of Education.

== History ==
Before T.L. Hanna High School, there was a Boys High School (located at what is now the Hanna-Westside Extension Campus) and a Girls High School. In 1951, Girl's High School changed its name to T.L. Hanna High School after its first principal Thomas Lucas Hanna. In 1961, the school moved to a new site on Marchbanks Avenue, the current site of McCants Middle School, and became co-ed in 1962.

Prior to 1971, T.L. Hanna was Anderson School District 5's all-white high school (Westside was the African-American school); in 1971, the district integrated after the Supreme Court's 1954 ruling in Brown v. Board of Education. During the first year of integration, each grade's student government had two co-presidents, two co-vice presidents, etc., one white and one black.

In 1992, the school moved to its current location on Highway 81. In 1996, McDuffie High School closed as an independent vocational/non-college preparatory high school and became the Hanna-Westside Extension Campus, a change which increased and substantially diversified T.L. Hanna's student population (prior to 1996, many African-American students who were zoned for Hanna attended McDuffie, and the school's population made it state 3A instead of 4A). It has been an International Baccalaureate school since 2010.

== Athletics ==
=== State championships ===
- Basketball – Boys: 1960, 1966, 1967
- Basketball – Girls: 1981
- Cross Country – Boys: 1981, 1982, 1983, 1984
- Cross Country – Girls: 1993, 1994
- Golf – Boys: 1974, 1983, 1993, 1994, 2023, 2024, 2025
- Golf - Girls: 2024, 2025
- Soccer – Boys: 1980, 1996
- Soccer – Girls: 2012
- Tennis – Boys: 1974, 1975, 1976, 1977, 1978, 1979, 1983, 1985, 1987, 1988, 1989, 2021
- Tennis – Girls: 1987, 2013,
- Track – Boys: 1960, 1963, 1964, 1965, 1969, 1975, 1977, 1979, 1981, 1982, 1983, 1984, 1992, 1993
- Track – Girls: 1993, 1994

== Notable alumni ==
- Chadwick Boseman (1976–2020) (Class of 1995), actor, writer, and director, Marshall, 42, Get On Up, Draft Day, Captain America: Civil War, Black Panther
- Martavis Bryant (born 1991), wide receiver for the Dallas Cowboys in the NFL
- Adam Hill (born 1997), former professional baseball pitcher
- Preston Jones (born 1970), football player
- James "Radio" Kennedy (1946–2019) inspired the feature film, Radio. Cuba Gooding Jr. portrayed Kennedy in the film. A large statue of "Radio" is located on the school grounds today.
- Nicki Carlson-Lee (born 1974) (Class of 1991) champion karate point-fighter and member of the 2000 Olympic taekwondo team.
- Zacch Pickens (born 2000), defensive tackle for the Kansas City Chiefs
- James Michael Tyler (1962–2021) (Class of 1980), actor who played Gunther on the sitcom Friends

== MTV's Made ==
MTV came to T.L. Hanna High School in September 2007 to cast for Made, a reality show featuring makeovers of high school students.
