= Robert Ford (politician) =

American politician

Member of the South Carolina Senate from the 42nd district
- In office 1993–2013
- Preceded by: Herbert Fielding
- Succeeded by: Marlon Kimpson

Member of the Charleston City Council
- In office 1974–1992

Personal details
- Born: December 26, 1948 (age 77) New Orleans, Louisiana
- Party: Democratic
- Education: Grambling State University, Wayne State University
- Occupation: Politician
- Website: Senator Robert Ford

Robert Ford (born December 26, 1948) is an American politician who served as a Democratic member of the South Carolina Senate from 1993 to 2013, representing District 42, which is located in Charleston. From 1974 to 1992, he served as a member of the Charleston City Council.

Originally involved in the civil rights movement, several of Ford's public statements and legislative proposals as senator attracted media attention and controversy. He finished in third place in the June 2010 Democratic primary election for Governor of South Carolina. He resigned on May 31, 2013, in the midst of a political scandal on public funds spent in adult establishments.

== Personal life ==
Ford was born in New Orleans, Louisiana; his parents were leaders in the African American community. Ford attended Wayne State University and Grambling State University, from which he was expelled in 1969 before graduating for leading civil rights demonstrations. He was expelled by the university, despite it being historically black, because it relied on public funds which were controlled by a state government opposed to desegregation. Ford was a member of the Southern Christian Leadership Conference staff from 1966 to 1972 and worked for Martin Luther King Jr. (continuing after King was assassinated) as a member of an advance team of the 1968 Poor People's Campaign. He was arrested 73 times for participating in protests during the civil rights movement. In 1973, he won a draft evasion trial on basis of conscientious objection. Ford worked as a car salesman and later became a full-time legislator. Ford is a lifelong bachelor.

== Political career ==
Ford was elected to serve on the Charleston City Council, where he served from 1974 to 1992. During this time, Councilman Ford was indicted on forgery charges after an annexation petition for the Neck area included the names of dead people. However, he was not convicted.

Ford ran for the State Senate and was elected on November 3, 1992, taking office in 1993. He was reelected in 1996, 2000, 2004, and 2008. He served on the Senate Committees on Banking and Insurance, Corrections and Penology, General, Invitations, Judiciary, and Labor, Commerce and Industry, and was the ranking Democrat on several committees. Ford is a member of the South Carolina Legislative Black Caucus. Ford resigned on May 31, 2013 during a brewing campaign finance scandal.

Ford has been described as entertaining, controversial, and politically incorrect. He supported Hillary Clinton in the 2008 Democratic presidential primaries and questioned Barack Obama's appeal to white voters. Ford later apologized for his comments, stating that any Democrat could win and that he had supported other African American candidates for president in the past. Ford's comments prompted a primary challenge in 2008 from Charleston lawyer Dwayne Green. In the beginning of his campaign, Green managed to raise double the amount of campaign funds Ford raised, and although Ford's fundraising improved he for the first time attended a candidate forum to receive free publicity, because his campaign had financial difficulty resulting from the contested primary and a fire in his home. Green was defeated in the primary election by a wide margin. Ford praised Obama's election in November 2008, but criticized South Carolina Congressman James Clyburn's family for allegedly attempting to profit off Obama's victory.

=== Political positions ===
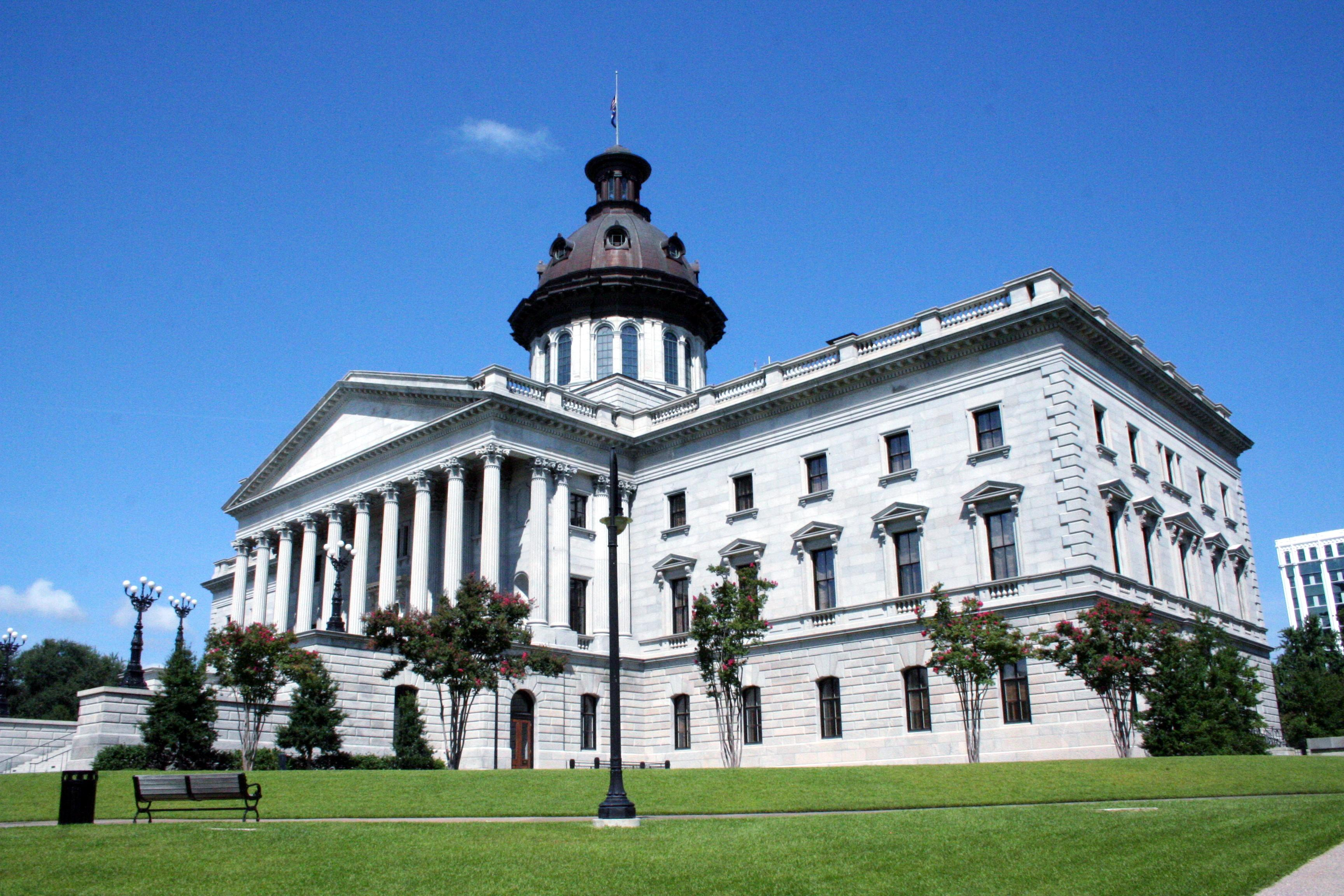
South Carolina State House

As senator, Ford has introduced many bills with only a small number becoming law, but has been more successful in contributing to compromise bills. After becoming senator, Ford attempted to have the Confederate flag removed from the South Carolina State House. It was the last state capitol to display a Confederate battle flag, and Ford had picketed the building in the 1960s as a symbol of discrimination. Following years of debate, the flag was moved to a nearby monument with the adoption of a compromise bill authored by Ford. He was responsible for the passage of a 1998 bill that paired Martin Luther King, Jr. Day with Confederate Memorial Day as paid holidays. Ford stated that he hoped the legislation would improve race relations in South Carolina.

Ford described the election of judges by popular vote as a major goal and supported increasing the number of judges. He supported giving more authority to law enforcement, including the ability to search people on parole and probation without warrant, making attempted murder a crime with lifelong sentence, and increasing penalties for possession of illegal guns. Ford is a proponent of stricter regulations of the financial industry. He sponsored a 2006 ban on payday lending, which was shown to discriminate against African Americans. In 2008, Ford blocked all House bills in the Senate until the bill was taken up. The bill failed in the Senate by a close vote and was heavily amended so lenders would not be banned but restricted. The bill then passed with Ford voting in favor but failed to advance after changes made in the House. A bill preventing consumers from taking out more than one loan at a time passed the House in 2009. Ford supported offshore drilling, stating conservation was not a priority for most citizens of the state. Geologists believe there is little oil to be found off the South Carolina coast. Ford wants to prevent the widening of Interstate 26 through Charleston, calling instead for a study for transportation needs. Ford emphasized the need for more funding for school programs, which he claimed is necessary due to the small number of pupils attending college and to remedy lacks of knowledge in geography and civics, which he wants reinstated as a school subject. Ford was told about favoritism, intimidation and racism in the South Carolina Highway Patrol and publicized it with Glenn McConnell. Subsequently, director and deputy director of the South Carolina Department of Public Safety resigned under pressure from governor Mark Sanford.

Ford sponsored legislation defining a hate crime "as an assault, intimidation or threat based on 'actual or perceived' race, religion, color, sex, age, national origin and sexual orientation." He also introduced several bills concerning gay rights in lodging, hospital visitation rights and partnerships. His partnership bill would provide for civil unions in South Carolina. The effort was judged by state senator Mike Fair as predetermined to fail, but Ford cited the Democratic National Committee's platform on the issue and argued that Barack Obama's election showed that a change should be attempted. Even if passed, the measure would be unenforceable, due to a constitutional amendment banning unions similar to marriage in South Carolina. Ford worked to outlaw profanity and saggy pants and to keep music from minors that is "profane, vulgar, lewd, lascivious or indecent." Ford argued he did not expect these proposals to be approved but wanted to start a discussion specifically targeting young African American men's fashion as well as rap music. He stated: "You don't have to emulate prisoners no more. You can emulate somebody like Barack Obama."

Ford often opposed governor Mark Sanford's political goals, arguing his proposed reforms were unwanted by the public, and he mostly opposed Sanford's fiscal policy and worked to override budget vetoes by the governor, claiming he was removed from the interests of citizens. An exception were security measures for the State House complex which Ford agreed were too costly. He also opposed Sanford's goal to increase the number of roll calls in the State Senate and voted against a 2008 immigration reform bill favored by Sanford, stating it would be an ineffective deterrent and would lead to less driving safety. The reform would have required all employers to use state driver's licenses or a database from the U.S. Department of Homeland Security to check the legal status of workers. Ford co-sponsored a bill with Glenn McConnell that would limit the governor's authority to appoint and remove board members overseeing the Charleston port and increase required qualifications for board members. Ford opposed a bill giving Sanford authority over the South Carolina Department of Health and Environmental Control.

== 2010 Gubernatorial candidacy ==
Ford ran to succeed Mark Sanford as Governor of South Carolina in the 2010 gubernatorial election. His platform included reinstating video poker to the state to generate returns from taxes on the gaming industry in an effort to balance the state budget, something he has proposed since the late 1990s. A law Ford sponsored in 2008 to make gambling legal failed to advance; he planned a voter referendum to repeal the ban. Ford faced state senator Vincent A. Sheheen of Camden and State Superintendent of Education Jim Rex in a primary election. Sheheen's campaign has raised $33,000 as of January 2009, while Ford's campaign raised $6,000. On June 8, 2010, Ford finished in third place in the primary election with 18 percent of the vote.

== Electoral history ==
South Carolina State Senator, 42nd Senatorial District, 1992

Primary election, August 25, 1992

Threshold > 50%

Candidate	Affiliation	Support	Outcome
Robert Ford	Democratic	3,417 (62.47%)	Elected
Margaret Rush	Democratic	2,053 (37.53%)	Defeated

Ford won the general election unopposed on November 3, 1992.

South Carolina State Senator, 42nd Senatorial District, 1996

Ford did not have a primary opponent on June 11, 1996.

General election, November 5, 1996

Candidate	Affiliation	Support	Outcome
Robert Ford	Democratic	11,315 (64.87%)	Elected
Tim Scott	Republican	6,110 (35.03%)	Defeated

South Carolina State Senator, 42nd Senatorial District, 2000

Primary election

Threshold > 50%

First Ballot, June 13, 2000

Candidate	Affiliation	Support	Outcome
Robert Ford	Democratic	2,112 (48.64%)	Run-off
Maurice Washington	Democratic	1,191 (27.43%)	Run-off
Reuben R. Reeder	Democratic	1,039 (23.93%)	Defeated

Second Ballot, June 27, 2000

Candidate	Affiliation	Support	Outcome
Robert Ford	Democratic	2,397 (60.35%)	Elected
Maurice Washington	Democratic	1,575 (39.65%)	Defeated

Ford won the general election unopposed on November 7, 2000.

South Carolina State Senator, 42nd Senatorial District, 2004

Primary election, June 8, 2004

Threshold > 50%

Candidate	Affiliation	Support	Outcome
Robert Ford	Democratic	2,684 (89.35%)	Elected
Brian K. Maxwell	Democratic	320 (10.65%)	Defeated

General election, November 2, 2004

Candidate	Affiliation	Support	Outcome
Robert Ford	Democratic	14,677 (69.03%)	Elected
Maurice Washington	Petition	6.580 (30.95%)	Defeated

South Carolina State Senator, 42nd Senatorial District, 2008

Primary election, June 10, 2008

Threshold > 50%

Candidate	Affiliation	Support	Outcome
Robert Ford	Democratic	3,793 (74.72%)	Elected
Dwayne M. Green	Democratic	1,283 (25.28%)	Defeated

General election, November 4, 2008

Candidate	Affiliation	Support	Outcome
Robert Ford	Democratic	22,660 (81.82%)	Elected
Scotty Sheriff	Republican	5,014 (18.11%)	Defeated

South Carolina State Senator, 42nd Senatorial District, 2012

Senator Ford was unopposed for reelection in both the Democratic primary and the general election.

General election, November 6, 2012

Candidate	Affiliation	Support	Outcome
Robert Ford	Democratic	30,064 (98.82%)	Elected
Various	Write-in	360 (1.18%)	
