= Arrants =

Arrants is a surname. Notable people with the surname include:

- J. Clator Arrants (died 1989), American politician
- Rod Arrants (1944–2021), American actor
