= New Prospect Elementary School =

New Prospect Elementary School may refer to:

- New Prospect Elementary School, Alpharetta, Georgia - Fulton County School System
- New Prospect Elementary School, Anderson, South Carolina - Anderson School District Five
- New Prospect Elementary School, Inman, South Carolina - Spartanburg County School District 1
