= Robert Sheheen =

American politician

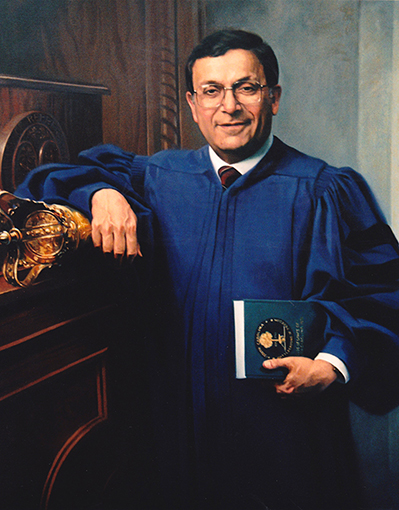

57th Speaker of the South Carolina House of Representatives
- In office October 1, 1986 – December 6, 1994
- Preceded by: Ramon Schwartz, Jr.
- Succeeded by: David Wilkins

Member of the South Carolina House of Representatives from the 52nd district
- In office December 1976 – November 28, 2000
- Preceded by: J. Clator Arrants
- Succeeded by: Vincent Sheheen

Personal details
- Born: Robert Joseph Sheheen; January 21, 1943 (age 83) Camden, South Carolina
- Party: Democratic
- Education: Duke University; University of South Carolina

Robert Joseph Sheheen (born January 21, 1943) is an American lawyer and politician. A Democrat, Sheheen served as Speaker of the South Carolina House of Representatives from 1986 to 1994. Sheheen was the first Lebanese-American to serve in the position.

== Early life and education ==
Sheheen was born in Camden, South Carolina. He received a bachelor's degree from Duke University in 1965 and a law degree from the University of South Carolina in 1968. Sheheen later received honorary degrees from The Citadel and Winthrop University.

== Political career ==
Sheheen was a member of the South Carolina House of Representatives from 1977 to 2000; he served as speaker from 1986 to 1994. Sheheen was Speaker of the House during the Operation Lost Trust scandal. He left the speakership in 1994 and was succeeded in the House of Representatives by his nephew, Vincent, in 2000.
