= WABB (disambiguation) =

WABB is a radio station (1390 AM) licensed to Belton, South Carolina, United States.

WABB may also refer to:

- WABF (AM), a radio station (1480 AM) licensed to Mobile, Alabama, United States, which held the call sign WABB from 1948 to 2012
- WABD, a radio station (97.5 FM) licensed to Mobile, Alabama, United States, which held the call sign WABB-FM from 1973 to 2012
- WABB was originally a radio station established in Harrisburg, Pennsylvania in 1923.
- Frans Kaisiepo International Airport (ICAO: WABB), Biak, Papua, Indonesia
