= North Pointe Elementary School =

North Pointe Elementary School may refer to:

- North Pointe Elementary School - Clear Creek Independent School District - Houston
- North Pointe Elementary School - Boone County Schools - Hebron, Kentucky
- North Pointe Elementary School - Anderson School District Five - Anderson, South Carolina
