= WANS =

Coordinates: 34°32′17″N 82°41′28″W

- Anderson, South Carolina; United States
- Broadcast area: Upstate South Carolina
- Frequency: 1280 kHz
- Branding: God's Country

Programming
- Format: Southern gospel

Ownership
- Owner: Power Foundation
- Sister stations: WRIX; WHQA

History
- First air date: June 1, 1949
- Last air date: March 15, 2022
- Call sign meaning: Anderson (city of license)

Technical information
- Licensing authority: FCC
- Facility ID: 21829
- Class: B
- Power: 5,000 watts (day); 1,000 watts (night)

Links
- Public license information: Public file; LMS
- Webcast: Listen live

WANS (1280 AM) was a southern gospel radio station located in Anderson, South Carolina, United States. The station was licensed by the FCC to broadcast with 5 kW nondirectional during the daytime and 1 kW directional at night.

== Station history ==
WANS 1280 AM had been in existence since June 1, 1949. For many years, it was a Top 40/CHR station. In the 1960s, the call sign stood for "We're Anderson's Now Sound". Later..."We're Anderson's New Sound".

WANS paired up with 100,000-watt WANS-FM 107.3 (now WJMZ-FM) in the 1960s. The stations had separate feeds and broadcast from studios located on Clemson Blvd. in Anderson. The two stations were wildly popular for many years. A large WANS-AM/FM sign was erected in front of the studios on Clemson Blvd. and advertised local Anderson stores and community events. In 1988, new studios were built beside the existing ones. After new ownership took over in 1990, declining ratings and loss of key staff caused a steep decline in ratings for both the AM and FM stations. In 1992, the stations went bankrupt. WANS-FM moved to Greenville, South Carolina. The WANS studios on Clemson Blvd. were sold. From 1992 to late 1993, WANS operated from the transmitter site nearby. The station began simulcasting WFBC (1330 AM)'s news–talk feed out of Greenville, South Carolina.

In late 1993, WRIX-AM-FM owner Matt Phillips purchased WANS and moved all operations back to Anderson. WANS-FM changed its call sign to WJMZ-FM. WANS aired The Matt and Bev Show from WRIX. WANS then played a mix of oldies music and standards for several years with live and local DJs such as Jerry Peeler's beach show and Jimmy Gilstrap's classic 1960s and 1970s rock-n-roll, which was live every Saturday. In early 2000, the station became all Carolina beach oldies headed by longtime WANS DJ and manager Dann Scott. In 2005, the station went all sports talk from ESPN Radio. Over the years, it would also play other talk programming. In 2013, it went to all sports talk again from Fox Sports Radio. In November 2014, WANS flipped to a classic hits format and was simulcast with WRIX-FM 103.1. Owner Tom Ervin donated WRIX-AM-FM and WANS to the Power Foundation out of Greenville, South Carolina, which operates southern gospel radio stations in other markets. In late February 2015, WANS was flipped to 1950s-1970s oldies. It was then paired with an FM translator 107.7 FM. This put WANS back on FM for the first time since 1992. On March 1, 2015, the simulcast with WHQA (formerly WRIX-FM) 103.1 ended. WHQA flipped to a southern gospel format, and WANS 1280 and 107.7 FM flipped to classic hits.

WANS was the sister station to WRIX and WHQA. In September 2008, the format was shifted from ESPN sports/talk to news/talk, the former format and lineup of sister station WRIX-FM 103.1, which shifted to adult contemporary on the same day. WANS broadcast the ESPN Radio network late at night and on weekends.

WANS carried all Anderson Joes baseball games live until the league went under. They had broadcast many different sports from Anderson University and football games from Coastal Carolina University. They also aired all of the Westside High School Ram football games.

On January 25, 2013, WANS changed its format from news/talk to sports, with programming from Fox Sports Radio. Tom Ervin purchased WANS in 2013.

WANS celebrated 65 years on the air on June 1, 2014, with a radio special hosted by upstate radio veteran "Jazzy" Jeff Bright, host of The Greatest Hits on sister station WRIX-FM 103.1.

On November 29, 2014, WANS changed its format from sports to classic hits, simulcasting WRIX-FM 103.1. The flip to 1950s-1970s oldies and end of having the same feed as WHQA (formerly WRIX-FM) began on March 1, 2015. WANS had been back on FM with a translator on 107.7 MHz FM; WANS was on FM for the first time since 1992.

On December 1, 2016, WANS changed its format to southern gospel, branded as "God's Country".

The Federal Communications Commission cancelled the station’s license on February 9, 2024, as WANS had been silent since at least March 15, 2022.
