= WHPB =

WHPB refers to the following broadcasting stations in the United States:

- WHPB-LP, a low-power radio station (98.5 FM) licensed to Orlando, Florida
- WABB (AM), a radio station (1390 AM) licensed to Belton, South Carolina, which held the call sign WHPB from 1956 to 2004
