= Preston Jones =

Preston Jones may refer to:

- Preston Jones (playwright) (1936–1979), American playwright
- Preston Jones (gridiron football) (born 1970), American football player
- Preston Jones (actor) (born 1983), American actor
