= 2010 South Carolina gubernatorial election =

- November 2, 2010
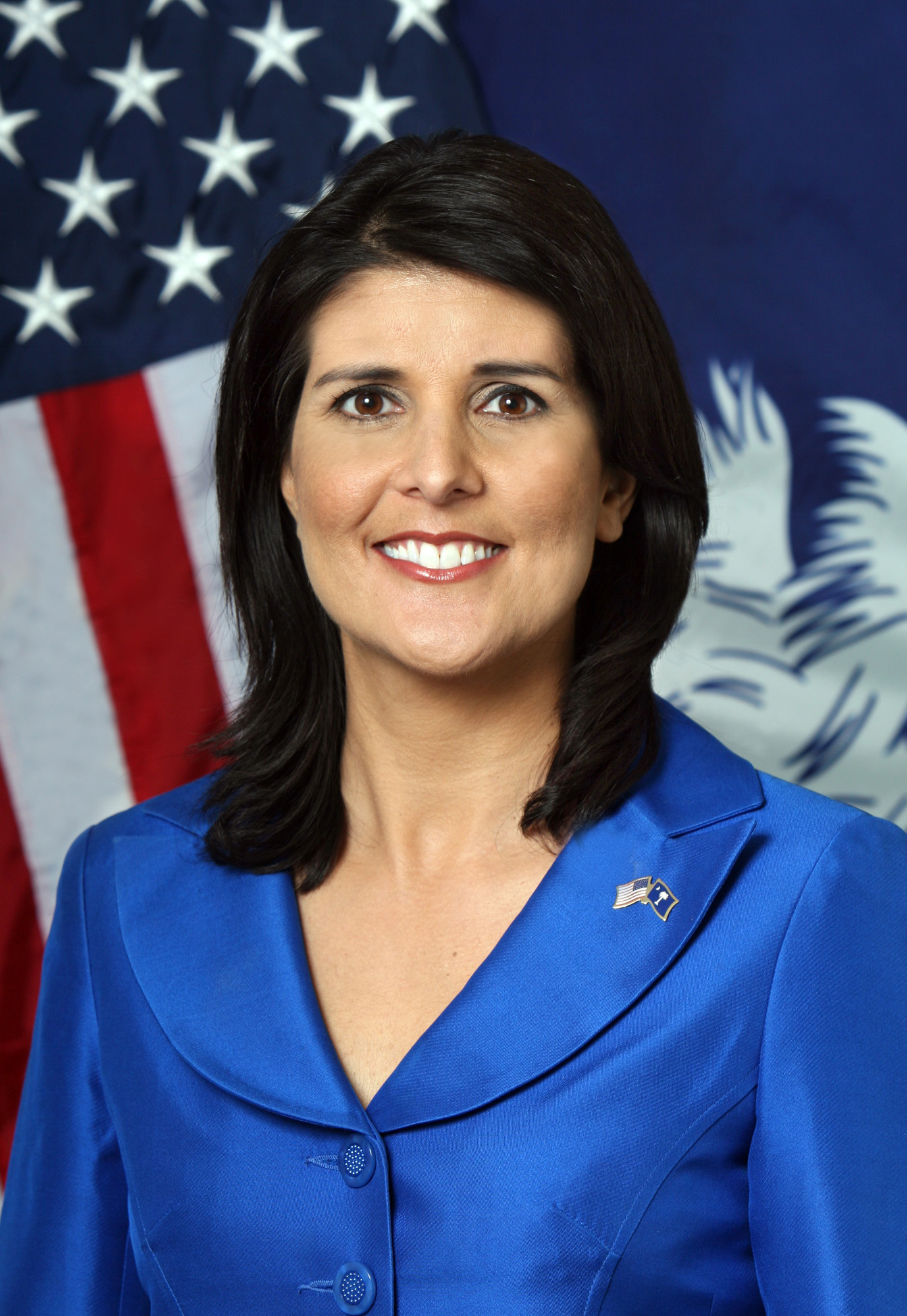

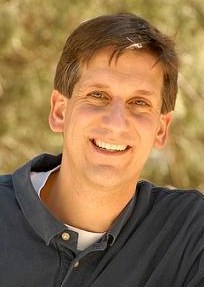
Nominee	Nikki Haley	Vincent Sheheen
Party	Republican	Democratic
Popular vote	690,525	630,535
Percentage	51.37%	46.91%
- Haley: 40–50% 50–60% 60–70% 70–80% 80–90% >90% Sheheen: 40–50% 50–60% 60–70% 70–80% 80–90% >90%
Governor before election
Mark Sanford
Republican
Elected Governor
Nikki Haley
Republican

The 2010 South Carolina gubernatorial election took place on November 2, 2010. Incumbent Republican Governor Mark Sanford was term-limited and unable to seek re-election. Primary elections took place on June 8, 2010, and a runoff election, as was necessary on the Republican side, was held two weeks later on June 22.

Republican Nikki Haley defeated Democrat Vincent Sheheen in the general election by a margin of 4.5%. This was the closest that the Democrats had come to winning the governorship of South Carolina since their victory in 1998, until the 2026 gubernatorial election. This is the first open-seat election since 1994. Haley was re-elected in 2014 in a rematch with Sheheen.

== Republican primary ==
According to CNN, Haley initially entered the gubernatorial primary as a dark horse candidate. In an article covering her surge in the primary in the weeks prior to the election, it was noted that a "surprise" endorsement from former Alaska governor and 2008 vice presidential candidate Sarah Palin boosted Haley's candidacy. Haley's campaign was backed by TV ads run by ReformSC, an advocacy group funded by allies of outgoing Governor Mark Sanford.

=== Candidates ===
- Gresham Barrett, U.S. representative
- André Bauer, lieutenant governor
- Nikki Haley, state representative
- Henry McMaster, state attorney general

=== Endorsements ===
==== Nikki Haley ====
- Former Governor Sarah Palin (R-AK), former Republican vice presidential candidate
- Former Governor Mitt Romney (R-MA), former presidential candidate for 2008 Republican nomination
- Former First Lady of South Carolina Jenny Sanford
- Republican Liberty Caucus

==== Gresham Barrett ====
- Former U.S. Vice President Dick Cheney

==== Henry McMaster ====
- Former Governor David Beasley (R-SC)
- Former Mayor of New York Rudy Giuliani (R-NY), former presidential candidate for 2008 Republican nomination
- Senator John McCain (R-AZ), former candidate for 2008 presidential election

==== André Bauer ====
- Former Governor Mike Huckabee (R-AR), former presidential candidate for 2008 Republican nomination

=== Polling ===
Poll source	Date(s) administered	Sample size	Margin of error	Henry McMaster	Gresham Barrett	André Bauer	Nikki Haley	Other	Undecided
Public Policy Polling (report)	June 5–6, 2010	998	± 3.1%	16%	23%	12%	43%	--	7%
Public Policy Polling (report)	May 22–23, 2010	638	± 3.9%	18%	16%	13%	39%	--	14%
Rasmussen Reports (report)	May 17, 2010	931	± 4.5%	19%	17%	12%	30%	3%	13%
Rasmussen Reports (report)	March 3, 2010	500	± 4.5%	21%	14%	17%	12%	9%	29%
InsiderAdvantage/Majority Opinion Research ()	December 16, 2009	371	± 5.1%	22%	9%	22%	13%	6%	28%

=== Runoff ===
Poll source	Date(s) administered	Sample size	Margin of error	Nikki Haley	Gresham Barrett	Undecided
Public Policy Polling (report)	June 5–6, 2010	998	± 3.1%	51%	35%	14%

=== Results ===
Primary results by county: Haley: Haley—60–70%; Haley—50–60%; Haley—40–50%; Haley—<40%; Barrett: Barrett—40–50%; Barrett—50–60%

Republican primary results
Party	Candidate	Votes	%
Republican	Nikki Haley	206,326	48.9
Republican	Gresham Barrett	91,824	21.8
Republican	Henry McMaster	71,494	16.9
Republican	André Bauer	52,607	12.4
Total votes		422,251	100

Primary runoff results by county: Haley: Haley—80–90%; Haley—70–80%; Haley—60–70%; Haley—50–60%; Barrett: Barrett—50–60%; Barrett—60–70%

Republican primary runoff results on June 22
Party	Candidate	Votes	%
Republican	Nikki Haley	233,733	65.1
Republican	Gresham Barrett	125,601	34.9
Total votes		359,334	100

== Democratic primary ==
=== Candidates ===
- Robert Ford, state senator from Charleston
- Jim Rex, state superintendent of education from Fairfield County
- Vincent Sheheen, state senator from Camden

=== Polling ===
Poll source	Date(s) administered	Sample size	Margin of error	Jim Rex	Vincent Sheheen	Robert Ford	Dwight Drake*	Other	Undecided
Public Policy Polling (report)	May 22–23, 2010	410	± 4.8%	30%	36%	11%	--	--	23%
Rasmussen Reports (report)	May 17, 2010	404	± 5.0%	22%	30%	4%	--	12%	32%
Rasmussen Reports (report)	March 3, 2010	500	± 4.5%	16%	16%	12%	5%	15%	37%

- As of March 5, 2010 Dwight Drake withdrew from the race for governor.

=== Results ===
Primary results by county: Sheheen: Sheheen—>90%; Sheheen—80–90%; Sheheen—70–80%; Sheheen—60–70%; Sheheen—50–60%; Sheheen—40–50%; Sheheen—<40%

Democratic primary results
Party	Candidate	Votes	%
Democratic	Vincent Sheheen	111,637	59.0
Democratic	Jim Rex	43,590	23.0
Democratic	Robert Ford	34,121	18.0
Total votes		189,348	100

== Other parties ==
- Morgan Reeves, businessman, minister, and retired National Football League player from Irmo
  - Reeves was nominated on March 30 by the United Citizens Party and South Carolina Green Party on April 7 (see SC Election Commission website). He appeared on the November 2 general election ballot for both parties. An Independent, Reeves collected enough voter petition signatures to qualify by the July 15 deadline onto a third ballot line.
- Jim Rex, state superintendent of education from Fairfield County
  - Rex was nominated by the Working Families Party prior to losing the Democratic primary. He did not appear on the Working Families ballot line in November due to South Carolina's "sore loser" law that requires candidates not to seek nominations from multiple parties from appearing on the ballot after they lose any one party's nomination (see candidate party pledge forms). Several election law issues are before US appellate court in Richmond, Virginia regarding conformity to the 1965 Voting Rights Act and US Constitutional provisions.

== General election ==
=== Debates ===
- "First in the State" Republican gubernatorial primary debate

Sponsored by the Republican parties of Newberry and Laurens counties
Aired on WIS-TV on September 22, 2009
Watch here

- "Spotlight on the Candidates" joint gubernatorial primary debate

Sponsored by the SC Natural Resources Society
Aired on SCETV on November 3, 2009
(This debate marked the first time in state history that gubernatorial primary candidates from both parties participated in the same debate.)
Watch here

- SCGOP gubernatorial debate

Sponsored by the South Carolina Republican Party
Moderated by MSNBC hosts Joe Scarborough and Mika Brzezinski
Aired on WCSC-TV on January 28, 2010
Watch here

- Republican Candidates For South Carolina Governor April Debate: Watch here

=== Endorsements ===
Senator Vincent Sheheen - South Carolina Chamber of Commerce

Representative Nikki Haley - National Rifle Association of America

Representative Nikki Haley - South Citizens for Life

=== Predictions ===
Source	Ranking	As of
Cook Political Report	Lean R	October 14, 2010
Rothenberg	Safe R	October 28, 2010
RealClearPolitics	Lean R	November 1, 2010
Sabato's Crystal Ball	Likely R	October 28, 2010
CQ Politics	Lean R	October 28, 2010

=== Polling ===
Poll source	Dates administered	Nikki Haley (R)	Vincent Sheheen (D)
Crantford & Associates	October 21, 2010	48%	37%
Crantford & Associates	October 18, 2010	43%	41%
Winthrop University	October 13, 2010	47%	39%
Hamilton Campaigns	October 5, 2010	49%	44%
Hamilton Campaigns	October 5, 2010	49%	44%
Hamilton Campaigns	October 4, 2010	51%	41%
Crantford & Associates	October 2, 2010	45%	41%
Rasmussen Reports	September 22, 2010	50%	33%
Rasmussen Reports	August 25, 2010	52%	36%
Rasmussen Reports	July 29, 2010	49%	35%
Rasmussen Reports	June 23, 2010	52%	40%
Rasmussen Reports	June 10, 2010	55%	34%
Public Policy Polling	May 22–23, 2010	44%	34%

=== Results ===
South Carolina gubernatorial election, 2010
Party	Candidate	Votes	%	±%
Republican	Nikki Haley	690,525	51.37%	−3.75%
Democratic	Vincent Sheheen	630,534	46.91%	+2.12%
United Citizens	Morgan B. Reeves	20,114	1.50%	N/A
Write-ins		3,025	0.23%	N/A
Majority		59,991	4.46%	−5.87%
Turnout		1,344,198	50.92%	+6.42%
Republican hold		Swing		

==== Counties that flipped from Republican to Democratic ====
- Colleton (largest city: Walterboro)
- Kershaw (largest city: Camden)
- Florence (largest city: Florence)
- Charleston (largest city: Charleston)
- Darlington (largest city: Hartsville)

==== Counties that flipped from Democratic to Republican ====
- Newberry (largest city: Newberry)
- Saluda (largest city: Saluda)
- Edgefield (largest city: Edgefield)
- McCormick (largest town: McCormick)
