= South Carolina Heritage Act =

South Carolina State Legislature
- Assembly voted: May 18, 2000
- Signed into law: May 23, 2000
- Sponsor(s): Robert Ford
- Governor: Jim Hodges
- Code: S.C. Code Ann. Sec. 10-1-165
- Website: https://law.justia.com/codes/south-carolina/2012/title-10/chapter-1/section-10-1-165

Status: Current legislation

The South Carolina Heritage Act is a South Carolina statute that forbids the removal or alteration of historic monuments located on public property in South Carolina as well as the rededication of any public areas or structures named after a historic person or event. The historic monuments protected include war monuments (such as monuments to the American Civil War and both World Wars) as well as monuments representing Native American and African American history.

When the Act was enacted in 2000, it was seen as a compromise by state legislators who were seeking to remove the Confederate flag from the South Carolina State House and those who wished for it to remain. Nonetheless, the Act has been controversial within the state. It has prevented municipalities from removing memorials to controversial figures and public universities from changing the names of school buildings in the wake of the George Floyd protests.

A lawsuit challenging the constitutionality of the Heritage Act went before the South Carolina Supreme Court on May 25, 2021. On September 23, the court upheld the majority of the act as constitutional but struck down its two-thirds legislative majority requirement. The court held that the two-thirds requirement restricted the General Assembly's legislative power.

== Statutory language ==
(A) No Revolutionary War, War of 1812, Mexican War, War Between the States, Spanish-American War, World War I, World War II, Korean War, Vietnam War, Persian Gulf War, Native American, or African-American History monuments or memorials erected on public property of the State or any of its political subdivisions may be relocated, removed, disturbed, or altered. No street, bridge, structure, park, preserve, reserve, or other public area of the State or any of its political subdivisions dedicated in memory of or named for any historic figure or historic event may be renamed or rededicated. No person may prevent the public body responsible for the monument or memorial from taking proper measures and exercising proper means for the protection, preservation, and care of these monuments, memorials, or nameplates.

(B) The provisions of this section may only be amended or repealed upon passage of an act which has received a two-thirds vote on the third reading of the bill in each branch of the General Assembly.

== Enactment ==
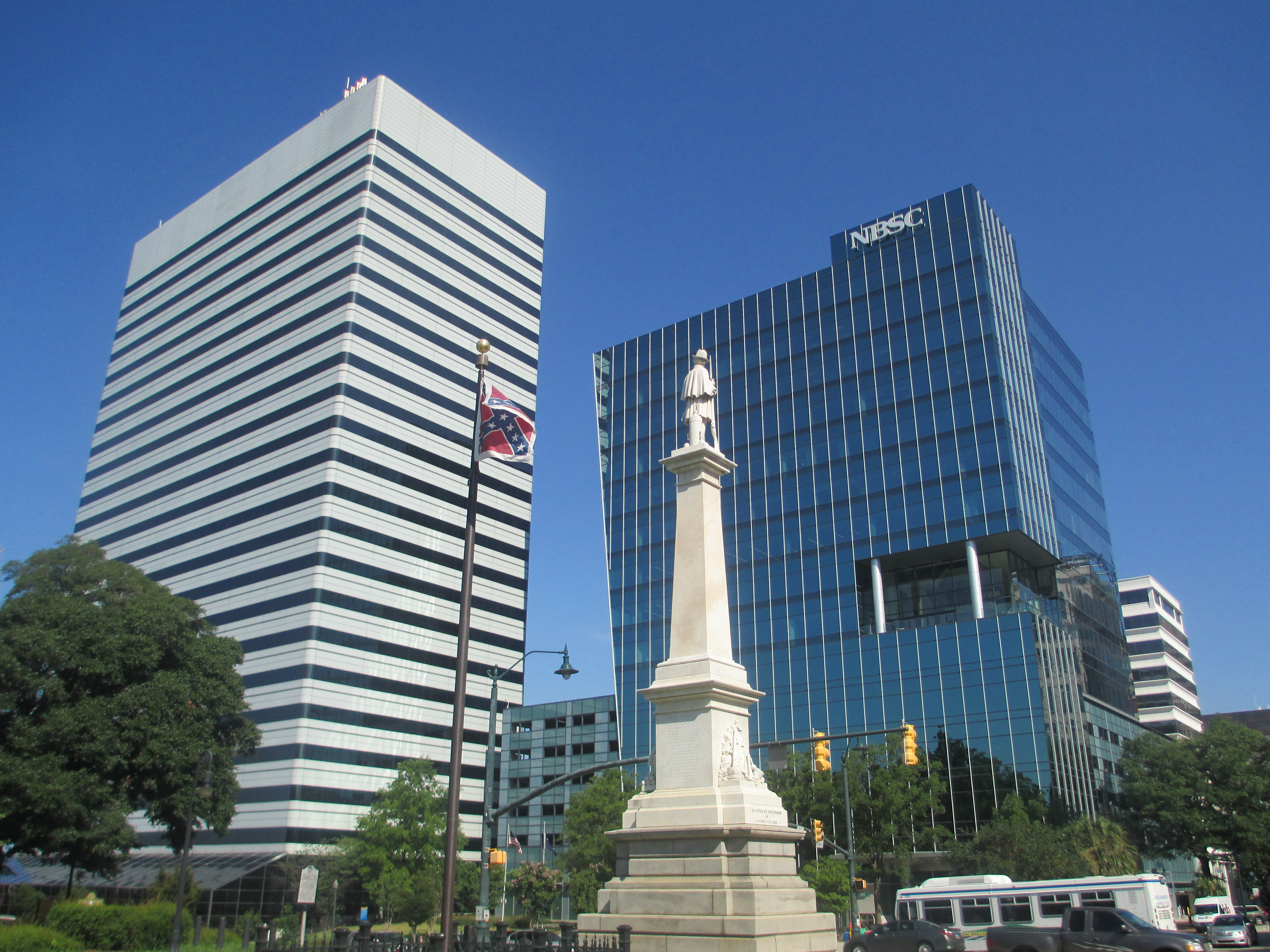
The Confederate flag was moved to the Confederate Memorial on the statehouse grounds as a compromise which included the Heritage Act.

The Heritage Act was signed into law on May 23, 2000, by Governor Jim Hodges. Although the law requires approval from two-thirds of both houses to amend or repeal the law, the law itself was passed with less than that threshold. In a nonbinding opinion in 2020, Attorney General Alan Wilson's office stated that the requirement was unlawful.

The act was seen as a compromise by state legislators who were seeking to remove the Confederate flag from the South Carolina State House and legislators who wanted it to remain. The placement of the flag on top of the State House had become a topic of interest during the 2000 Republican Party presidential primaries. The flag was removed on July 2, 2000, from the State House and moved to a nearby Confederate Soldiers monument. The flag was removed from the statehouse grounds altogether in 2015 following the Charleston church shooting.

Since its enactment, the Heritage Act has been controversial. In 2018, plaintiffs who sought to change a memorial in Greenwood County, South Carolina, dedicated to soldiers of both World Wars which categorized soldiers by race successfully argued that the memorial did not fall under the Act. The court stated that the memorial could be changed to list soldiers' names alphabetically because it was owned by a private entity and not the government. The court declined to adjudicate the constitutionality of the Act itself.

== Use of the Act after the George Floyd protests ==
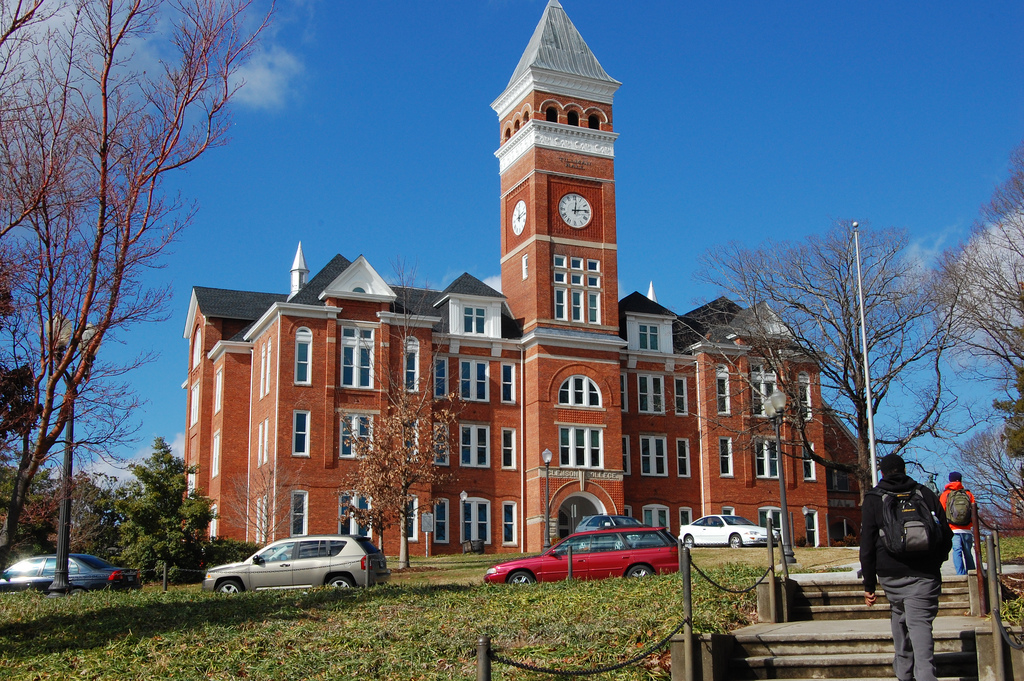
The Heritage Act has prevented Clemson University from renaming Tillman Hall.

The Heritage Act became particularly polarizing following the George Floyd protests in 2020. That year, activists across the country made calls to remove public memorials of historical figures arguing that the monuments were "a constant reminder of the dehumanization of African-Americans and the pushback against [their] civil and human rights." Since then, movements to rename structures or remove monuments within South Carolina have had varying degrees of success in South Carolina:

- In June 2020, Clemson University's Board of Trustee passed a resolution asking the General Assembly to amend the Heritage Act so that the University could rename Tillman Hall, a campus building named after Ben Tillman. Tillman was a seminal figure in the state's history who was instrumental in the creation of Clemson University. However, he was also a white supremacist who the Board considered divisive. On June 12, 2020, the University removed John C. Calhoun's name from its Honors College.
- The University of South Carolina has requested permission from the state legislature to rename the J. Marion Sims residence hall. The University reviewed whether it would rename multiple buildings on campus, including the Strom Thurmond Fitness Center. Any name change would require the Heritage Act to be amended. The University ultimately decided that they would not push to rename the controversial buildings due to the Heritage Act.
- In June 2020, Alan Wilson's office stated in a nonbinding opinion that the Heritage Act did not apply to Charleston's controversial removal of the John C. Calhoun Monument in Marion Square. The opinion stated that Calhoun did not fall under the provisions of the Act and that the monument itself was located on private property.
- Alan Wilson's office determined that the Meriwether Monument in North Augusta did not fall under the Heritage Act. The monument honored the lone white man killed during the Hamburg massacre but not the six Black men who were murdered by that man's militia. Nonetheless, the General Assembly must approve the monument's removal as the General Assembly erected it in the first place.

== South Carolina Supreme Court case ==
In July 2020, Jennifer Pinckney (the widow of Clementa C. Pinckney), Columbia City Councilmember Howard Duvall, and former state Senator Kay Patterson filed a lawsuit with the South Carolina Supreme Court challenging the constitutionality of the Heritage Act. The parties allege that the Act's two-thirds threshold is unconstitutional and that the law violates Home rule. The SC Supreme Court, which had original jurisdiction, heard arguments on May 25, 2021. The court focused on four issues: (1) whether the claim was ripe; (2) whether the two-thirds threshold was constitutional; (3) whether the threshold was severable from the other parts of the law; and (4) whether the list of applicable monuments was unduly specific.

On September 23, the court upheld the majority of the act as constitutional but struck down the two-thirds legislative majority requirement due to its restriction on the General Assembly's legislative power.
