= WRIX =

Coordinates: 34°28′14″N 82°38′03″W

- Homeland Park, South Carolina; United States
- Broadcast area: Upstate South Carolina
- Frequency: 1020 kHz
- Branding: Life Talk

Programming
- Format: Christian radio

Ownership
- Owner: The Power Foundation; (Charles McClure)
- Sister stations: WABB, WHQA

History
- First air date: September 1, 1986

Technical information
- Licensing authority: FCC
- Facility ID: 1216
- Class: D
- Power: 10,000 watts day
- Translator: 104.7 W284CZ (Anderson)

Links
- Public license information: Public file; LMS
- Webcast: Listen Live
- Website: lifetalkusa.com

WRIX (1020 AM, "Life Talk") is a daytime-only Christian radio station located near Anderson, South Carolina. The station is licensed by the Federal Communications Commission (FCC) to the nearby community of Homeland Park and broadcasts with a power of 10,000 watts during the day.

== History ==
WRIX signed on the air September 1, 1986, as the AM sister to WRIX-FM 103.1 (now WHQA). WRIX & WRIX-FM were founded by the late Matt Phillips. Tom Ervin purchased WRIX in 2013. The Matt & Bev Show was a popular morning show which aired weekdays from 8AM. to 11AM. Local musicians Bob Eidson, Jimmy Gilstrap and blues artist Kip Anderson also had shows on Wrix & Wans. Several other talk shows such as George Duckworth and morning favorite show host Michael Branch "Pork Chop" would soon follow.
