= Zacch Pickens =

American football player (born 2000)

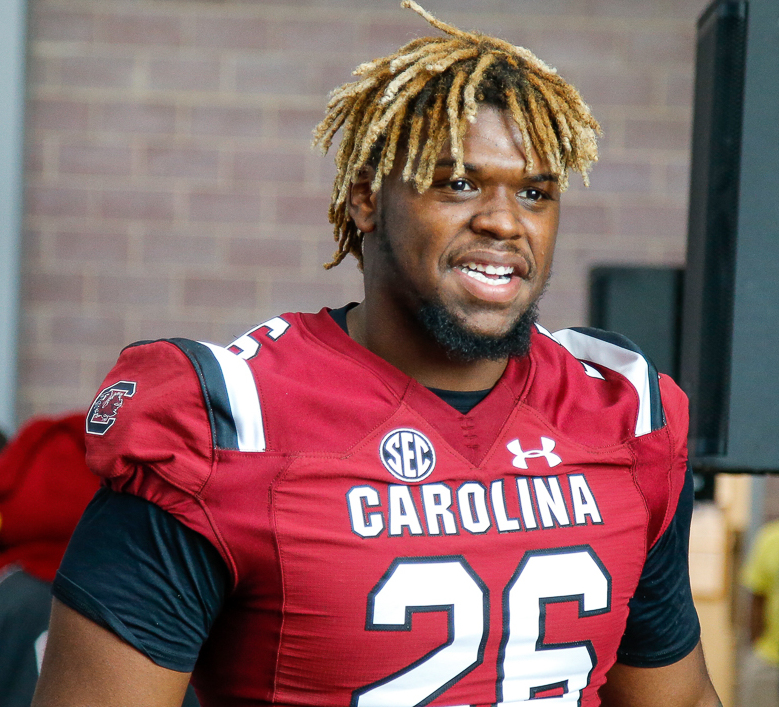
- Pickens with the South Carolina Gamecocks in 2019

No. 93 – Atlanta Falcons
- Position: Defensive tackle
- Roster status: Practice squad

Personal information
- Born: March 6, 2000 (age 26); Anderson, South Carolina, U.S.
- Listed height: 6 ft 4 in (1.93 m)
- Listed weight: 300 lb (136 kg)

Career information
- High school: T. L. Hanna (Anderson)
- College: South Carolina (2019–2022)
- NFL draft: 2023: 3rd round, 64th overall pick

Career history
- Chicago Bears (2023–2024); Kansas City Chiefs (2025); New York Giants (2026)*; Atlanta Falcons (2026–present)*
- * Offseason or practice squad member only

Career NFL statistics as of 2025
- Total tackles: 44
- Sacks: 1.5
- Forced fumbles: 1
- Pass deflections: 1
- Stats at Pro Football Reference

Zaccheaus L. Pickens (born March 6, 2000) is an American professional football defensive tackle for the Atlanta Falcons of the National Football League (NFL). He played college football for the South Carolina Gamecocks. Pickens has also played for the Chicago Bears and Kansas City Chiefs.

== Early life ==
Pickens was born on March 6, 2000, in Anderson, South Carolina. He attended T. L. Hanna High School, where he was named South Carolina's Gatorade Football Player of the Year as a senior in 2018 after recording 87 tackles, six sacks, and an interception which he returned for a touchdown. A five-star recruit, Pickens was selected to play in the 2019 Under Armour All-American Game. He committed to the University of South Carolina to play college football.

== College career ==
As a true freshman at South Carolina in 2019, Pickens played in all 12 games and had 16 tackles. As a sophomore in 2020, he started seven of 10 games, recording 35 tackles and one sack. As a junior in 2021, he started all 13 games, finishing with 38 tackles and four sacks. Pickens returned to South Carolina for his senior season in 2022.

== Professional career ==
Pre-draft measurables
Height	Weight	Arm length	Hand span	Wingspan	40-yard dash	10-yard split	20-yard split	20-yard shuttle	Three-cone drill	Vertical jump	Broad jump	Bench press
6 ft 3 7/8 in (1.93 m)	291 lb (132 kg)	34 3/8 in (0.87 m)	10 3/8 in (0.26 m)	6 ft 9 5/8 in (2.07 m)	4.89 s	1.74 s	2.83 s	4.62 s	7.45 s	30.5 in (0.77 m)	9 ft 8 in (2.95 m)	22 reps
All values from NFL Combine

=== Chicago Bears ===
Pickens was selected by the Chicago Bears in the third round (64th overall) in the 2023 NFL draft.

On August 26, 2025, Pickens was waived by the Bears as part of final roster cuts.

=== Kansas City Chiefs ===
On August 29, 2025, Pickens was signed to the Kansas City Chiefs practice squad. He was promoted to the active roster on December 17.

On May 4, 2026, Pickens was waived by the Chiefs.

=== New York Giants ===
On May 5, 2026, Pickens was claimed off of waivers by the New York Giants. On August 30, Pickens was waived by the Giants as a part of final roster cuts.

=== Atlanta Falcons ===
On September 9, 2026, Pickens signed with the Atlanta Falcons' practice squad.
