= 2014 South Carolina gubernatorial election =

- November 4, 2014
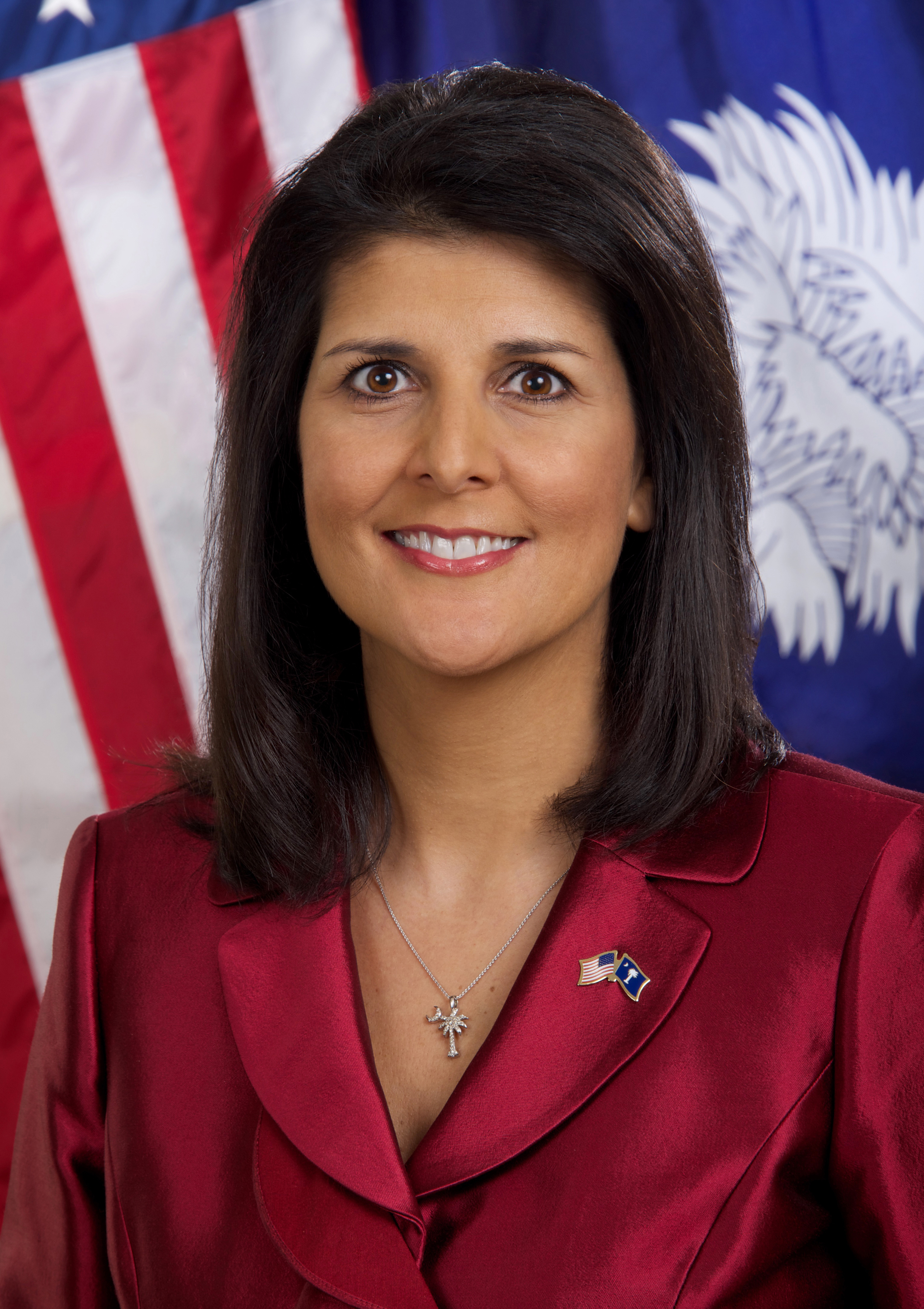

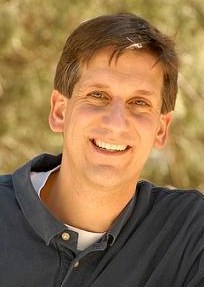
Nominee	Nikki Haley	Vincent Sheheen
Party	Republican	Democratic
Popular vote	696,645	516,166
Percentage	55.90%	41.42%
- Haley: 40–50% 50–60% 60–70% 70–80% Sheheen: 40–50% 50–60% 60–70% 70–80%
Governor before election
Nikki Haley
Republican
Elected Governor
Nikki Haley
Republican

The 2014 South Carolina gubernatorial election took place on November 4, 2014, to elect the governor of South Carolina, concurrently with the regularly-scheduled election and special election to both of South Carolina's U.S. Senate seats, as well as other elections to the United States Senate in other states and elections to the United States House of Representatives and various state and local elections.

Incumbent Republican Governor Nikki Haley ran for a second term in office. She faced Democratic State Senator Vincent Sheheen in the general election. Republican-turned-independent Tom Ervin had been running, but he withdrew from the race and endorsed Sheheen.

Haley defeated Sheheen for the second time, winning with nearly 56 percent of the vote.

== Republican primary ==
=== Candidates ===
==== Declared ====
- Nikki Haley, incumbent governor

==== Withdrew ====
- Tom Ervin, attorney, former state representative and former circuit court judge (ran as an independent and later dropped out of the race to endorse Vincent Sheheen)

==== Declined ====
- Tom Davis, state senator
- Bobby Harrell, Speaker of the South Carolina House of Representatives
- Curtis M. Loftis, Jr., state treasurer
- Glenn F. McConnell, Lieutenant Governor
- Mick Mulvaney, U.S. representative
- William Walter Wilkins, former Chief Judge of the United States Court of Appeals for the Fourth Circuit
- Alan Wilson, Attorney General of South Carolina

=== Polling ===
Poll source	Date(s) administered	Sample size	Margin of error	Nikki Haley	Someone else	Undecided
Public Policy Polling	December 7–9, 2012	506	± 4.4%	53%	37%	10%

Hypothetical polling

Poll source	Date(s) administered	Sample size	Margin of error	Nikki Haley	Curtis Loftis	Undecided
Public Policy Polling	December 7–9, 2012	506	± 4.4%	66%	18%	17%

Poll source	Date(s) administered	Sample size	Margin of error	Nikki Haley	Glenn McConnell	Undecided
Public Policy Polling	December 7–9, 2012	506	± 4.4%	58%	26%	17%

== Democratic primary ==
=== Candidates ===
==== Declared ====
- Vincent Sheheen, state senator and nominee for governor in 2010

==== Declined ====
- Stephen K. Benjamin, Mayor of Columbia
- Harry L. Ott, Jr., Minority Leader of the South Carolina House of Representatives

=== Endorsements ===
Vincent Sheheen

Elected Officials

- Welborn Adams, Mayor of Greenwood
- Lovith Anderson, Mayor of Lake City
- John Douglas, Mayor of Chesterfield
- Doug Echols, Mayor of Rock Hill
- Tom Ervin, attorney, former state representative and former circuit court judge
- Jim Hodges, former governor of South Carolina
- Andy Ingram, Mayor of Cheraw
- Joseph McElveen, Mayor of Sumter
- Wayne Rhodes, Mayor of Kershaw
- Joseph Riley, Mayor of Charleston
- Richard Riley, former United States Secretary of Education and former governor of South Carolina
- Tony Scully, Mayor of Camden
- Ann Taylor, Mayor of Heath Springs
- Junie White, Mayor of Spartanburg
- Steve Wukela, Mayor of Florence

== Independent and third parties ==
=== Candidates ===
==== Declared ====
- Steve French (Libertarian), businessman
- Morgan Bruce Reeves (United Citizens Party), former NFL player and nominee for governor in 2010
- Angry Grandpa (Charles Green) YouTuber, comedian, veteran, former nut salesman, and weed rights activist

==== Withdrew ====
- Tom Ervin (Independent), attorney, former Republican state representative and former circuit court judge (endorsed Sheheen)

==== Declined ====
- André Bauer (Independent), former Republican Lieutenant Governor of South Carolina, candidate for governor in 2010 and candidate for SC-07 in 2012

== General election ==
=== Predictions ===
Source	Ranking	As of
The Cook Political Report	Likely R	November 3, 2014
Sabato's Crystal Ball	Likely R	November 3, 2014
Rothenberg Political Report	Likely R	November 3, 2014
Real Clear Politics	Likely R	November 3, 2014

=== Polling ===
Poll source	Date(s) administered	Sample size	Margin of error	Nikki Haley (R)	Vincent Sheheen (D)	Tom Ervin (I)	Other	Undecided
Daily Journal	October 27–30, 2014	139	—	46%	45%	2%	4%	3%
CBS News/NYT/YouGov	October 16–23, 2014	1,566	± 4%	50%	33%	—	1%	16%
Susquehanna	October 2014	917	± 3.24%	51%	31%	11%	3%	4%
CBS News/NYT/YouGov	September 20–October 1, 2014	2,663	± 2%	53%	36%	—	1%	10%
Crantford Research	September 29, 2014	688	± 3%	41%	37%	7%	—	15%
Winthrop University	September 21–28, 2014	1,082	± 3%	44%	34%	4%	4%	15%
Public Policy Polling^	September 4–5, 2014	793	± 3.5%	50%	45%	—	—	5%
American Research Group	September 2–4, 2014	600	± 4%	43%	33%	18%	1%	5%
CBS News/NYT/YouGov	August 18–September 2, 2014	833	± 5%	56%	35%	—	1%	9%
Rasmussen Reports	August 25–26, 2014	750	± 4%	51%	36%	—	6%	7%
CBS News/NYT/YouGov	July 5–24, 2014	1,186	± 5.4%	55%	38%	—	2%	5%
Palmetto Politics Poll	July 22, 2014	1,000	± 4%	53%	40%	—	—	7%
Palmetto Politics Poll	July 22, 2014	650	± 4%	46%	42%	3%	5%	6%
Public Policy Polling^	June 20–22, 2014	698	± 3.7%	49%	46%	—	—	5%
Rasmussen Reports	April 14–15, 2014	750	± 4%	52%	37%	—	3%	7%
Harper Polling	October 27–28, 2013	676	± 3.77%	48%	39%	—	—	13%
Clarity Campaign Labs	October 15–16, 2013	760	± 3.53%	44%	40%	—	—	16%
Public Policy Polling	December 7–9, 2012	520	± 4.3%	44%	46%	—	—	10%

Hypothetical polling

With Loftis

Poll source	Date(s) administered	Sample size	Margin of error	Curtis Loftis (R)	Vincent Sheheen (D)	Undecided
Public Policy Polling	December 7–9, 2012	520	± 4.3%	37%	46%	17%

With McConnell

Poll source	Date(s) administered	Sample size	Margin of error	Glenn McConnell (R)	Vincent Sheheen (D)	Undecided
Public Policy Polling	December 7–9, 2012	520	± 4.3%	41%	44%	15%

=== Results ===
South Carolina gubernatorial election, 2014
Party	Candidate	Votes	%	±%
Republican	Nikki Haley (incumbent)	696,645	55.90%	+4.53%
Democratic	Vincent Sheheen	516,166	41.42%	−5.49%
Libertarian	Steve French	15,438	1.24%	N/A
Independent	Tom Ervin	11,496	0.92%	N/A
United Citizens	Morgan B. Reeves	5,622	0.45%	−1.05%
Write-in		934	0.07%	-0.16%
Total votes		1,246,301	100.00%	N/A
Republican hold				

==== Counties that flipped from Democratic to Republican ====
- Abbeville (largest city: Abbeville)
- Barnwell (largest city: Barnwell)
- Chester (largest town: Chester)
- Chesterfield (Largest city: Cheraw)
- Colleton (largest city: Walterboro)
- Florence (Largest city: Florence)
- Kershaw (Largest city: Camden)
- McCormick (largest town: McCormick)
- Union (Largest city: Union)
