= Wilton E. Hall =

American politician

Wilton Earle Hall
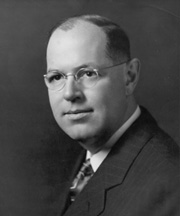

United States Senator from South Carolina
- In office November 20, 1944 – January 3, 1945
- Appointed by: Olin D. Johnston
- Preceded by: Ellison D. Smith
- Succeeded by: Olin D. Johnston

Personal details
- Born: March 11, 1901 Starr, South Carolina
- Died: February 25, 1980 (aged 78) Anderson, South Carolina
- Party: Democratic

Wilton Earle Hall (March 11, 1901 – February 25, 1980) was a United States senator from South Carolina.

Born in Starr, South Carolina, Hall attended public school and then Furman University in (Greenville). He founded a morning newspaper in Anderson, South Carolina in 1924, and in 1929 acquired an evening newspaper. In 1935 he established a radio station, WAIM. From 1934 to 1938, Hall was chairman of the South Carolina Planning Board and was appointed, on November 20, 1944, as a Democrat to the United States Senate to fill the vacancy caused by the death of Ellison D. Smith and served until January 3, 1945. Hall was not a candidate for election to the full term; in fact, Smith had already been defeated for re-election and was only serving out the remainder of his prior term. Hall resumed the newspaper publishing and broadcasting business as publisher of the Anderson Independent and Daily Mail of South Carolina; he also later founded the television station WAIM-TV in 1953 and also founded and owned the radio station WCAC-FM in addition to WAIM. He was also the publisher of Quote Magazine.

Hall resided in Anderson, where he died in 1980; his interment was in a mausoleum at Forest Lawn Memorial Park.

U.S. Senate
Preceded by Ellison D. Smith	U.S. senator from South Carolina; 1944–1945	Succeeded by Olin D. Johnston
