= Radio (2003 film) =

2003 biographical sports drama film by Mike Tollin

- Theatrical release poster
- Directed by: Mike Tollin
- Written by: Mike Rich
- Produced by: Herb Gains; Brian Robbins; Mike Tollin
- Starring: Cuba Gooding Jr.; Ed Harris; Alfre Woodard; Debra Winger
- Cinematography: Don Burgess
- Edited by: Chris Lebenzon; Harvey Rosenstock
- Music by: James Horner
- Production companies: Columbia Pictures; Revolution Studios; Tollin/Robbins Productions
- Distributed by: Sony Pictures Releasing
- Release date: October 24, 2003
- Running time: 109 minutes
- Country: United States
- Language: English
- Budget: $30 million
- Box office: $52.6 million

Radio is a 2003 American biographical sports drama film directed by Mike Tollin. It was inspired by and loosely based on the 1996 Sports Illustrated article "Someone to Lean On" by Gary Smith.

The article and the movie are based on the true story of T. L. Hanna High School football coach Harold Jones (Ed Harris) and a young man with an intellectual disability, James "Radio" Kennedy (Cuba Gooding Jr.). The film co-stars Debra Winger and Alfre Woodard.

It was filmed primarily in Walterboro, South Carolina, and released by Sony Pictures Releasing on October 24, 2003. Radio received predominantly negative reviews and grossed $52.6 million against a $30 million budget.

== Plot ==
In the 1970s, James Robert Kennedy, a 23-year-old intellectually disabled man, lives alone with his mother, a hard-working nurse. He spends much of his day roaming the town with a shopping cart, collecting anything that catches his interest. James often pauses to observe the training sessions of the local high school football team, led by Coach Harold Jones. When a football goes out of bounds during one such session, he hauls it away in his cart. A group of players retaliate the following day by tying him up, locking him in the gear shed, and throwing footballs at the door to scare him.

Jones frees him and punishes the wrongdoers by making them run extra wind sprints after practice. He takes it upon himself to assist in the young man's care and gives him the nickname "Radio" because of his penchant for listening to the radio. Radio begins assisting Coach Jones on the football team, inspiring them before each game as a mascot-type figure. Jones's increased attention to Radio meets with resistance from the football team's parents, who see Radio as a distraction from their own sons' successes.

After the football season ends, Jones involves Radio with several activities within the high school and winds up neglecting his daughter, Mary Helen, a member of the high school's cheerleading squad. At a Christmas Mass, Radio receives several gifts from the townspeople. Mary Helen confides to her father that while she does not blame him for neglecting her, she cannot understand the reason for his interest in Radio.

The following day, Radio distributes the gifts around town. When he encounters a suspicious police officer and is unable to clearly explain his situation, he is arrested on the charge of possessing stolen property. However, the other officers recognize Radio, who is released. To make up for the wrongful arrest, the arresting officer is forced to ferry Radio around town to finish delivering the gifts.

After the holidays, Radio begins taking high school classes to complete his education while also helping Jones's assistant Coach Honeycutt with the basketball team. Star athlete Johnny, one of the football players who had tormented him, tricks Radio into entering the girls' locker room after a practice. Radio is reluctant to tell Coach Jones who set him up, but Jones interviews other players and learns who was responsible. Jones punishes Johnny by benching him for a decisive basketball game, although he soon after apologizes and starts treating Radio better.

When Radio's mother dies of a heart attack, Radio finds himself living alone until his absent older brother Walter finally returns to take care of him. Jones reveals to Mary Helen that his attachment to Radio stems from a childhood incident in which Jones, as a child making a living off delivering newspapers, did not help a mentally-disabled boy his own age, who was crying behind barbed wire. Following the death of Radio's mother, there is growing pressure from the school board to have Radio put in a specialized institution. Jones's involvement with Radio is also blamed for the team's apparent inability to win.

In a meeting with the townspeople, Jones describes Radio as a blessing for the community, saying that Radio has taught them how to treat one another. He then announces his resignation as head coach so that he can spend more time with his family. At Radio's high school graduation, he receives an honorary diploma and a letterman jacket.

The film ends with clips being shown of the real-life Radio and Coach Jones leading the football team.

== Cast ==
- Cuba Gooding Jr. as James "Radio" Kennedy
- Ed Harris as Coach Harold Jones, the head football coach
- Alfre Woodard as Principal Daniels
- S. Epatha Merkerson as Maggie Kennedy, Radio's mother
- Debra Winger as Mrs. Linda Jones, Harold's wife
- Brent Sexton as Coach Honeycutt, assistant football coach and head basketball coach
- Chris Mulkey as Frank Clay, Johnny's father
- Sarah Drew as Mary Helen Jones, Harold and Linda's daughter
- Riley Smith as Johnny Clay
- Patrick Breen as Tucker

== Background ==
The film's lead character, Radio, is based on James Robert "Radio" Kennedy, who was born October 14, 1946 in Anderson, South Carolina. Radio died December 15, 2019.

== Reception ==
On review aggregate Rotten Tomatoes, Radio holds a 35% approval rating, with the consensus reading: "The story is heavy on syrupy uplift and turns Radio into a saint/cuddly pet." The film holds a score of 38 out of 100 on Metacritic. The film grossed $52.6 million against a budget of approximately $30 million. Cuba Gooding Jr. earned a Golden Raspberry Award nomination for Worst Actor for his performance in the film but also an NAACP Image Award for Best Actor in a Motion Picture.

=== Awards and nominations ===
| Award | Category | Subject | Result |
|---|---|---|---|
| Black Reel Awards | Best Actor | Cuba Gooding Jr. | Nominated |
| CAMIE Awards | Theatrical release | Todd Garner | Won |
| CAMIE Awards | Theatrical release | Michael Tollin | Won |
| CAMIE Awards | Theatrical release | Mike Rich | Won |
| CAMIE Awards | Theatrical release | Cuba Gooding Jr. | Won |
| CAMIE Awards | Theatrical release | Ed Harris | Won |
| CAMIE Awards | Theatrical release | Alfre Woodard | Won |
| CAMIE Awards | Theatrical release | Riley Smith | Won |
| CAMIE Awards | Theatrical release | Brent Sexton | Won |
| CAMIE Awards | Theatrical release | S. Epatha Merkerson | Won |
| CAMIE Awards | Theatrical release | Sarah Drew | Won |
| ESPY Award | Best Sports Movie | | Nominated |
| NAACP Image Award | Outstanding Actor | Cuba Gooding Jr. | Won |
| NAACP Image Award | Supporting Actress | Alfre Woodard | Won |
| Golden Raspberry Award | Worst Actor | Cuba Gooding Jr. | Nominated |

== Soundtrack ==
The soundtrack to Radio was released on October 21, 2003.

| No. | Title | Artist | Length |
|---|---|---|---|
| 1. | "Eyes Of The Heart (Radio's Song)" | India.Arie | 4:44 |
| 2. | "We Can Work It Out" | Stevie Wonder | 3:18 |
| 3. | "That Lady – Pt. 1" | The Isley Brothers | 3:15 |
| 4. | "I'll Be Around" | The Spinners | 3:14 |
| 5. | "If You Don't Know Me By Now" | Harold Melvin & the Blue Notes | 3:29 |
| 6. | "Sha La La (Make Me Happy)" | Al Green | 2:59 |
| 7. | "We're An American Band" | Grand Funk Railroad | 3:28 |
| 8. | "China Grove" | The Doobie Brothers | 3:17 |
| 9. | "Wake Up Everybody (Part 1)" | Harold Melvin & the Blue Notes | 3:45 |
| 10. | "The Rubberband Man" | The Spinners | 3:36 |
| 11. | "Be Thankful for What You Got" | William DeVaughn | 3:28 |
| 12. | "Going In Circles" | The Friends of Distinction | 4:11 |
| 13. | "Radio's Day" | James Horner featuring vocals by India.Arie | 4:21 |
| 14. | "Gift of the Ball" | James Horner | 1:47 |
| 15. | "Learning The Ropes" | James Horner | 1:55 |
| 16. | "Being Left Behind" | James Horner | 2:42 |
| 17. | "Resignation" | James Horner | 4:43 |
| 18. | "Never So Alone" | James Horner featuring vocals by India.Arie | 7:14 |
| 19. | "Night Game" | James Horner | 2:41 |
| 20. | "Radio" | Chuck Brodsky | 4:08 |
| Total length: | | | 71:46 |

== See also ==
- List of American football films
- List of teachers portrayed in films
- White savior narrative in film
- The Blind Side (film)
