= WWDL =

- Plainfield, Indiana; United States
- Broadcast area: Southwest Indianapolis Metropolitan Area
- Frequency: 91.3 MHz
- Branding: The Life FM

Programming
- Format: Southern gospel
- Affiliations: The Life FM

Ownership
- Owner: The Power Foundation

Technical information
- Licensing authority: FCC
- Facility ID: 91476
- Class: A
- ERP: 295 watts
- HAAT: 43 meters (141 ft)
- Transmitter coordinates: 39°40′18″N 86°21′30″W

Links
- Public license information: Public file; LMS
- Webcast: Listen live
- Website: thelifefm.com

WWDL (91.3 FM) is a Christian radio station licensed to Plainfield, Indiana. The station serves Southwestern Indianapolis and its Southwest Suburbs, and is owned by The Power Foundation. WWDL airs southern gospel music and Christian talk and teaching.

== History ==
Former logo

The station was formerly known as "The Walk", and was owned by Horizon Christian Fellowship of Indianapolis. As "The Walk", WWDL aired a variety of Christian Talk and Teaching programs including; Back to the Bible with Woodrow Kroll, Thru the Bible with J. Vernon McGee, and Kay Arthur.

Previous logo

On May 7, 2015, Horizon Christian Fellowship of Indianapolis filed an application to sell WWDL (and three CPs for translators) to The Power Foundation. The assignee assumed the operations of the station on June 1, 2015. The sale was approved by the FCC on August 3, 2015, and consummated on October 1, 2015, at a purchase price of $140,000.
