= WWQT =

- Tryon, North Carolina; United States
- Frequency: 1160 kHz
- Branding: The Life FM

Programming
- Format: Southern gospel
- Affiliations: The Life FM

Ownership
- Owner: The Power Foundation

History
- Former call signs: WTYN (?-1994); WKJT (1994–1996); WJFJ (1996–2014)

Technical information
- Licensing authority: FCC
- Facility ID: 54614
- Class: B
- Power: 25,000 watts day 500 watts night
- Transmitter coordinates: 35°14′17.00″N 82°14′34.00″W
- Translator: 98.3 W252EJ (Hendersonville)

Links
- Public license information: Public file; LMS
- Webcast: Listen Live
- Website: thelifefm.com/wwqt/

WWQT (1160 AM) is a radio station broadcasting a southern gospel format. Licensed to Tryon, North Carolina, United States, the station is currently owned by The Power Foundation.

== History ==
The station went on the air as WKJT on February 1, 1994, and was formerly WTYN, a station which began in 1954. On August 9, 1996, the station changed its call sign to WJFJ, and again to the current WWQT on March 20, 2014.

WWQT is the only broadcast station based in Polk County, North Carolina, and is owned by John Owens and Joe Foster of Columbus Broadcasting.

In 2004 and 2005, WJFJ RADIO personality James A. Metcalf was voted as a top ten nominee in the Singing News Magazine's fan awards as one of the nations top ten small market southern gospel DJs. The Singing News is one of Christian music's biggest selling magazines and features the subscriber voted awards each year. WWQT radio is also involved in many Polk County community events, co-sponsoring the singing for the soldiers events and the Columbus Fire Department BBQ sing, which has continued since 1973. WWQT does yearly live broadcasts at the Columbus Farm Festival, and the Green Creek Heritage Festival as well as other community events.

In November 2009, the station began live streaming 24 hours a day worldwide on its website www.wjfjradio.com.

WWQT hosts several annual and biannual events in Polk County, including the Columbus BBQ GOSPEL SING, and The SINGING FOR THE SOLDIERS EVENTS. WWQT is distinguished for its gospel music programming. WWQT also uses the nickname Wolverine Radio in reference to the broadcasting of local Polk County High School Wolverine football.

== Translator ==
Call sign	Frequency	City of license	FID	ERP (W)	HAAT	FCC info
W252EJ	98.3 FM	Hendersonville, NC	202532	102	107 m (351 ft)	LMS
