= The Life FM =

American Christian radio network

- Country: United States
- Branding: The Life FM

Programming
- Format: Southern Gospel music

Ownership
- Owner: The Power Foundation

History
- Launch date: 2010

Links
- Webcast: Listen Live
- Website: www.thelifefm.com

The Life FM is a network of Christian radio stations in the United States, broadcasting southern gospel music.

== History ==
Previous logo

In 2015, 103.1 WHQA in Honea Path, South Carolina became the flagship station of The Life FM, after the station, then WRIX-FM, was donated to The Power Foundation.

== Stations ==
The Life FM is currently heard on 19 full-powered stations, 6 translators, and 2 HD signals with stations in Alabama, Georgia, Illinois, Indiana, Mississippi, North Carolina, South Carolina and Tennessee.

=== Owned and operated stations ===
| Call sign | Frequency | City of license | State | Facility ID | Class | Power (W) | ERP (W) | Height (m (ft)) |
|---|---|---|---|---|---|---|---|---|
| WBNB | 91.3 FM | Equality | Alabama | 173302 | C2 | — | 26,000 | 54 m (177 ft) |
| WILF | 88.9 FM | Monroeville | Alabama | 89620 | C1 | — | 87,000 | 118 m (387 ft) |
| WWQA | 90.7 FM | Albany | Georgia | 36447 | A | — | 5,500 | 93 m (305 ft) |
| WWQE | 89.7 FM | Elberton | Georgia | 175775 | A | — | 1,150 | 95 m (312 ft) |
| WQTS | 102.9 FM | Statesboro | Georgia | 51398 | C3 | — | 25,000 | 100 m (330 ft) |
| WWQC | 107.3 FM | Clifton | Illinois | 185080 | A | — | 6,000 | 96.3 m (316 ft) |
| WSWS | 89.9 FM | Smithboro | Illinois | 177172 | A | — | 2,000 | 110 m (360 ft) |
| WWQI | 91.3 FM | Morristown | Indiana | 172815 | B1 | — | 5,000 horizontal 14,500 vertical | 56 m (184 ft) |
| WWDL | 91.3 FM | Plainfield | Indiana | 91476 | A | — | 295 | 43 m (141 ft) |
| WWQD | 90.3 FM | De Kalb | Mississippi | 171740 | A | — | 4,000 vertical | 81 m (266 ft) |
| WWQY | 90.3 FM | Lexington | North Carolina | 175503 | A | — | 1,600 | 32.1 m (105 ft) |
| WWQT | 1160 AM | Tryon | North Carolina | 54614 | B | 25,000 day 500 night | — | — |
| WABB | 1390 AM | Belton | South Carolina | 10076 | B | 1,000 day 17 night | — | — |
| WHQB | 90.5 FM | Gray Court | South Carolina | 173384 | C2 | — | 21,000 vertical | 136 m (446 ft) |
| WHQA (Note: Flagship station) | 103.1 FM | Honea Path | South Carolina | 21830 | A | — | 6,000 | 100 m (330 ft) |
| WLFW | 92.7 FM | Johnston | South Carolina | 18656 | A | — | 1,800 | 176 m (577 ft) |
| WWQS | 88.5 FM | Decatur | Tennessee | 173912 | A | — | 6,000 | 94 m (308 ft) |
| WWQK | 88.7 FM | Oak Ridge | Tennessee | 176955 | C2 | — | 4,800 horizontal 2,900 vertical | 324 m (1,063 ft) |
| WWQW | 90.3 FM | Wartburg | Tennessee | 174041 | A | — | 120 | 314 m (1,030 ft) |

==== Translators ====
| Call sign | Frequency (MHz) | City of license | State | Facility ID |
|---|---|---|---|---|
| W246DF | 97.1 | Americus | Georgia | 141675 |
| W278BY | 103.5 | Muncie | Indiana | 143722 |
| W271BY | 102.1 | Pendleton | Indiana | 143506 |
| W252EJ | 98.3 | Hendersonville | North Carolina | 202532 |
| W286DD | 105.1 | Anderson | South Carolina | 200692 |
| W290BW | 105.9 | Greenville | South Carolina | 156090 |

=== HD Radio affiliates ===
| Call sign | Frequency | City of license | State | Facility ID | ERP (W) |
|---|---|---|---|---|---|
| WLBC-FMHD3 | 104.1-3 FM (HD) | Muncie | Indiana | 17602 | 41,000 |
| WTPT-HD2 | 93.3-2 FM (HD) | Forest City | North Carolina | 4677 | 93,000 |
