= Terence Roberts =

American politician

Mayor of Anderson, South Carolina
- Incumbent
- Assumed office July 1, 2006
- Preceded by: Richard Shirley

Personal details
- Born: 1959 or 1960 (age 66–67) Anderson SC
- Party: Holds a non-partisan office
- Spouse: Natalie H Roberts
- Education: B.A. Winthrop University
- Profession: insurance, business owner

Terence Roberts (born 1959/1960) is the current mayor of Anderson, South Carolina, the county seat of Anderson County, South Carolina. Serving since July 1, 2006, he is the first African-American mayor of the city.

== Biography ==
Terence Roberts was born on November 26, 1959 (aged 62). He was raised in Anderson and is a 1978 graduate of Westside High School in Anderson. He graduated with a B.A. in marketing from Winthrop University. After school he started his own insurance agency.

In 2006, he defeated 2-term incumbent mayor Richard Shirley by a vote of 2,219 to 1,887 becoming the first Black mayor of the city.

He was certified as the winner of the April 8, 2018, election, as the only candidate for mayor, and automatically reelected for a fourth term, July 1, 2018, to June 30, 2022.
