= WWQA =

Radio station in Albany, Georgia

Albany, Georgia; United States
- Broadcast area: Albany GA area
- Frequency: 90.7 MHz
- Branding: The Life FM

Programming
- Format: Southern Gospel
- Affiliations: The Life FM

Ownership
- Owner: The Power Foundation

History
- First air date: 1987-11-30 (as WGNP)
- Former call signs: WGNP (1987–2002); WWXC (2002–2008); WWVO (2008–2014)

Technical information
- Licensing authority: FCC
- Facility ID: 36447
- Class: A
- ERP: 5,500 watts
- HAAT: 93 meters (305 ft)
- Transmitter coordinates: 31°38′42.00″N 84°21′15.00″W

Links
- Public license information: Public file; LMS
- Webcast: Listen Live
- Website: https://thelifefm.com/georgia/

WWQA (90.7 FM) is a Christian radio station broadcasting a Southern gospel format as an affiliate of The Life FM. Licensed to Albany, Georgia, United States, the station serves the Albany area. The station is currently owned by The Power Foundation.

== History ==
The station went on the air as WGNP on November 30, 1987. On December 31, 2002, the station changed its call sign to WWXC, on March 4, 2008, to WWVO, and on October 30, 2014, to the current WWQA.
