= James "Radio" Kennedy =

American with disabilities (1947–2019)

Radio Kennedy
- Born: James Robert Kennedy; October 14, 1946; Anderson, South Carolina, U.S.
- Died: December 15, 2019 (aged 73); Anderson, South Carolina, U.S.
- Known for: Association with the T. L. Hanna High School football team; Subject of Radio

James Robert "Radio" Kennedy (October 14, 1946 – December 15, 2019) was an American man with an intellectual disability due to a genetic disorder who was known for his association with the T. L. Hanna High School football team, in Anderson, South Carolina. Kennedy first gained prominence in 1996, when Gary Smith wrote an article about him for Sports Illustrated titled "Someone to Lean On." Kennedy's story was then made into a feature film in 2003, Radio, in which he was portrayed by Cuba Gooding Jr.

== Biography ==
James Robert Kennedy was born on October 14, 1946, in Anderson to parents Bill Kennedy and Janie Mae Bolden Greenlee.

According to Sheila Hilton, the former principal of T.L. Hanna High School, Kennedy earned the nickname "Radio" in the mid-1960s, when he began to show up at the school football field with a transistor radio. In 1964, Kennedy befriended the school's football coach, Harold Jones. Their friendship served as the basis of the 2003 film Radio, starring Cuba Gooding Jr. as Kennedy and Ed Harris as Jones. In 1965, Kennedy became an unofficial 11th-grade student at T.L. Hanna High. Kennedy was considered a permanent high school junior, meaning that he would never graduate or have to leave.

== Recognition ==
In 2006, a statue of Kennedy was unveiled at the football stadium of T.L. Hanna High. In 2016, Kennedy was inducted into the T.L. Hanna Athletic Hall of Fame.

== Later years ==
According to Jones, Kennedy had been treated for pancreatitis, as well as diabetes and kidney issues. Kennedy died on December 15, 2019, in Anderson at the age of 73. At the time of his death, Kennedy was living with his brother George and niece Jackie.
