= WHQA =

Radio station in Honea Path, South Carolina

Coordinates: 34.425°N 82.540°W

- Honea Path, South Carolina; United States
- Broadcast area: Upstate South Carolina
- Frequency: 103.1 MHz
- Branding: The Life FM 103.1

Programming
- Format: Southern Gospel
- Affiliations: The Life FM

Ownership
- Owner: Power Foundation; (Power Foundation)
- Sister stations: WABB

History
- First air date: June 10, 1977 (as WRIX)
- Former call signs: WRIX (1977–1986); WRIX-FM (1986–2015)

Technical information
- Licensing authority: FCC
- Facility ID: 21830
- Class: A
- ERP: 6,000 watts
- HAAT: 100 meters

Links
- Public license information: Public file; LMS
- Webcast: Listen live
- Website: thelife1031.com/

WHQA is a Southern Gospel station located in the Upstate region of South Carolina. The station is licensed by the Federal Communications Commission (FCC) to the town of Honea Path and broadcasts on 103.1 MHz with an effective radiated power (ERP) of 6 kW. Its signal can be heard mainly in the Anderson part of the Greenville–Spartanburg radio market; however, the signal reaches well into Greenville, parts of Spartanburg, and surrounding areas.

The station carries a variety of local programming in the mornings, evenings, and weekends.

== Programming ==
On November 28, 2014, WRIX-FM flipped to a Classic Hits format featuring music from the 1960s–'80s. On March 1, 2015, WRIX-FM changed its call letters to WHQA. The format was also changed from Classic Hits to a Southern gospel music format and included local news, weather and community events.

The former Classic Hits format has moved to sister station WANS 1280 (also on FM at 107.7), and Sunday mornings and evenings feature local church broadcasts. WANS also features Anderson University basketball and community programming and local news.

== History ==
WRIX-FM was founded by the late Matt Phillips (who also started WCCP 1560 in 1969 in Clemson, South Carolina). WRIX-FM signed on the air June 10, 1977 featuring a Top 40 format. The station presented many live remotes broadcasting live from various sponsors. In 1983, the station changed to Classic-leaning Country as "X103" and added a daytime-only AM station in 1986 when WRIX signed on. WRIX-FM has aired many local sporting events, local news, death and crime announcements for many years.

Phillips received many awards and recognitions for the station's commitment to community service including the Order of the Palmetto, South Carolina's highest civilian honor.

The Matt and Bev Morning Show began around 1980. Phillips and Beverly Ovelle Lockridge, know on air as Bev Brandon, started out broadcasting from the main studio on Main Street in Honea Path, later moving to a booth constructed especially for the show at the Anderson, South Carolina Dunkin' Donuts on North Main Street. The show became the station's most popular program and one of Upstate S.C.'s top-rated morning shows.

Lockridge, one of the area's first female radio personalities, received the Order of the Palmetto from Gov. David Beasley in 1996. She was known for her charity work, especially at Christmas, collecting thousands of toys and other goods for those in need. Lockridge died on December 11, 2010.

Phillips, the station's founder and operator, died in August 1997. His funeral was attended by hundreds, including the Governor and Lt. Governor. His wife, Jeannette, took over and ran the station until her own death about ten months later. Their daughter, Karen Phillips Small, then took over management of the station.

After Phillips' death, John Woodson, station manager, stepped in to help continue the live, local morning show with Brandon until 2002. When Woodson left to teach broadcasting at Tri-County Technical College, Michael "Porkchop" Branch continued the tradition of a locally-produced morning show.

Joel Kay, who has been with the station from the beginning, received the South Carolina Broadcasters Association's Star Award for Top Sportscaster for his many years of announcing Belton Honea Path High School Bears football. All BHP games and programming will continue on WHQA.

Local news veteran Paul Brown has provided news for WRIX for nearly 30 years. He now does the same for WHQA and sister station WANS.

WRIX-FM purchased WANS in late 1993. Its format has been "Music of Your Life", Beach music, talk and Oldies/Classic Hits. In 2011 WRIX-FM returned to talk as Talk Radio 103.1.

Tom Ervin purchased WRIX in 2013. In late 2014, he donated WRIX 1020, WRIX-FM 103.1, WANS 1280 and WANS-FM 107.7 to a non-profit group called the Power Foundation.

Blues artist Kip Anderson and singer-songwriters Bob Edison and Jimmy Gilstrap had radio shows on WRIX FM and WANS AM. Willis H.Crosby also worked at WRIX (AM) Gospel in the 90s. Well-known beach DJ Jerry Peeler broadcast his Saturday show on sister station WANS.
