= Preston Jones (gridiron football) =

American football player (born 1970)

No. 5, 14, 8
- Position: Quarterback

Personal information
- Born: July 3, 1970 (age 56); Anderson, South Carolina, U.S.
- Listed height: 6 ft 3 in (1.91 m)
- Listed weight: 223 lb (101 kg)

Career information
- High school: T. L. Hanna (Anderson)
- College: Georgia (1988–1992)
- NFL draft: 1993: undrafted

Career history
- Philadelphia Eagles (1993); Las Vegas Posse (1994); Atlanta Falcons (1995)*; Shreveport Pirates (1995); London Monarchs (1996–1997)
- * Offseason or practice squad member only

Preston Wayne Jones (born July 3, 1970) is an American former professional football quarterback who played for the Las Vegas Posse and Shreveport Pirates of the Canadian Football League (CFL) and the London Monarchs of the World League of American Football (WLAF). He played college football at the University of Georgia. He was also a member of the Philadelphia Eagles and Atlanta Falcons of the National Football League (NFL).

== Early life ==
Preston Wayne Jones was born on July 3, 1970, in Anderson, South Carolina. He played high school football at T. L. Hanna High School in Anderson and earned Parade All-American honors his senior year.

== College career ==
Jones played college football for the Georgia Bulldogs of the University of Georgia. He redshirted in 1988 and was a four-year letterman from 1989 to 1992. He completed 42 of 93 passes (45.2%) for 568 yards, three touchdowns, and six interceptions in 1989, 33 of 73 passes (45.2%) for 363 yards, one touchdown, and seven interceptions in 1990, two of four passes for 13 yards and one touchdown in 1991, and ten of 15 passes for 122 yards and one touchdown in 1992.

== Professional career ==
After going undrafted in the 1993 NFL draft, Jones signed with the Philadelphia Eagles on May 11. He was waived on August 23 but re-signed on August 31. He was waived again on October 5 and signed to the team's practice squad on October 7. Jones was promoted to the active roster on October 13 but did not appear in any games for the Eagles. He became a free agent after the season and re-signed with the Eagles on May 18, 1994. He was waived on August 23, 1994.

Jones then played in nine games for the Las Vegas Posse of the Canadian Football League (CFL) during the 1994 CFL season, recording 23 completions on 53 passing attempts (43.4%) for 361 yards, one touchdown, and three interceptions.

He was signed by the Atlanta Falcons on March 17, 1995. He was later waived on August 21, 1995.

Jones played in one game for the Shreveport Pirates of the CFL in 1995 but did not record any statistics.

He played for the London Monarchs of the World League of American Football during the 1996 season, completing 152 of 295 passes (51.5%) for 1,649 yards, 12 touchdowns, and seven interceptions. The Monarchs finished the season with a 4–6 record. He completed 22 of 42 passes (52.4%) for 276 yards, two touchdowns, and two interceptions for the Monarchs in 1997.

== Personal life ==
Jones later worked in the banking industry. In 2012, he returned to his alma mater, T. L. Hanna High, as a wide receivers coach.
