= Cuba Gooding Jr. =

American actor (born 1968)

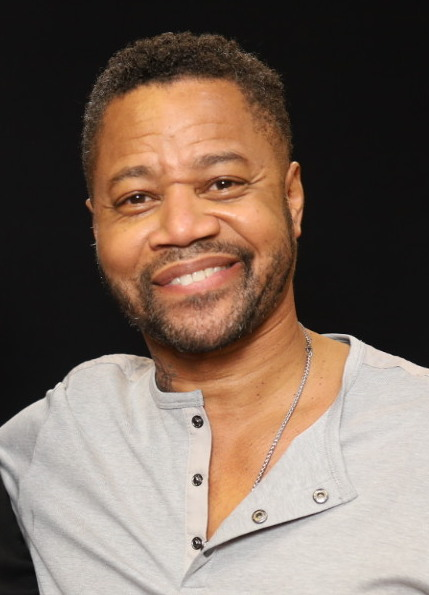
- Gooding in 2022
- Born: Cuba Mark Gooding Jr. January 2, 1968 (age 58); New York City, U.S.
- Occupation: Actor
- Years active: 1984–present
- Spouse: Sara Kapfer (m. 1994; div. 2017)
- Children: 3, including Mason Gooding
- Parent(s): Cuba Gooding Sr. Shirley Sullivan
- Relatives: Omar Gooding (brother)
- Awards: Academy Award for Best Supporting Actor

Cuba Mark Gooding Jr. (born January 2, 1968) is an American actor. After his breakthrough role as Tre Styles in Boyz n the Hood (1991), he won the Academy Award for Best Supporting Actor playing a football star in Jerry Maguire (1996). His other notable films include A Few Good Men (1992), Judgment Night (1993), Lightning Jack (1994), As Good as It Gets (1997), Men of Honor (2000), Pearl Harbor (2001), Snow Dogs (2002), Radio (2003), Norbit (2007), Linewatch (2008), and he played Dr. Ben Carson in the film Gifted Hands (2009). He played in Red Tails (2012), and The Butler (2013). He has done voice acting in Home on the Range (2004) and The Land Before Time XIII: The Wisdom of Friends (2007).

For his portrayal of O. J. Simpson in the FX drama series The People v. O. J. Simpson: American Crime Story (2016), he earned a nomination for the Primetime Emmy Award for Outstanding Lead Actor in a Limited Series or Movie. He also co-starred that year in the FX series American Horror Story: Roanoke (2016).

Gooding made his Broadway debut playing Ludie Watts in the 2013 revival of the Horton Foote play The Trip to Bountiful. In 2018, he played Billy Flynn in the musical Chicago in both the West End and on Broadway.

== Early life and education ==
Cuba Mark Gooding Jr. was born on January 2, 1968, in the Bronx, New York City. His mother, Shirley Sullivan, was a singer, and his father, Cuba Gooding Sr., was the lead vocalist of soul group The Main Ingredient. Gooding has three siblings: April, Omar, and Thomas. His paternal grandfather, Dudley MacDonald Gooding, was a native of Barbados.

His family moved from New York to Los Angeles in 1972, after his father's music group had their hit single "Everybody Plays the Fool"; two years later, the elder Gooding left the family. Gooding was raised by his mother and attended four different high schools: North Hollywood High School, Tustin High School, Apple Valley High School, and John F. Kennedy High School in Granada Hills in Los Angeles. Showing leadership, he served as class president in three of them. He had become a born-again Christian at the age of 13.

== Career ==
=== 1984–1996: Early roles and Jerry Maguire ===
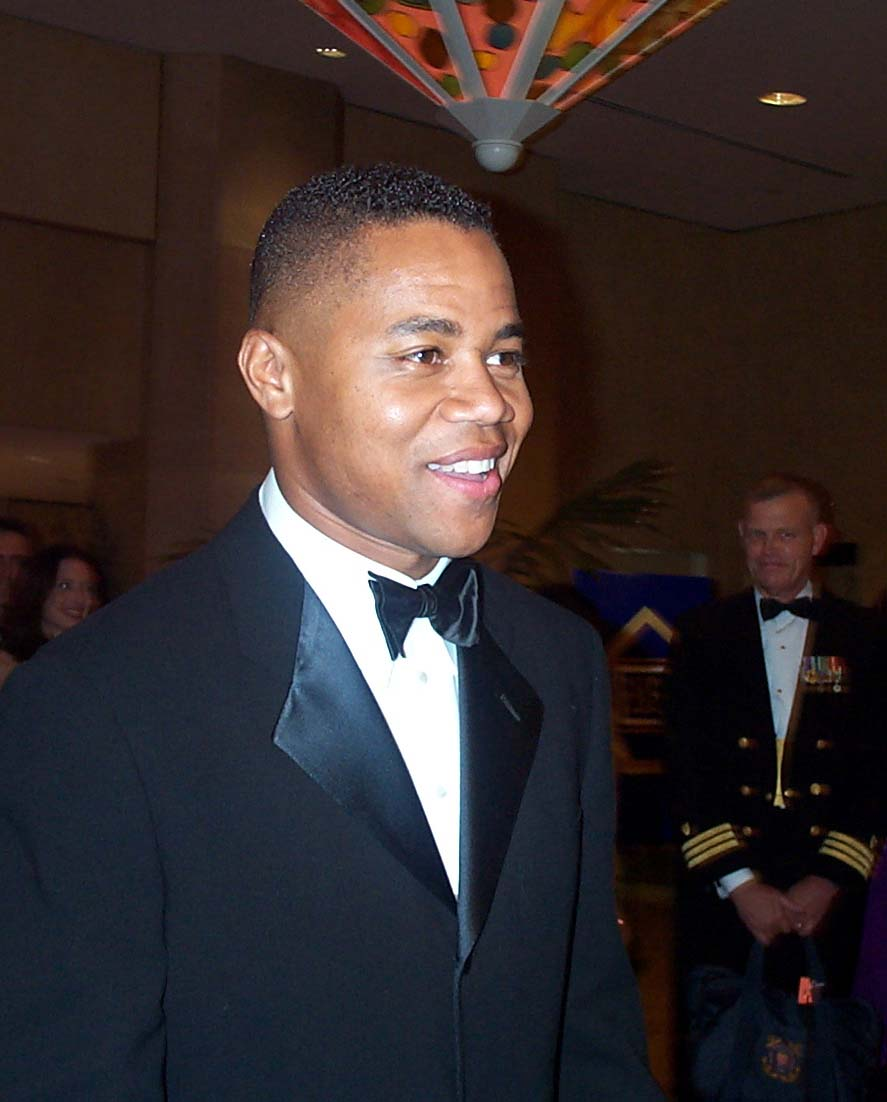
Gooding in 2000

Gooding's first job as an entertainer was as a breakdancer, performing with singer Lionel Richie at the closing ceremonies of the 1984 Summer Olympics in Los Angeles. After high school, Gooding studied Japanese martial arts for three years before turning his focus toward acting.

Early on, he landed guest starring roles on shows such as Hill Street Blues (1987), Amen (1988) and MacGyver (1988, 1989 and 1990). He also had a small part in the popular comedy Coming to America (1988).

Gooding's first major role was the lead in John Singleton's inner-city crime drama Boyz n the Hood (1991), in which he played Tre Styles. The film was a box office surprise success and critical hit. It is now considered a modern classic. Gooding followed this success with supporting roles in major films such as A Few Good Men and Gladiator (both 1992), Judgment Night (1993), Lightning Jack (1994), and Outbreak (1995). He played Billy Roberts in the HBO film The Tuskegee Airmen (1995).

In 1996, Gooding reached a new level of prominence when he was cast as an arrogant yet charismatic football player in Cameron Crowe's dramatic sports comedy Jerry Maguire (1996), co-starring with Tom Cruise. The film was a major critical and commercial success and was nominated for the Academy Award for Best Picture; Gooding won an Oscar for Best Supporting Actor. His exuberant "Show me the money!" line in the film became a nationwide catchphrase. His Oscar acceptance speech has often been cited for its enthusiasm.

=== 1997–2012: Established actor ===
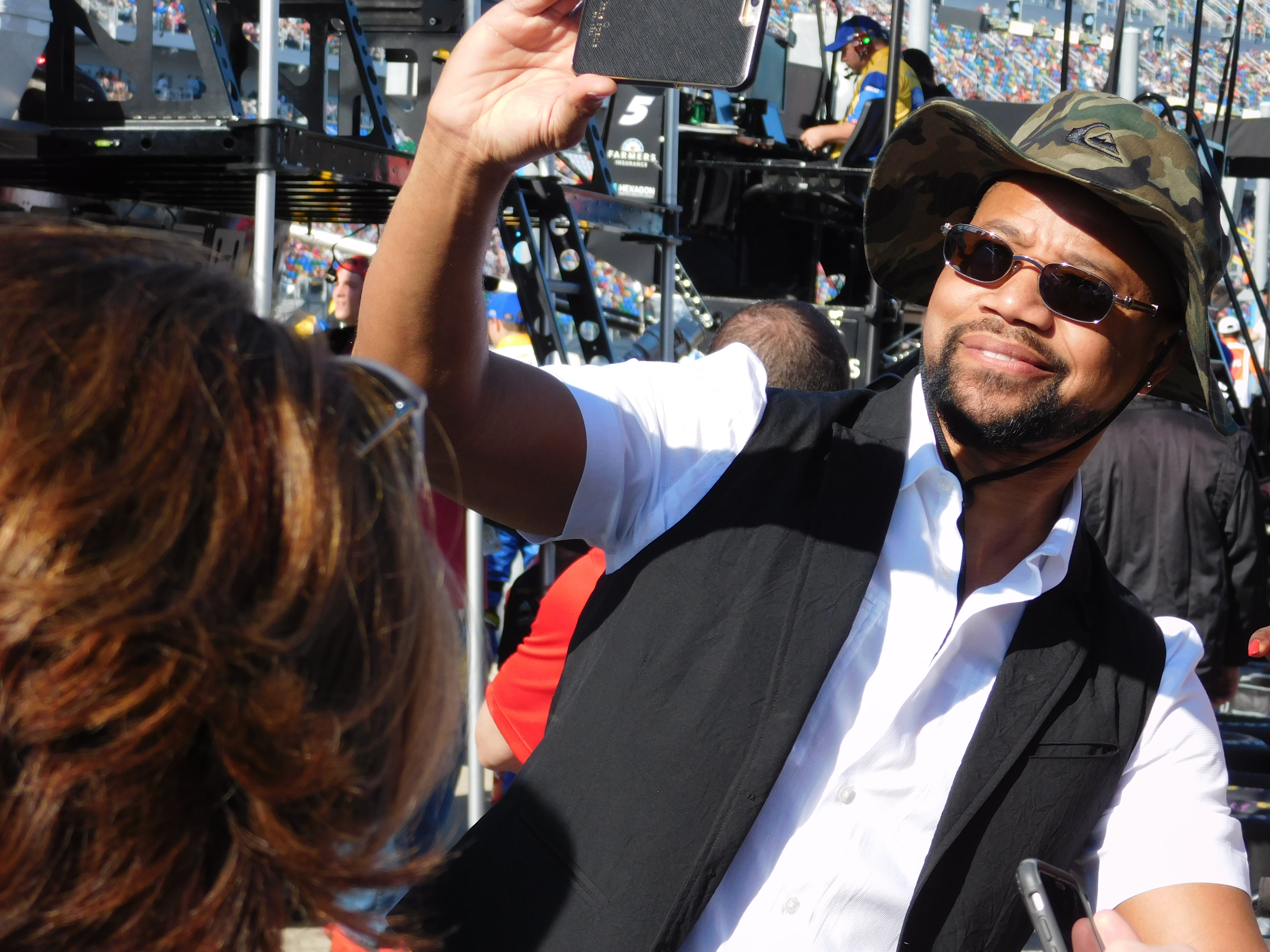
Gooding at the 2016 Daytona 500

In 1997, Gooding followed his breakout with a notable supporting role in the acclaimed Academy Award-winning comedy As Good as It Gets (1997). In the following years, his career was inconsistently successful. Some of his best-received performances include turns in films such as the mystical drama What Dreams May Come (1998) and the US Naval drama Men of Honor (2000), in which he played the lead role and co-starred with Robert De Niro. Gooding also received attention for his roles in the epic Pearl Harbor (2001) as Doris Miller, the ensemble farce Rat Race (2001), musical dramedy The Fighting Temptations (2003), and the football drama Radio (2003), in which he played the title role. Additionally, though not well received critically, the family comedy Snow Dogs (2002) was a commercial success. In 2002, he was given a star on the Hollywood Walk of Fame. Gooding starred in an online video game called "The Quest For The Code" which focuses on juvenile asthma management.

Other roles during this time include Theo Caulder in the psychological thriller Instinct (1999). He voiced Buck the Horse in the Disney animated film Home on the Range (2004). However, during this stage of his career, he appeared in a series of films that were not critically or commercially successful, such as Chill Factor (1999), Boat Trip (2002), Norbit (2007) and Daddy Day Camp (2007), all of which received extremely negative reviews and, except for Norbit, performed poorly at the box office.

Since then, in contrast to earlier stages of his acting career, Gooding has appeared in more critically ignored, direct-to-DVD films than theatrical or television releases. A well-received performance as Ben Carson in the TNT film Gifted Hands: The Ben Carson Story (2009), and a small supporting role in Ridley Scott's American Gangster (2007), both proved to be exceptions to this trend.

Gooding's next major film role was in the 2012 World War II film Red Tails, produced by George Lucas. In 2012, Gooding starred in a TV pilot for Fox called Guilty, which was directed by McG. Though it was well received in screenings, it was ultimately not picked up by the network. He appeared on Channel 4's Chris Moyles' Quiz Night on August 5, 2011, closing the show in a duet, "Bad Romance", with Lulu.

=== 2013–present: Broadway debut and TV roles ===
In 2013, Gooding had roles in several theatrical release films, including a well-received supporting performance in Lee Daniels's The Butler and brief appearances in Don Jon and Machete Kills.

He made his Broadway theatre debut alongside Cicely Tyson and Vanessa Williams in a Tony Award-nominated production of The Trip to Bountiful.

In 2014, he appeared as Civil Rights Movement attorney Fred Gray in the widely acclaimed historical drama Selma. He has since appeared more frequently in television productions, including performances as Samuel Fraunces in the miniseries The Book of Negroes, as a comedically embellished version of himself on Big Time in Hollywood, FL, and as O. J. Simpson in the anthology series American Crime Story: The People v. O. J. Simpson.

Although his performance as 'OJ' received mixed reviews, he received a Primetime Emmy Award nomination for Outstanding Lead Actor in a Miniseries or a Movie. Some reviewers criticized the nomination. In 2018, Gooding headlined the 21st anniversary revival of the musical Chicago at the Phoenix Theatre in the West End, playing Billy Flynn.

His directorial debut, Bayou Caviar, was released on October 5, 2018. On March 3, 2018, Gooding appeared as star guest announcer on the 100th episode of ITV's Ant and Dec's Saturday Night Takeaway.

== Personal life ==
=== Marriage ===
In 1994, Gooding married his high school sweetheart, Sara Kapfer. They had three children together: Spencer Gooding, Piper Gooding, and Mason Gooding, who followed him into acting.

Twenty years later, in 2014, Kapfer filed for legal separation from Gooding. Gooding filed for divorce in January 2017.

=== Charity work ===
In 2006, Gooding earned the Public Leadership in Neurology Award from the American Academy of Neurology for his work raising awareness about multiple sclerosis.

=== Sexual misconduct allegations ===
On June 13, 2019, Gooding was booked on charges of misdemeanor forcible touching and sexual abuse in the third degree in New York City, relating to an incident in which he allegedly groped a woman at a bar in Times Square. On October 10, he was indicted on a separate, additional sexual abuse charge. As of August 2020, 30 women have accused Gooding of unwanted sexual touching.

Gooding was formally charged for three incidents, each resulting in misdemeanor charges of forcible touching and third-degree sexual abuse.

On August 19, 2020, a woman filed a lawsuit against Gooding, accusing him of raping her in 2013 in New York City. The two parties came to a settlement agreement on June 6, 2023. As a result of the settlement, Gooding will not face trial. Gooding's lawyers insisted that he and the woman had had consensual sex, saying that the woman had bragged afterwards to others that she had sex with a celebrity.

On April 12, 2022, Gooding pleaded guilty to forcibly touching a woman at a New York nightclub in 2018, telling the judge he "kissed the waitress on her lips" without her consent. He also admitted to the two other alleged incidents of non-consensual contact, which took place in October 2018 and June 2019.

Gooding reached a plea deal with prosecutors that did not require time in jail. He was allowed to withdraw his misdemeanor plea and plead to the lesser violation of harassment on the condition that he continue counseling for six months.

On February 26, 2024, Gooding was mentioned in a sexual assault lawsuit brought against Sean Combs by music producer Rodney Jones. The lawsuit alleged that Gooding had "groped and fondled [Jones] non-consensually." On March 26, Jones amended the lawsuit to include Gooding as a co-defendant.

== Acting credits ==
=== Film ===
Year	Title	Role	Notes
1988	Coming to America	Boy Getting Haircut	
1989	Sing	Stanley	
1991	Boyz n the Hood	Jason "Tre" Styles III	
1992	Gladiator	Abraham Lincoln Haines	
1992	Judgment	Officer Alvarez	
1992	A Few Good Men	Corporal Carl Edward Hammaker	
1993	Judgment Night	Mike Peterson	
1994	Lightning Jack	Ben Doyle	
1994	Blown Away	Bomb Squad Class Member	Cameo
1995	Outbreak	Major Salt	
1995	Losing Isaiah	Eddie Hughes	
1996	Jerry Maguire	Rod Tidwell	
1997	Trading Favors	Liquor Store Clerk	
1997	As Good as It Gets	Frank Sachs	
1998	What Dreams May Come	Albert Lewis	
1998	Welcome to Hollywood	Himself	Cameo
1998	A Murder of Crows	Lawson Russell	Also producer
1999	Instinct	Theo Caulder	
1999	Chill Factor	Arlo	
2000	Men of Honor	BM2 /Chief / Senior Chief Carl Brashear	
2000	The Kid	Wedding Guest	Uncredited cameo
2001	Pearl Harbor	Petty Officer Doris Miller	
2001	Rat Race	Owen Templeton	
2001	In the Shadows	FBI Agent Draven	
2001	Zoolander	Himself	Cameo
2002	Snow Dogs	Theodore "Ted" Brooks	
2002	Boat Trip	Jerry Robinson	
2003	The Fighting Temptations	Darrin Hill	
2003	Radio	James Robert "Radio" Kennedy	
2004	Home on the Range	Buck The Domestic Horse	Voice
2005	Shadowboxer	Mikey	
2005	Dirty	Salim Adel	
2006	End Game	Alex Thomas	Direct-to-video
2007	Norbit	Deion Hughes	
2007	What Love Is	Tom	
2007	Daddy Day Camp	Charlie Hinton	
2007	American Gangster	Nicky Barnes	
2007	The Land Before Time XIII: The Wisdom of Friends	Loofah The Beipiaosaurus	Voice role; direct-to-video
2008	Hero Wanted	Liam Case	Direct-to-video
2008	Harold	Cromer	Also producer
2008	Linewatch	Michael Dixon	Direct-to-video
2009	The Way of War	David Wolfe	Direct-to-video
2009	The Devil's Tomb	Captain Mack	Direct-to-video
2009	Lies & Illusions	Isaac	Direct-to-video
2009	Hardwired	Luke Gibson	Direct-to-video
2009	Wrong Turn at Tahoe	Joshua	Direct-to-video
2011	Ticking Clock	Lewis Hicks	Direct-to-video
2011	Sacrifice	Detective John Hebron	Direct-to-video
2011	The Hit List	Jonas Arbor	Direct-to-video
2012	Red Tails	Major Emanuel Stance	
2012	One in the Chamber	Ray Carver	Direct-to-video
2013	Don Jon	Hollywood Actor #2	Cameo
2013	Absolute Deception	John Nelson	Direct-to-video
2013	Life of a King	Eugene Brown	
2013	The Butler	Carter Wilson	
2013	Machete Kills	El Chameleón 2	
2014	Freedom	Samuel	Also executive producer
2014	Selma	Fred Gray	
2018	Bayou Caviar	Rodney Jones	Also director and co-writer
2020	Life in a Year	Xavier	Direct-to-streaming after limited theatrical release
2023	The Weapon	"Blue"	Direct-to-streaming after limited theatrical release
2024	Skeletons in the Closet	Andres	Direct-to-streaming after limited theatrical release
2024	Angels Fallen: Warriors of Peace	Balthazar	Direct-to-streaming
2024	The Firing Squad	Samuel Wilson	
2025	A Line of Fire	Javier	
TBD	Dog Patrol	Sheriff Jacobs	In post-production
TBD	Lotus		In pre-production

=== Television ===
Year	Title	Role	Notes
1986	Better Days	Bully	Episode: "Wooly Bully"
1986	The Dating Game	Himself / Contestant	IDK
1987	Hill Street Blues	Gang member #2 / Ethan Dillon	2 episodes
1988	CBS Schoolbreak Special	Paul	Episode: "No Means No"
1988	Amen	Kenny	Episode: "Thelma's Handyman"
1989–1991	MacGyver	Billy Colton	4 episodes
1992	Murder Without Motive: The Edmund Perry Story	Tyree	TV film
1993	Daybreak	Stephen "Torch" Tolkin	TV film
1993	The Untouchables	Tommy Taylor	Episode: "Betrayal in Black & Tan"
1995	The Tuskegee Airmen	Billy Roberts	TV film
1999	Saturday Night Live	Himself	Host; episode: "Cuba Gooding Jr./Ricky Martin"
2007	Sesame Street	Himself	2 episodes
2009	Gifted Hands: The Ben Carson Story	Ben Carson	TV film
2012	Firelight	Dwayne Johnson (DJ)	TV film
2012	Guilty	Billy Remz	Pilot
2013	Summoned	Detective Callendar	TV film
2015	Empire	Dwayne "Puma" Robinson	Episode: "The Devil Quotes Scripture"
2015	The Book of Negroes	Samuel Fraunces	2 episodes
2015	Big Time in Hollywood, FL	Himself	6 episodes
2015	Forever	Isaac Monroe	3 episodes
2016	American Crime Story: The People v. O. J. Simpson	O. J. Simpson	Miniseries; 10 episodes
2016	American Horror Story: Roanoke	Matt Miller / Dominic Banks	5 episodes
2016	Oxford Street 24/7	Himself	1 episode

=== Theater ===
Year	Title	Role	Venue	Ref.
2013	The Trip to Bountiful	Ludie Watts	Stephen Sondheim Theatre, Broadway debut	
2018	Chicago	Billy Flynn	Phoenix Theatre, West End debut	
2018	Chicago	Billy Flynn	Ambassador Theatre, Broadway	

=== Video games ===
Year	Title	Role	Notes
2002	Quest for the Code	Cyrus	Live-action

== Awards and nominations ==
Year	Association	Category	Project	Result	Ref.
1991	Chicago Film Critics Association	Best Supporting Actor	Boyz n the Hood	Nominated	
1995	NAACP Image Award	Outstanding Actor in Television	The Tuskegee Airmen	Nominated	
1995	NAACP Image Award	Outstanding Supporting Actor in a Motion Picture	Outbreak	Nominated	
1996	Academy Award	Best Supporting Actor	Jerry Maguire	Won	
1996	American Comedy Awards	Funniest Supporting Actor in a Motion Picture	Jerry Maguire	Won	
1996	Broadcast Film Critics Association	Best Supporting Actor	Jerry Maguire	Won	
1996	Chicago Film Critics Association	Best Supporting Actor	Jerry Maguire	Won	
1996	Golden Globe Award	Best Supporting Actor - Motion Picture	Jerry Maguire	Nominated	
1996	NAACP Image Award	Outstanding Lead Actor in a Motion Picture	Jerry Maguire	Nominated	
1996	Satellite Award	Best Supporting Actor - Motion Picture	Jerry Maguire	Won	
1996	Actor Award	Outstanding Actor in a Supporting Role	Jerry Maguire	Won	
1997	Satellite Award	Best Supporting Actor - Motion Picture	As Good as It Gets	Nominated	
1998	NAACP Image Award	Outstanding Supporting Actor in a Motion Picture	What Dreams May Come	Nominated	
2000	BET Award	Best Actor	Men of Honor	Nominated	
2000	Black Reel Award	Best Actor	Men of Honor	Nominated	
2000	NAACP Image Award	Outstanding Actor in a Motion Picture	Men of Honor	Nominated	
2003	Razzie Award	Worst Actor	Boat Trip	Nominated	
2003	Razzie Award	Worst Actor	The Fighting Temptations	Nominated	
2003	Razzie Award	Worst Actor	Radio	Nominated	
2004	NAACP Image Award	Outstanding Actor in a Motion Picture	Radio	Won	
2007	Razzie Award	Worst Actor	Norbit	Nominated	
2007	Razzie Award	Worst Actor	Daddy Day Camp	Nominated	
2007	Actor Award	Outstanding Cast in a Motion Picture	American Gangster	Nominated	
2009	Actor Award	Outstanding Actor in a Miniseries or Television Movie	Gifted Hands: The Ben Carson Story	Nominated	
2009	NAACP Image Award	Outstanding Actor in a Television Movie, Miniseries or Special	Gifted Hands: The Ben Carson Story	Won	
2012	NAACP Image Award	Outstanding Actor in a Television Movie, Miniseries or Special	Firelight	Won	
2013	NAACP Image Award	Outstanding Supporting Actor in a Motion Picture	The Butler	Nominated	
2013	Actor Award	Outstanding Cast in a Motion Picture	The Butler	Nominated	
2016	Primetime Emmy Award	Outstanding Lead Actor in a Limited Series or Movie	American Crime Story: The People v. O. J. Simpson	Nominated	
2016	Critics' Choice Television Award	Best Actor in a Movie/Limited Series	American Crime Story: The People v. O. J. Simpson	Nominated	
2016	Satellite Award	Best Actor in a Miniseries or Television Movie	American Crime Story: The People v. O. J. Simpson	Nominated	
2016	NAACP Image Award	Outstanding Actor in a Television Movie, Miniseries or Special	American Crime Story: The People v. O. J. Simpson	Nominated	
2024	Septimius Awards	Lifetime Achievement Award		Won	

== See also ==
- List of actors with Academy Award nominations
- List of black Academy Award winners and nominees
- List of black Golden Globe Award winners and nominees
- List of oldest and youngest Academy Award winners and nominees — Youngest winners for Best Supporting Actor
