= Anderson Independent-Mail =

American newspaper

- Type: Daily newspaper
- Format: Broadsheet
- Owner: USA Today Co.
- Publisher: Susan Kelly-Gilbert
- Editor: Stephen S. Mullins
- Founded: 1899; 127 years ago
- Language: English
- Headquarters: 1000 Williamston Rd. Anderson, SC 29621; United States
- Country: United States
- Website: independentmail.com

The Anderson Independent-Mail, marketed as Independent Mail and sometimes referred to as Anderson Independent Mail, is a newspaper for Anderson County in the state of South Carolina. It is owned by Gannett Satellite Information Network, LLC. It is the closest daily newspaper to Clemson University, the newspaper's sports department heavily covers the sports of the Clemson Tigers.

== History ==
George Pierce Browne founded the precursor afternoon newspaper the Anderson Daily Mail in 1899. Wilton E. Hall, publisher of the Morning Anderson Independent, bought the Anderson Daily Mail and published both newspapers for more than four decades. The two papers were purchased by Harte-Hanks Communications in 1972 and combined as the Anderson Independent-Mail. In 1997, The E. W. Scripps Company bought the newspaper.

Scripps spun out its newspaper assets into Journal Media Group in April 2015. In 2016, Gannett acquired all 15 daily JMG newspapers, including the Independent Mail.
