= Vincent Sheheen =

American politician

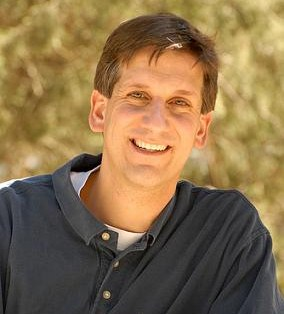

Mayor of Camden
- Incumbent
- Assumed office December 10, 2024
- Preceded by: Alfred Drakeford

Member of the South Carolina Senate from the 27th district
- In office February 4, 2004 – November 9, 2020
- Preceded by: Donald Holland
- Succeeded by: Penry Gustafson

Member of the South Carolina House of Representatives from the 52nd district
- In office November 28, 2000 – February 4, 2004
- Preceded by: Robert Sheheen
- Succeeded by: Laurie Funderburk

Personal details
- Born: Vincent Austin Sheheen; April 29, 1971 (age 55) Camden, South Carolina, U.S.
- Party: Democratic
- Spouse: Amy Renee (m. 1995)
- Children: 3
- Relatives: Robert Sheheen (uncle)
- Education: Clemson University (BA); University of South Carolina, Columbia (JD)
- Website: Official website

Vincent Austin Sheheen (born April 29, 1971) is an American attorney and politician. He was a member of the South Carolina Senate from 2004 to 2020, representing the 27th District, which comprises Chesterfield, Kershaw, and Lancaster counties. He currently serves as the mayor of Camden, South Carolina. He is a member of the Democratic Party. He was a member of the South Carolina House of Representatives from 2001 to 2004. He ran for Governor of South Carolina twice, in 2010 and 2014, losing both times to Nikki Haley. In 2020, Sheheen lost reelection to Republican Penry Gustafson.

Sheheen, who is of Lebanese descent, is currently on the board of trustees for In Defense of Christians (IDC), a nonprofit advocating for the rights of Christians in the Middle East.

== Background ==
Vincent Sheheen was born and raised in Camden, South Carolina. His father, Fred Sheheen, was the former executive director of the South Carolina Commission on Higher Education. His mother is Italian. His uncle Robert Sheheen was the former Speaker of the South Carolina House of Representatives, becoming the first Lebanese speaker of the house in 1986. His great-grandfather Abraham Sheheen immigrated to the U.S. from Lebanon, and his great-grandmother was also Lebanese.

Sheheen received a bachelor's degree from Clemson University, where he met his wife, Amy. Later he attended law school at the University of South Carolina. They have three sons, Anthony and twins Austin and Joseph. Sheheen served as a city prosecutor before being elected to public office and was named, "Legislator of the Year" by the South Carolina Solicitor's Association for his work on behalf of law enforcement.

Sheheen is currently an adjunct instructor at the University of South Carolina Honors College, and has taught at the University's School of Law and at the Francis Marion University Non-Profit Institute.

== Political career ==
=== South Carolina legislature ===
While serving in the South Carolina House of Representatives, Sheheen worked to create a conservation land bank that has preserved thousands of acres in South Carolina. After Republican Governor Mark Sanford announced that he would reject stimulus money for South Carolina, Sheheen helped lead an effort in the South Carolina Senate to bypass the governor and claim about $700 million in stimulus funds.

Sheheen is the author of the book The Right Way: Getting the Palmetto State Back on Track.

=== Candidacies for Governor of South Carolina ===
==== 2010 ====
Sheheen announced his intention to run for governor of South Carolina with the Democratic party on February 6, 2009. On June 8, 2010, Sheheen won the primary over State Superintendent Jim Rex, and was the party's nominee for governor in the November general election. He lost in the general election to the Republican party's nominee, State Representative Nikki Haley, by a margin 51% to 47%.

==== 2014 ====
Sheheen announced his intention for a second run for governor in 2014.

He lost to Haley again in 2014, as she won 55 percent of the vote to his 41 percent.

=== 2024 Mayoral Race ===
In April 2024, Sheheen announced that he would run for Mayor of Camden. In November 2024, Sheheen was elected Mayor of Camden, South Carolina.

== Honors and recognitions ==
Honors to Sheheen include:

Legislator of Year; National Alliance on Mental Health Illness, 2017

Legislator of Year; S.C. African American History Comm., 2017

12 State Legislators to Watch; Governing Magazine, 2012

Green Tie Award; Conservation Voters of S.C., 2011

== Political positions ==
=== Retiring the Confederate flag ===
In 2014, Sheheen spent months touring the state and speaking to thousands of citizens. Because of the growing divide he saw and experienced, Sheheen made retiring of the Flag from the State House grounds a centerpiece of his campaign for governor. Not long thereafter, Sheheen's seatmate in the Senate, Pastor Clementa Pinckney, was murdered in the Charleston massacre by a Confederate flag-wielding white supremacist. Although mourning the death of his friend, Sheheen quickly renewed his call for removal of the flag pushing other leaders in the state to do the same. Sheheen was responsible for drafting and introducing the legislation that removed the flag and spent weeks planning, cajoling, and creating the legislative plan that gained the necessary votes to remove the flag. The Confederate flag was retired from the State House grounds on July 10, 2015.

=== Government restructuring ===
For years, leaders and commentators had complained about South Carolina's antiquated state government structure. The chief complaint was the lodging of power in the legislatively controlled Budget and Control Board. The reality, however, was that state government operations were too often not adequately controlled by either the legislative or executive branches. Executive functions such as building and fleet management and I.T. were controlled by committee, and legislative oversight of state agencies did not exist. Change had been stymied by turf battles between governors and legislative leaders. Sheheen saw that improving government did not have to be a zero-sum game, so he introduced the Government Restructuring Act of 2014. The Act created a Department of Administration run by the Governor's appointee to handle truly administrative tasks. It abolished the Budget and Control Board and created a system of legislative oversight, ensuring that state agency operations will be reviewed by legislative committees to guard against mission creep, incompetence, and scandal. Sheheen worked tirelessly to bring Republican and Democratic leaders together to pass his Restructuring Act, and it became law in February 2014.

=== Bringing accountability to operations ===
For years, leaders in South Carolina faced accusations of "waste, fraud, and abuse" in state government. But little was done on an organizational level to confront these problems. Sheheen introduced legislation to create a South Carolina Inspector General's Office. Working with Republican and Democratic co-sponsors and allies, the bill became law in 2012, and the Office of Inspector General has investigated and brought to light scores of problems in state government during the last seven years.

== Electoral history ==
=== State Senate ===
| Date | Position | Status | Opponent | Result | Vote share | Opponent vote share |
|---|---|---|---|---|---|---|
| 2004 | SC State Senator | Open seat | Steve Kelly(R) | Elected | 56% | 44% |
| 2008 | SC State Senator | Incumbent | Unopposed | Re-elected | 100% | N/A |
| 2012 | SC State Senator | Incumbent | Unopposed | Re-elected | 100% | N/A |
| 2016 | SC State Senator | Incumbent | Unopposed | Re-elected | 100% | N/A |
| 2020 | SC State Senator | Incumbent | Penry Gustafson (R) | Defeated | 49% | 51% |

=== 2010 South Carolina Gubernatorial election ===
Results
| Party | Candidate | Votes | % | ±% |
|---|---|---|---|---|
| Republican | Nikki Haley | 690,525 | 51.37% | −3.75% |
| Democratic | Vincent Sheheen | 630,534 | 46.91% | +2.12% |
| United Citizens | Morgan B. Reeves | 20,114 | 1.50% | |
| Write-ins | | 3,025 | 0.23% | |
| Majority | | 59,991 | 4.46% | −5.87% |
| Turnout | | 1,344,198 | 50.92% | +6.42% |
| Republican hold | | Swing | | |

=== 2014 South Carolina Gubernatorial election ===
Results
| Party | Candidate | Votes | % | ±% |
|---|---|---|---|---|
| Republican | Nikki Haley (incumbent) | 696,645 | 55.90% | +4.53% |
| Democratic | Vincent Sheheen | 516,166 | 41.42% | −5.49% |
| Libertarian | Steve French | 15,438 | 1.24% | N/A |
| Independent | Tom Ervin | 11,496 | 0.92% | N/A |
| United Citizens | Morgan B. Reeves | 5,622 | 0.45% | −1.05% |
| n/a | Write-ins | 934 | 0.07% | −0.16% |
| Total votes | | 1,246,301 | 100.0% | N/A |
| Republican hold | | | | |

== Post-political activity ==
In 2021, Sheheen teamed up with former Democratic Senator Joel Lourie to produce the Bourbon in the Backroom podcast.

In 2023, Sheheen was named Advocate of the Year by the South Carolina Appleseed Legal Justice Center.

In 2025, Sheheen published "The Concise Guide to South Carolina State Government", with the University of South Carolina Press and Parker Poe Adams & Bernstein Law Firm. (ISBN 978-1-64336-643-2)

Party political offices
| Preceded by Tommy Moore | Democratic nominee for Governor of South Carolina; 2010, 2014 | Succeeded by James Smith |
