= J. Clator Arrants =

American politician

James Clator Arrants was a politician from South Carolina. He served in the South Carolina House of Representatives, the U.S. Navy, returned to the state house, served in the South Carolina Senate, and was appointed a family court judge.

He was from Kershaw, South Carolina. He served in the state senate from 1951 until 1954.

He ran for lieutenant governor in 1954 and attacked his Democratic Party primary opponent Ernest F. Hollings as an integrationist. Hollings went on to win with two-thirds of the vote.

In 1966, he was chosen to chair a joint House-Senate committee formed to study state election laws. He served in the House until at least 1968.

He died in 1989.
