= Westside High School (South Carolina) =

Coordinates: 34.5176056°N 82.6906903°W

Location
- 806 Pearman Dairy Road; Anderson, South Carolina 29625; United States

Information
- Type: Public high school
- Established: 1951 (75 years ago)
- School district: Anderson School District Five
- CEEB code: 410055
- Principal
- Staff: 99.92 (FTE)
- Enrollment: 1,714 (2023–2024)
- Student to teacher ratio: 17.15
- Colors: Maroon and grey
- Nickname: Rams
- Website: westside.anderson5.net

Westside High School is a high school located in Anderson, South Carolina, United States. It serves the west side of Anderson and is one of two high schools in Anderson School District Five.

Westside High School is administered by Head Principal Kory Roberts, the third head principal in the school's history. Mr. Roberts took over for long-serving principal Henry Adair in 2014.

This school uses the slogans "The Westside Way", "It's a Matter of Pride", and "Westside Is My Side".

== Athletics ==
=== State championships ===
- Basketball - Boys: 1971
- Basketball - Girls: 1989, 1991, 1992, 2021, 2022
- Football: 1969, 2023

== Notable alumni ==
- Terence Roberts (1978), first African-American mayor of Anderson, South Carolina
- Shaun Ellis (1995), former defensive end for the New York Jets
