= Anderson School District Five =

School district in South Carolina, United States

Coordinates: 34°30′42″N 82°41′14″W

Address
- 400 Pearman Dairy Road Anderson, South Carolina, 29625; United States

District information
- Type: Public
- Grades: PreK–12
- Superintendent: Brenda S. Kelley
- NCES District ID: 4500900

Students and staff
- Students: 12,771
- Teachers: 866.89
- Staff: 952.28
- Student–teacher ratio: 14.73

Other information
- Website: www.anderson5.net

Anderson School District Five is a public school district headquartered in Anderson, South Carolina, United States. The school district, led by Superintendent Brenda Kelley, serves 12,560 students across 112 square miles. The district operates 18 schools (one early childhood, 11 elementary schools, four middle schools, and two high schools). The district also operates the Anderson Institute of Technology, along with Anderson School Districts Three and Four.

== Schools ==
=== Elementary schools ===
Name	Grades	Enrollment	Principal	Address	Website
Calhoun Academy of the Arts	PK-5th	473	Tonna Marroni	1520 E. Calhoun St. Anderson, SC 29621	link
Centerville Elementary School	PK-5th	620	Jennifer Seymour	1529 Whitehall Road Anderson, SC 29625	link
Concord Elementary School	PK-5th	596	Gary Bruhjell	2701 Calrossie Road Anderson, SC 29621	link
Homeland Park Primary School	PK-2nd	427	Elizabeth Bowen	3519 Wilmont Street Anderson, SC 29624	link
McLees Elementary School	PK-5th	592	Janet T Mills	4900 Dobbins Bridge Road Anderson, SC 29626	link
Midway Elementary School	PK-5th	699	Brandon Meares	1221 Harriet Circle Anderson, SC 29621	link
Nevitt Forest Elementary School	PK-5th	577	Angela Rardon	1401 Bolt Drive Anderson, SC 29621	link
New Prospect Elementary School	PK-5th	464	Malura Shady	126 New Prospect Church Rd Anderson, SC 29625	link
North Pointe Elementary School	PK-5th	492	Jill Brackett	3325 Highway 81N Anderson, SC 29621	link
Varennes Elementary School	3rd-5th	370	Danessa Barr	1820 U.S. 29 Business Anderson, SC 29626	link
Whitehall Elementary School	PK-5th	534	Jennifer Bufford	702 Whitehall Rd. Anderson, SC 29625	link

=== Middle schools ===
Name	Grades	Enrollment	Principal	Address	Website
Robert Anderson Middle School	6th-8th	1131	Micheal Noble	2302 Dobbins Bridge Rd. Anderson, SC 29626	link
Glenview Middle School	6th-8th	733	Ryan Roberts	2575 Old Williamston Road Anderson, SC 29621	link
McCants Middle School	6th-8th	563	Stephanie Radford	2123 Marchbanks Avenue Anderson, SC 29621	link
Southwood Academy of the Arts	6th-8th	394	James A. Smith	1110 Southwood St. Anderson, SC 29624	link

=== High schools ===
Name	Grades	Enrollment	Principal	Address	Website
T.L Hanna High School	9th-12th	1910	Walter A. Mayfield	2600 N Highway 81 Anderson, SC 29621	link
Westside High School	9th-12th	1768	Kory Roberts	806 Pearman Dairy Road Anderson, SC 29625	link
