= WABB =

Coordinates: 34°35′19″N 82°32′17″W

- Belton, South Carolina; United States
- Broadcast area: Anderson, South Carolina
- Frequency: 1390 kHz
- Branding: The Life FM

Programming
- Format: Southern Gospel
- Affiliations: The Life FM

Ownership
- Owner: The Power Foundation
- Sister stations: WHQA, WHQB

History
- First air date: October 1956
- Former call signs: WHPB (1956–2004); WLUA (2004–2008); WROP (2008–2012)

Technical information
- Licensing authority: FCC
- Facility ID: 10076
- Class: D
- Power: 1,000 watts (day); 17 watts (night)
- Translators: W286DD (105.1 MHz, Anderson)

Links
- Public license information: Public file; LMS
- Webcast: Listen Live
- Website: http://www.thelifefm.com/

WABB is an American radio station located in Belton, South Carolina, The station is licensed by the Federal Communications Commission (FCC) to broadcast on 1390 AM with a transmitter power of 1,000 watts during the day and 17 watts at night under a non-directional pattern. The station airs a Christian format with Southern gospel music as an affiliate of The Life FM.

== History ==
Prior to its acquisition by Big Fish Broadcasting in 2008, the station carried a religious radio format with the WLUA callsign. Starting in early 2008, it began simulcasting sister station WYOR, "Your 94" and its Variety Hits format.

The station adopted the WABB call sign on November 9, 2012, after it was dropped from WTKD in Mobile, Alabama.

Due to technical problems, this station has operated only briefly from May 2012 until December 17, 2013.

The station was acquired from Big Fish Broadcasting by The Power Foundation in a transaction that was consummated on April 22, 2014, at a purchase price of $100,000.

== History of call letters ==
The call letters WABB were previously assigned to an AM station in Mobile, Alabama. It began broadcasting June 19, 1948, on 1480 kHz with 5 kW power. A Mutual affiliate, it was owned and operated by the Mobile Press Register, along with its sister station, WABB-FM.

== Translator ==
Call sign	Frequency	City of license	FID	ERP (W)	HAAT	FCC info
W286DD	105.1 FM	Anderson, SC	200692	250	58 m (190 ft)	LMS
