= KVMK =

Radio station in Wheelock, Texas, United States

- Wheelock, Texas; United States
- Broadcast area: Bryan-College Station
- Frequency: 100.9 MHz
- Branding: Maverick 100.9

Programming
- Format: Texas and red dirt country

Ownership
- Owner: Bryan Broadcasting Corporation; (Bryan Broadcasting License Corporation)
- Sister stations: WTAW, WTAW-FM, KPWJ, KKEE, KWBC, KAGC, KNDE, KJCS

History
- First air date: February 12, 2015
- Former call signs: KKEE (2012–2014; CP)
- Call sign meaning: "Maverick"

Technical information
- Licensing authority: FCC
- Facility ID: 189519
- Class: A
- ERP: 4,400 watts
- HAAT: 116.4 meters (382 ft)
- Transmitter coordinates: 30°53′10.50″N 96°20′20.40″W

Links
- Public license information: Public file; LMS
- Website: maverickradio.com

KVMK (100.9 FM) is a commercial radio station, licensed to Wheelock, Texas, United States, and is owned by Bryan Broadcasting Corporation. The format is known as Maverick 100.9.
