= KJCS =

- Nacogdoches, Texas; United States
- Broadcast area: Lufkin-Nacogdoches
- Frequency: 103.3 MHz
- Branding: Willy 103.3

Programming
- Format: Classic country

Ownership
- Owner: Ben Downs; (Bryan Broadcasting Corporation)
- Sister stations: WTAW, KNDE, KZNE, KWBC, KAGC, WTAW-FM, KPWJ, KKEE

History
- First air date: August 23, 1967 (as KEEE-FM); December 24, 1973 (as KJCS)
- Former call signs: KEEE-FM (1967–1968); KEFM (1968–1973)
- Call sign meaning: J.C. Stallings (name of original owner)

Technical information
- Licensing authority: FCC
- Facility ID: 67856
- Class: C2
- ERP: 22,500 watts
- HAAT: 224 meters (735 ft)
- Transmitter coordinates: 31°25′59.7″N 94°49′3.8″W

Links
- Public license information: Public file; LMS
- Webcast: Listen Live
- Website: willy1033.com

KJCS (103.3 MHz) is an FM radio station broadcasting a classic country music format, featuring songs that charted from the decades of the 1960s through the 1990s. Licensed to Nacogdoches, Texas, United States, the station serves the Lufkin-Nacogdoches area. The station is currently owned by Ben Downs, through licensee Bryan Broadcasting Corporation. KJCS is Bryan Broadcasting's entry into the Lufkin-Nacogdoches area, having purchased the station from Carolyn Vance, through Radio Licensing, Inc.

== History ==
KJCS was first proposed by J.C. Stallings in October 1966. The requested application called for the facility to operate at 51 kilowatts ERP, with an elevation of 360 meters height above average terrain, from a transmission site 1.5 miles south of the City courthouse in Nacogdoches. The facility received the initial call sign of KEEE-FM on January 3, 1967, as it was at the time the sister to 1230 KEEE in Nacogdoches. The facility was built and received a License to Cover on August 23, 1967. KEEE-FM's original studio location is 300 East Main Street. B.C. Barbee of Nacogdoches was the engineer of record for the construction of KEEE-FM.

KEEE-FM would change call sign to KEFM on October 17, 1968.

On October 23, 1973, an involuntary transfer of license was filed with the FCC to change the licensee of the facility to Evelyn Stallings, after the death of her husband J.C. Stallings. In honor of J.C., on Christmas Eve 1973, the call sign of the station was changed to the current KJCS.

The station was sold by Evelyn Streetman (née Stallings) to R&H Broadcasting on August 25, 1982.

KJCS was owned by Carolyn G. Vance from 1987 to 2023 through Tricom Broadcasting and then licensing company, Radio Licensing, Inc. of Lufkin. It was branded as The Country Authority, KJ 103 and then The Best Country Station, 103 the Bull during her ownership. Vance was the former owner of KORA-FM in Bryan-College Station, Texas from 1972 to 1987.

KJCS was purchased by Bryan Broadcasting in early 2023, and has re-branded the station as Willy 103-3, and plays a classic country format.
