= WTAW =

WTAW may refer to:

- WTAW (AM), a radio station (1620 AM) licensed to serve College Station, Texas, United States
- WTAW-FM, a radio station (103.5 FM) licensed to serve Buffalo, Texas
- KZNE, a radio station (1150 AM) licensed to serve College Station, Texas, which held the call sign WTAW from 1922 to 2000
