= KAGC =

- Bryan, Texas; United States
- Broadcast area: Brazos Valley
- Frequency: 1510 kHz
- Branding: Magic 97.3

Programming
- Format: Urban adult contemporary
- Affiliations: Premiere Networks

Ownership
- Owner: Bryan Broadcasting Corporation; (Bryan Broadcasting License Corporation)
- Sister stations: KWBC, WTAW, KPWJ, KKEE, WTAW-FM, KNDE, KZNE, KVMK

History
- First air date: April 27, 1978
- Call sign meaning: "Aggie Country"

Technical information
- Licensing authority: FCC
- Facility ID: 16983
- Class: D
- Power: 500 watts (daytime only)
- Transmitter coordinates: 1510: 30°39′9″N 96°23′6″W; 97.3: 30°41′15.50″N 96°25′31.50″W
- Translator: 97.3 K247CS (Bryan)

Links
- Public license information: Public file; LMS
- Webcast: Listen live
- Website: mymagic973.com

KAGC (1510 AM, 97.3 FM) is an American terrestrial radio station, paired with an FM relay translator, broadcasting an urban adult contemporary format. Licensed to Bryan, Texas, United States, the station serves the Bryan-College Station area. The station is owned by Bryan Broadcasting Corporation through its licensee Bryan Broadcasting License Corporation. The station's studios are located in College Station and its transmitter is in Bryan.

1510 AM is a United States clear-channel frequency, on which WLAC in Nashville, Tennessee, is the dominant Class A station.

== History ==
KAGC was initially proposed by Brazos Metro Inc. in December 1975. A construction permit was granted to build a 250 watt, Class D daytime facility, from a combined transmission and studio site at 1704 Paris St. in Bryan, on July 12, 1977. The facility was issued the callsign KAGC on September 26, 1977.

The studio location for KAGC was modified to 1710 South Texas Avenue in Bryan on October 21, 1977, with the transmission site remaining at 1704 Paris St., operated remotely from the studio.

The facility was constructed to specifications, and issued a License to Cover on April 27, 1978. Guy C. Hutcheson served as Engineer. In October 1978, KAGC's license was voluntarily transferred to Brazos Media, Inc.

KAGC increased power to the current 500 watts in June 1979.

Bryan Broadcasting Corporation purchased KAGC from Bob and Judith Bell, dba Divcon Associates, Inc. on April 6, 2006.

On January 2, 2025, at noon, KAGC changed their format from gospel to urban adult contemporary, branded as "Magic 97.3".
