= W253BG =

- Arial, South Carolina; United States
- Broadcast area: Upstate South Carolina
- Frequency: 98.5 MHz
- Branding: X98.5

Programming
- Format: Alternative rock

Ownership
- Owner: Tower Above Media; (Tower Above Media LLC)
- Operator: SummitMedia

History
- First air date: March 27, 2007

Technical information
- Licensing authority: FCC
- Facility ID: 156113
- Class: D
- ERP: 250 watts
- Transmitter coordinates: 34.9352°N 82.4051°W
- Repeater: 107.3-2 WJMZ-HD2

Links
- Public license information: Public file; LMS
- Webcast: Listen Live
- Website: x985fm.com

W253BG (98.5 FM) is an alternative rock radio station located in Arial, South Carolina area. Although licensed as a broadcast translator prohibited from carrying its own programming, it broadcasts under a legal loophole allowed by the Federal Communications Commission, by simulcasting on HD Radio channel 2 of WJMZ FM 107.3, allowing such stations to sidestep the restriction on translators, as well as regulations regarding the excessive concentration of media ownership by a single company in a given media market.

== History ==
98.5 FM began broadcasting in March 2007 in Arial, re-broadcasting WHRZ-LP in Spartanburg, which carries a Christian Contemporary format. In June 2012, an application was filed to move the station to Paris Mountain in Greenville, with a downgrade from 250 to 200 watts, however allowing the station to cover Greenville County, as well as portions of neighboring Pickens and Spartanburg counties with a solid signal. The station would also re-broadcast Cox Radio's WJMZ-FM's HD2 signal. The station's new tower also houses sister station W258CB, 99.5 Chuck FM.

In early July 2012, shortly after the construction permit was granted, a website linked to Cox surfaced that indicated that "Talk 98.5" would launch, with a countdown to "something to talk about" on August 6 featured on the homepage. On Sunday, August 5, the station went live, running a loop of The Neal Boortz Show from sister station WSB. The following day, at 11am, a local talk show came on the air, referring to "Talk 98.5." Shortly after noon, after playing a montage of sound clips, the true format was launched as X-98.5, "The Upstate's New Rock Alternative." The first song heard on X-98.5 was We Are Young by Fun.

On July 20, 2012, Cox Radio, Inc. announced the sale of W253BG and 22 other stations to SummitMedia for $66.25 million. The sale was consummated on May 3, 2013.

The station registered websites in September 2013, referring to a format change to a gospel format as 98.5 Praise, Gospel 98.5, Praise 98, or Praise 98.5. However, this format change never took place. In June 2014, rumors began to spread that W253BG would flip to a simulcast of WRTH as 98.5/103.3 Earth FM, but that rumor never came to fruition.
