= WTAW-FM =

- Buffalo, Texas; United States
- Broadcast area: Leon and Freestone Counties
- Frequency: 103.5 MHz
- Branding: "Willy 103.5"

Programming
- Format: Classic Country
- Affiliations: Premiere Networks

Ownership
- Owner: Bryan Broadcasting Corporation; (Bryan Broadcasting License Corporation)
- Sister stations: WTAW, KZNE, KNDE, KAGC, KWBC, KPWJ, KKEE, KVMK, KJCS

History
- First air date: June 17, 2015
- Call sign meaning: "Watch The Aggies Win" (taken from sister station WTAW)

Technical information
- Licensing authority: FCC
- Facility ID: 190405
- Class: A
- ERP: 6,000 watts
- HAAT: 86.9 meters (285 ft)
- Transmitter coordinates: 31°21′42.00″N 95°58′15.00″W

Links
- Public license information: Public file; LMS
- Webcast: Listen live
- Website: willy1035.com

WTAW-FM (103.5 FM, "Willy 103.5") is a commercial radio station broadcasting a classic country radio format. Licensed to Buffalo, Texas, it serves Leon and Freestone Counties, along the Interstate 45 corridor, between Houston and Dallas. It carries the nationally syndicated morning show, Murphy, Sam and Jodi. The station is owned by Bryan Broadcasting Corporation with studios and offices in College Station, Texas.

WTAW-FM has an effective radiated power (ERP) of 6,000 watts, its transmitter is near Moore Lake, off Texas State Highway 75 in Centerville.

== History ==
Bryan Broadcasting Corporation received a construction permit from the Federal Communications Commission (FCC) to build a Class A radio station in Buffalo on June 21, 2012. The station received its license to cover on June 17, 2015, and signed on the air. It chose the call sign shared with its sister station WTAW, becoming WTAW-FM. While most stations in Texas have call letters beginning with a "K," the WTAW call sign dates back to the early 1920s, when Texas radio stations were assigned "W" call letters.

WTAW-FM uses the moniker Willy 103.5 to identify with country music legend Willie Nelson and other stars of his era. The station plays classic country hits, including Nelson's biggest sellers. In addition to the regular programming, "Willy 103.5" also features Bisons boys and girls varsity sports from Buffalo High School.
