= KZNE =

Radio station in College Station, Texas

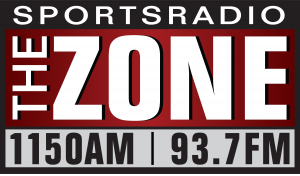
- College Station, Texas; United States
- Broadcast area: Brazos Valley
- Frequency: 1150 kHz
- Branding: The Zone 1150 AM & 93.7 FM

Programming
- Format: Sports
- Affiliations: ESPN Radio; Houston Astros Radio Network; Houston Texans Radio Network; Westwood One Sports

Ownership
- Owner: Bryan Broadcasting Corporation; (Bryan Broadcasting License Corporation)
- Sister stations: KAGC, KNDE, KWBC, WTAW, WTAW-FM, KPWJ, KKEE, KJCS

History
- First air date: October 7, 1922; 103 years ago (as WTAW at 833 kHz)
- Former call signs: WTAW (1922–2000)
- Call sign meaning: K ZoNE (current branding)

Technical information
- Licensing authority: FCC
- Facility ID: 7632
- Class: B
- Power: 1,000 watts day 500 watts night
- Transmitter coordinates: 30°38′05″N 96°21′20″W
- Translator: 93.7 K229DK (College Station)

Links
- Public license information: Public file; LMS
- Webcast: Listen Live
- Website: zone1150.com

KZNE (1150 AM), branded as "The Zone 1150 AM – 93.7 FM", is a commercial sports radio station licensed to serve College Station, Texas. Owned by the Bryan Broadcasting Company, KZNE covers College Station, Bryan and much of the Brazos Valley. Studios are located in College Station, with a transmitter site in Bryan.

In addition to a standard analog transmission, KZNE is simulcast over low-power FM translator K229DK (93.7 FM) College Station, and is available online.

== Programming ==
Local programs on KZNE include TexAgs Radio, The Louie Belina Show, and Chip Howard Sports Talk. The station is also an affiliate for CBS Sports Radio and Paul Finebaum., and the flagship station for Texas A&M University athletic events.

== History ==
=== Experimental activities ===
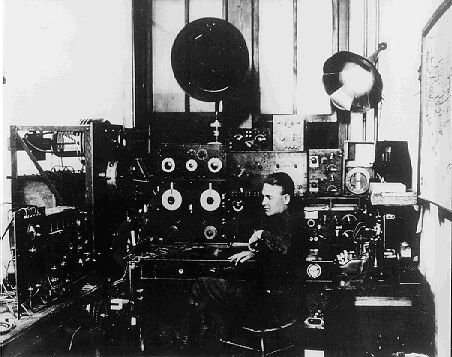
W. A. Tolson, chief operator of 5XB

In the United States, civilian radio stations were banned during World War I, but began to be reauthorized after the end of the conflict. In the summer of 1919 the Agricultural & Mechanical College in College Station, Texas (now Texas A&M University) received a license for a "Technical and Training School" station, with the call sign 5YA. The next year a second Technical and Training School authorization was reported, with the call sign 5YF. That same year an Experimental station license was issued, with the call sign 5XB.

In November 1921, W. A. Tolson, Chief Operator at 5XB, arranged with local amateurs to broadcast a play-by-play accounting of the season-ending Texas A&M-University of Texas Thanksgiving football game, that was being played at College Station. This was not the first radio broadcast of a football game, as earlier broadcasts in other localities date back to at least November 1919, but it was new for the area.

Tolson produced advance publicity for the broadcast. For the event, wires were run from the Kyle Field press box to the station in the Electrical Engineering building located a half-mile (800 meters) or so away. For reception, other wires were run to the home of a radio amateur who lived near the playing field. This arrangement enabled the operator to hear his own transmissions as well as those from amateur stations should their operators wish to interrupt for clarification or other information. The only radio equipment at the press box was a key for transmitting and a pair of headphones for receiving. The transmission was made using Morse Code, so to save time a special group of abbreviations was used to report the action.

Regional newspapers, including the Bryan Daily Eagle, the Houston Post, and the Waco News-Tribune made arrangements which successfully picked up the transmissions, which they noted came in faster than the Associated Press wire service bulletins.

=== WTAW ===
Initially there were no formal standards for radio broadcasting, which were being made on an experimental basis by stations operating under a variety of license classifications. However, effective December 1, 1921, the United States Department of Commerce, which supervised radio at this time, issued a regulation requiring that stations making broadcasts intended for the general public now had to operate under a "Limited Commercial" license. WTAW received its first broadcast license on October 7, 1922, issued to the Agricultural and Mechanical College in College Station, which authorized the use of the 360 meter (833 kHz) "entertainment" wavelength. The call sign was randomly assigned from an alphabetical list of available call letters. (Until late January 1923, new radio stations in Texas were given call signs beginning with "W", instead of the "K" call letters which became standard afterward for all states west of the Mississippi River).

On November 11, 1928, under the provisions of the Federal Radio Commission's General Order 40, WTAW was assigned to 1120 kHz on a timeshare basis with the University of Texas station, KUT. In March 1941, with the implementation of the North American Regional Broadcasting Agreement, WTAW moved to 1150 kHz.

WTAW was initially a non-commercial station. In 1957 it became a commercial station, now owned by the WTAW Broadcasting Company. In 1962, it added an FM station, WTAW-FM, which allowed WTAW's country music format to be heard around the clock; by the 1970s, WTAW-FM had switched to an automated Top 40 format, while the AM station continued with its country sound.

In 1973 Bill Watkins, station manager and owner, hired Sunny Nash to anchor drive-time morning news. The country station's first African American reporter and talk-show host, Nash was a Texas A&M University student, who became the first African American journalism graduate in the school's history in 1977, and first program director of KAMU-FM. Later, Nash was a syndicated newspaper columnist and author of Bigmama Didn't Shop At Woolworth's.

In the 1980s, WTAW was authorized to broadcast at night, with 500 watts, while daytime power remained at 1,000 watts. As country music listening shifted to FM, WTAW began adding talk shows at night.

=== Expanded Band assignment ===
On March 17, 1997 the Federal Communications Commission (FCC) announced that eighty-eight stations had been given permission to move to newly available "Expanded Band" transmitting frequencies, ranging from 1610 to 1700 kHz, with WTAW authorized to move from 1150 to 1620 kHz. An application for the expanded band station was filed on June 16, 1997, which on March 1, 2000 was assigned the call letters KZNE.

The FCC's initial policy was that both the original station and its expanded band counterpart could operate simultaneously for up to five years, after which owners would have to turn in one of the two licenses, depending on whether they preferred the new assignment or elected to remain on the original frequency. However, this deadline has been extended multiple times, and the stations on both 1150 and 1620 kHz have remained authorized. One restriction is that the FCC has generally required paired original and expanded band stations to remain under common ownership.

=== KZNE ===
On May 3, 2000 the stations on 1150 and 1620 kHz swapped identities, with 1150 becoming sports radio KZNE (while maintaining its longtime role as the flagship of Texas A&M Aggies athletics), and 1620 inheriting the historic WTAW call letters and its talk radio format. Although for the average listener this meant that WTAW had moved from 1150 kHz to 1620 kHz, and KNZE had done the reverse, according to FCC regulatory practices the same station (as Facility ID #7632 in FCC nomenclature) continued to be licensed on 1150 kHz, with just a call letter change taking place.

On December 4, 2003, KZNE on 1150 kHz and WTAW on 1620 kHz and were jointly sold to Bryan Broadcasting. On May 4, 2015, KZNE began simulcasting on FM translator K274CM (102.7 FM) College Station. As of May 2019, the current translator is K229DK (93.7 FM).
