= Chuck FM =

Chuck FM may refer to the following radio stations:

- WFZZ, Green Bay, Wisconsin
- WAVF, Hanahan, South Carolina
- Former branding of W258CB, Greenville, South Carolina
- WXKT, Gainesville, GA
- CKNG-FM, Edmonton, Alberta, since 2018
