= WWMM =

WWMM may refer to:

- WWMM-LP, a low-power radio station (107.5 FM) licensed to serve Collinsville, Connecticut, United States
- WMAN-FM, a radio station (98.3 FM) licensed to serve Fredericktown, Ohio, United States, which held the call sign WWMM from 2011 to 2012
- WJQX, a radio station (100.5 FM) licensed to serve Helena, Alabama, United States, which held the call sign WWMM from 2008 to 2010
- WJMZ-FM, a radio station (107.3 FM) licensed to serve Anderson, South Carolina, United States, which held the call sign WWMM from 1991 to 1993
- WCPY, a radio station (92.7 FM) licensed to serve Arlington Heights, Illinois, United States, which held the call sign WWMM from 1972 to 1981
