= KKLB =

KKLB may refer to:

- KKLB (FM), a radio station (89.1 FM) licensed to serve Bartlesville, Oklahoma, United States
- KLXZ, a radio station (91.3 FM) licensed to serve Ruidoso, New Mexico, United States, which held the call sign KKLB from 2013 to 2021
- KPWJ, a radio station (107.7 FM) licensed to serve Madisonville, Texas, United States, which held the call sign KKLB from 2007 to 2012
- KVLR, a radio station (92.5 FM) licensed to serve Elgin, Texas, which held the call sign KKLB from 1990 to 2007
