= WTAW (AM) =

Radio station in College Station, Texas

- College Station, Texas; United States
- Broadcast area: Brazos Valley
- Frequency: 1620 kHz (HD Radio)
- Branding: News Talk 1620 94.5 WTAW

Programming
- Format: Talk radio
- Affiliations: Compass Media Networks; Fox News Radio; Premiere Networks; Westwood One

Ownership
- Owner: Bryan Broadcasting Company; (Bryan Broadcasting License Corporation)
- Sister stations: KNDE, KZNE, KWBC, KAGC, WTAW-FM, KPWJ, KKEE, KJCS

History
- First air date: May 3, 2000
- Former call signs: KAZW (1998–2000; CP); KZNE (2000)
- Call sign meaning: "Watch The Aggies Win" (slogan adopted for the original randomly assigned call letters of 1150 AM facility, now KZNE; swapped to this facility in 2000)

Technical information
- Licensing authority: FCC
- Facility ID: 87145
- Class: B
- Power: 10,000 watts (day); 1,000 watts (night)
- Transmitter coordinates: 30°37′15.00″N 96°15′16.00″W
- Translator: 94.5 K233DU (College Station)

Links
- Public license information: Public file; LMS
- Webcast: Listen live
- Website: wtaw.com

WTAW (1620 kHz), branded as "News Talk 1620 94.5 WTAW", is a commercial talk radio station in College Station, Texas. Owned by the Bryan Broadcasting Company, WTAW covers College Station, Bryan and much of the Brazos Valley. Its studios and offices are located in College Station.

By day, WTAW is powered at 10,000 watts, dropping down to 1,000 watts at night. Its transmitter site is on Golden Trail, off Texas State Highway 30. In addition to a standard analog transmission, WTAW broadcasts in HD Radio, using the in-band on-channel digital standard. The programming is also heard on 250-watt FM translator K233DU at 94.5 MHz in College Station.

== Programming ==
Weekdays on WTAW begin with Scott DeLucia hosting the morning drive time program, The Infomaniacs along with Chelsea Reber on news and Zach Taylor on sports. The show is known for quick wit and Zach being made fun of by the other hosts. The rest of the weekday schedule is nationally syndicated talk shows: The Glenn Beck Radio Program, The Clay Travis and Buck Sexton Show, The Sean Hannity Show, The Joe Pags Show, America at Night with McGraw Milhaven, Coast to Coast AM with George Noory and This Morning, America's First News with Gordon Deal.

== History ==
=== KAZW / KZNE ===
WTAW originated as the expanded band "twin" of an existing station on the standard AM band. On March 17, 1997, the Federal Communications Commission (FCC) announced that eighty-eight stations had been given permission to move to newly available "Expanded Band" transmitting frequencies, ranging from 1610 to 1700 kHz. What was then-WTAW on 1150 kHz was authorized to move to 1620 kHz. An application for the expanded band station was filed on June 16, 1997, which was assigned the call letters KAZW on January 9, 1998. That was changed to KZNE on March 1, 2000.

The FCC's initial policy was that both the original station and its expanded band counterpart could operate simultaneously for up to five years, after which owners would have to turn in one of the two licenses, depending on whether they preferred the new assignment or elected to remain on the original frequency. However, this deadline has been extended multiple times, and the stations on both 1150 and 1620 kHz have remained authorized. One restriction is that the FCC has generally required paired original and expanded band stations to remain under common ownership.

=== WTAW ===
On May 3, 2000, the stations on 1150 and 1620 kHz swapped identities, with 1150 becoming sports radio KZNE (while maintaining its longtime role as the flagship of Texas A&M Aggies athletics), and 1620 inheriting the historic WTAW call letters and its talk radio format. Although for the average listener this meant that WTAW had moved from 1150 to 1620 kHz, and KNZE had done the reverse, according to FCC regulatory practices the same station on 1620 kHz continued to be licensed (Facility ID 87145 in FCC nomenclature), with just call letter changes taking place. While most radio stations in Texas have call letters beginning with a "K", the WTAW call sign, which was randomly assigned from a sequential list, dates back to 1922, when Texas was still in "W" territory. The WTAW call sign is one of the oldest in the United States, and the station later adopted the slogan "Watch The Aggies Win".

On December 4, 2003, WTAW and KZNE were sold to Bryan Broadcasting. In 2021, WTAW was awarded an NAB Marconi Radio Award for "Small Market Station of the Year."
