= NAB Marconi Radio Awards =

Radio awards

"Marconi Award" links here. Note that in the Netherlands, the radio academy awards are also called Marconi Awards.

The Marconi Radio Awards are presented annually by the National Association of Broadcasters (NAB) to the top radio stations and on-air personalities in the United States. The awards are named in honor of Guglielmo Marconi, the man generally credited as the "father of wireless telegraphy". NAB member stations submit nominations. A task force determines the finalists and the Marconi Radio Award Selection Academy votes on the winners, who receive their awards in the fall.

== Marconi Radio Awards for 2026 ==
=== Legendary Station ===
- WIVK-FM, Knoxville, TN

=== Legendary Station Manager of the Year ===
- Julie Koehn, WLEN-FM, Adrian, MI

=== Network/Syndicated Personality of the Year ===
- The Bob & Sheri Show, WKQC-FM, Beasley, Charlotte, NC

=== Best Radio Podcast of the Year ===
- “Purple Daily,” KSTP-AM, Saint Paul, MN

=== Stations of the Year by market size ===
- Major Market Station of the Year: WBMX-FM, Boston, MA
- Large Market of the Year: WYXB-FM, Indianapolis, IN
- Medium Market of the Year: WYCT-FM, Pensacola, FL
- Small Market of the Year: KBHP-FM, Bemidji, MN

=== Personalities of the Year by market size ===
- Major Market Personality of the Year: Karson and Kennedy, WBMX-FM, Boston, MA
- Large Market Personality of the Year: Karen Dalessandro, KSLX-FM, Phoenix, AZ
- Medium Market Personality of the Year: Ron Olson and Karen Perrin, WRVR-FM, Memphis, TN
- Small Market Personality of the Year: Chris Lawrence, WCHS-AM, Charleston, WV

=== Stations of the Year by format ===
- Adult Contemporary (AC) Radio Station of the Year: KBIG-FM, Los Angeles, CA
- Classic Hits Radio Station of the Year: WCBS-FM, New York, NY
- College Radio Station of the Year: WRRC-FM, Rider University, Lawrenceville, NJ
- Contemporary Hits Radio (CHR) Station of the Year: KRBE-FM, Houston, TX
- Country Radio Station of the Year: KKBQ-FM, Houston, TX
- News/Talk Radio Station of the Year: WSB-AM, Atlanta, GA
- Religious Radio Station of the Year: WGTS-FM, Washington, DC
- Rock Radio Station of the Year: WIYY-FM, Baltimore, MD
- Spanish Language Radio Station of the Year: KOVE-FM, Houston, TX
- Sports Radio Station of the Year: WEEI-FM, Boston, MA
- Urban Radio Station of the Year: WHQT-FM, Miami, FL

== Marconi Radio Awards for 2025 ==
=== Legendary Station ===
- WMMR-FM, Philadelphia, PA

=== Legendary Station Manager of the Year ===
- Nick Martin, Big River Broadcasting Corp., Florence, AL

=== Network/Syndicated Personality of the Year ===
- Colin Cowherd, Premiere Networks, Los Angeles, CA

=== Best Radio Podcast of the Year ===
- "Behind The Song", WDRV-FM, Chicago, IL

=== Stations of the Year by market size ===
- Major Market: WMMR-FM, Philadelphia, PA
- Large Market: KDKA-FM, Pittsburgh, PA
- Medium Market: KRMG-FM, Tulsa, OK
- Small Market: WTAW-AM, College Station, TX

=== Personalities of the Year by market size ===
- Major Market: Preston Elliot and Steve Morrison, WMMR-FM, Philadelphia, PA
- Large Market: Mitch Albom, WJR-AM, Detroit, MI
- Medium Market: Larry Hansgen, WHIO-FM, Dayton, OH
- Small Market: Mark Starling, WWNC-AM, Asheville, NC

=== Stations of the Year by format ===
- Adult Contemporary (AC): WWBX-FM, Boston, MA
- Classic Hits: WOMC-FM, Detroit, MI
- College: WRHU-FM, Hofstra University, Hempstead, NY
- Contemporary Hits Radio (CHR): WDJX-FM, Louisville, KY
- Country: KYGO-FM, Denver, CO
- News/Talk: WBAL-AM, Baltimore, MD
- Religious: WPZE-FM, Atlanta, GA
- Rock: WDRV-FM, Chicago, IL
- Spanish: WMIA-FM, Miami, FL
- Sports: WXYT-FM, Detroit, MI
- Urban: KMJQ-FM, Houston, TX

== Marconi Radio Awards for 2024 ==
=== Legendary Station ===
- KYGO-FM, Denver, CO

=== Legendary Station Manager of the Year ===
- Bennett Zier, Audacy, VA

=== Network/Syndicated Personality of the Year ===
- Erica Campbell, Reach Media/Urban One, Dallas, TX

=== Best Radio Podcast of the Year ===
- "El Bueno, La Mala y El Feo", Univision Radio, Los Angeles, CA

=== Stations of the Year by market size ===
- Major Market: KTCK-AM, Dallas, TX
- Large Market: WWRM-FM, Tampa, FL
- Medium Market: WNRP-AM, Pensacola, FL
- Small Market: KQRQ-FM, Rapid City, SD

=== Personalities of the Year by market size ===
- Major Market: Rachel Ryan, KSCS-FM, Dallas, TX
- Large Market: Dan Mandis, WWTN-FM, Nashville, TN
- Medium Market: Andy Beckman & Kat Walburn, WAJI-FM, Fort Wayne, IN.
- Small Market: Kat Mykals, WGBF-AM, Evansville, IN

=== Stations of the Year by format ===
- Adult Contemporary (AC): WTVR-FM, Richmond, VA
- Classic Hits: WGRR-FM, Cincinnati, OH
- College: WPSC-FM, William Paterson University, Wayne, NJ
- Contemporary Hits Radio (CHR): WBLI-FM, Long Island, NY
- Country: WXTU-FM, Philadelphia, PA
- News/Talk: KDKA-AM, Pittsburgh, PA.
- Religious: WNNL-FM, Raleigh, NC
- Rock: KQMT-FM, Denver, CO
- Spanish: WLZL-FM, Washington, D.C.
- Sports: KKFN-FM, Denver, CO
- Urban: WBTJ-FM, Richmond, VA

== Marconi Radio Awards for 2023 ==
=== Legendary Station ===
- KCBS-AM, San Francisco-Oakland-San Jose, CA

=== Legendary Station Manager of the Year ===
- Debbie Kenyon, Audacy, Detroit, MI

=== Network/Syndicated Personality of the Year ===
- Rich Eisen, Westwood One

=== Best Radio Podcast of the Year ===
- "The Letter", KSL-FM, Salt Lake City, UT

=== Stations of the Year by market size ===
- Major Market: WALR-FM, Atlanta, GA
- Large Market: KSTP-FM, Minneapolis-St. Paul, MN
- Medium Market: WXKB-FM, Ft. Myers-Naples, FL
- Small Market: WIKY-FM, Evansville, IN

=== Personalities of the Year by market size ===
- Major Market: Lin Brehmer, WXRT-FM, Chicago, IL
- Large Market: Dave Ryan with Falen, Jenny and Drake, KDWB-FM, Minneapolis-St. Paul, MN
- Medium Market: Ashley Adams, Roger Todd and Michele Silva, WJXB-FM, Knoxville, TN
- Small Market: Kevin Hilley and Erin Hart, KATI-FM, Columbia-Jefferson City, MO

=== Stations of the Year by format ===
- Adult Contemporary (AC): KODA-FM, Houston, TX
- Classic Hits: KONO-FM, San Antonio, TX
- College: WSOU-FM, Seton Hall University, South Orange, NJ
- Contemporary Hits Radio (CHR): WAPE-FM, Jacksonville, FL
- Country: KYGO-FM, Denver, CO
- News/Talk: WTOP-FM, Washington, D.C.
- Religious: KLTY-FM, Dallas-Ft. Worth, TX
- Rock: WMMR-FM, Philadelphia, PA
- Spanish: WLKQ-FM, Atlanta, GA
- Sports: WBZ-FM, Boston, MA
- Urban: WHQT-FM, Miami-Ft. Lauderdale, FL

== Marconi Radio Awards for 2022 ==
=== Legendary Station ===
- KTAR-FM, Phoenix, AZ

=== Legendary Station Manager of the Year ===
- Joel Oxley, WTOP-FM, Washington, D.C.

=== Network/Syndicated Personality of the Year ===
- Dan Patrick, Premiere Networks

=== Best Radio Podcast of the Year ===
- "COLD Season 2", KSL-FM, Salt Lake City, UT

=== Stations of the Year by market size ===
- Major Market: WSB-AM Atlanta, GA
- Large Market: WYCD-FM, Detroit, MI
- Medium Market: WOWO-AM, Fort Wayne, IN
- Small Market: WXFL-FM, Florence, AL

=== Personalities of the Year by market size ===
- Major Market: Greg Hill, WEEI-FM, Boston, MA
- Large Market: Chris O'Brien and Janeen Coyle, WGRR-FM, Cincinnati, OH
- Medium Market: Mo & StyckMan, WUSY-FM, Chattanooga, TN
- Small Market: Kristin Monica, KTXY-FM, Columbia, MO

=== Stations of the Year by format ===
- Adult Contemporary (AC): KSTP-FM, Minneapolis-St. Paul, MN
- Classic Hits: WMGK-FM, Philadelphia, PA
- College: WRHU-FM, Hofstra University, Hempstead, NY
- Contemporary Hits Radio (CHR): KTXY-FM, Columbia, MO
- Country: KSCS-FM, Dallas-Fort Worth, TX
- News/Talk: KRMG-FM, Tulsa, OK
- Religious: WFMV-AM, Columbia, SC
- Rock: KCMQ-FM, Columbia, MO
- Spanish: WZTU-FM, Miami, FL
- Sports: WXYT-FM, Detroit, MI
- Urban: WALR-FM, Atlanta, GA

== Marconi Radio Awards for 2021 ==
=== Legendary Station ===
- WSB-AM Atlanta, GA

=== Legendary Station Manager of the Year ===
- Ben Downs, Bryan Broadcasting

=== Network/Syndicated Personality of the Year ===
- Rickey Smiley, Reach Media Inc.

=== Best Radio Podcast of the Year ===
- "We Need to Talk", WGTS-FM, Washington, D.C.

=== Stations of the Year by market size ===
- Major Market: KYW, Philadelphia, PA
- Large Market: KTMY-FM, Minneapolis/St. Paul, MN
- Medium Market: KRMG-FM, Tulsa, OK
- Small Market: WTAW-AM, College Station, TX

=== Personalities of the Year by market size ===
- Major Market: The Musers - Dunham, Miller, & Keith, KTCK-AM, Dallas, TX
- Large Market: Ann Kelly, WDUV-FM, Tampa Bay, FL
- Medium Market: Dan Potter, KRMG-FM, Tulsa, OK
- Small Market: Frito and Katy, KNDE-FM, College Station, TX

=== Stations of the Year by format ===
- Adult Contemporary (AC): WTMX-FM, Chicago, IL
- Classic Hits: WCBS-FM, New York, NY
- College: WPSC-FM, William Paterson University, Wayne, NJ
- Contemporary Hits Radio (CHR): KNDE-FM, College Station, TX
- Country: WYCD-FM, Detroit, MI
- News/Talk: WTOP-FM, Washington, D.C.
- Religious: WGTS-FM, Washington, D.C.
- Rock: KLOS-FM, Los Angeles, CA
- Spanish: KLLI-FM, Los Angeles, CA
- Sports: KTCK-AM, Dallas, TX
- Urban: WEDR-FM, Miami, FL

== Marconi Radio Awards for 2019 ==
=== Legendary Station ===
- KRTH-FM Los Angeles, CA

=== Legendary Station Manager of the Year ===
- Dan Seeman, Hubbard Twin Cities and Hubbard North, St. Paul, MN

=== Network/Syndicated Personality of the Year ===
- Ryan Seacrest, Premiere Networks

=== Best Radio Podcast of the Year ===
- "Denied Justice Podcast", WCCO-AM, Minneapolis, MN

=== Station of the Year by market size ===
- Major Market: WTOP-FM, Washington, D.C.
- Large Market: KSTP-FM, St. Paul, MN
- Medium Market: KSRO-AM, Santa Rosa, CA
- Small Market: KWYO-AM, Sheridan, WY

=== Personality of the Year by market size ===
- Major Market: Felger & Massarotti, WBZ-FM, Boston, MA
- Large Market: Crisco, Dez and Ryan, KSTP-FM, St. Paul, MN
- Medium Market: Mike Street, WBTJ-FM, Richmond, VA
- Small Market: Scotty and Catryna, KCLR-FM, Columbia, MO

=== Station of the Year by format ===
- Adult Contemporary (AC): KRWM-FM, Bellevue, WA
- Classic Hits: WMGK-FM, Philadelphia, PA
- College: WRHU-FM, Hofstra University, Hempstead, NY
- Contemporary Hit Radio (CHR): KRBE-FM, Houston, TX
- Country: KYGO-FM, Denver, CO
- News/Talk: KIRO-FM, Seattle, WA
- Religious: KKFS-FM, Sacramento, CA
- Rock: WRIF-FM, Detroit, MI
- Spanish: KLOL-FM, Houston, TX
- Sports: WBZ-FM, Boston, MA
- Urban: WHQT-FM, Hollywood, FL

== Marconi Radio Awards for 2018 ==
=== Legendary Station ===
- KKBQ-FM Houston, TX

=== Network/Syndicated Personality of the Year ===
- Dan Patrick, Premiere Networks

=== Station of the Year by market size ===
- Major Market: WSB-AM Atlanta, GA
- Large Market: WDBO-FM Orlando, FL
- Medium Market: KSRO-AM Santa Rosa, CA
- Small Market: WWUS-FM Sugarloaf Key, FL

=== Personality of the Year by market size ===
- Major Market: Angie Martinez, WWPR-FM, New York, NY
- Large Market: Joe Kelley, WDBO-FM, Orlando, FL
- Medium Market: Pat Kerrigan, KSRO-AM, Santa Rosa, CA
- Small Market: Brian Byers, WSOY-AM, Decatur, IL

=== Station of the Year by format ===
- Adult Contemporary (AC): KSTP-FM St. Paul, MN
- Classic Hits: KRTH-FM Los Angeles, CA
- Contemporary Hit Radio (CHR): KNDE-FM College Station, TX
- Country: KCLR-FM Columbia, MO
- News/Talk: WTOP-FM Washington, D.C.
- Non-Commercial: WPSC-FM Wayne, NJ
- Religious: KLTY-FM Dallas, TX
- Rock: WMMR-FM Philadelphia, PA
- Spanish: WKAQ-AM San Juan, P.R.
- Sports: WEEI-FM Boston, MA
- Urban: WWPR-FM New York, NY

== Marconi Radio Awards for 2017 ==
=== Legendary Station ===
- WCBS-AM New York, NY

=== Network/Syndicated Personality of the Year ===
- Rickey Smiley, Reach Media Inc.

=== Station of the Year by market size ===
- Major Market: WTOP-FM Washington, D.C.
- Large Market: WKRQ-FM Cincinnati, OH
- Medium Market: KRMG-FM Tulsa, OK
- Small Market: KNDE-FM College Station, TX

=== Personality of the Year by market size ===
- Major Market: Funkmaster Flex, WQHT-FM, New York, NY
- Large Market: Linda Lee, WYCD-FM, Detroit, MI
- Medium Market: Steve McIntosh & Ted Woodward, KNSS-FM, Wichita, KS
- Small Market: Ken Thomas, WJJY-FM, Brainerd, MN

=== Station of the Year by format ===
- Adult Contemporary (AC): WBEB-FM Philadelphia, PA
- Classic Hits: WPBG-FM Peoria, IL
- Contemporary Hit Radio (CHR): KRBE-FM Houston, TX
- Country: KPLX-FM Dallas, TX
- News/Talk: WDBO-FM Orlando, FL
- Non-Commercial: WRHU-FM Hempstead, NY
- Religious: WLIB-AM New York, NY
- Rock: KSHE-FM St. Louis, MO
- Small Market: KNDE-FM College Station, TX
- Sports: KTCK-FM Dallas, TX
- Urban: WHQT-FM Miami, FL

== Marconi Radio Awards for 2016 ==
=== Legendary Station ===
- WINS-AM New York, NY

=== Network/Syndicated Personality of the Year ===
- Delilah, Premiere Networks

=== Station of the Year by market size ===
- Major Market: WBEB-FM Philadelphia, PA
- Large Market: WBAL-AM Baltimore, MD
- Medium Market: WHKO-FM Dayton, OH
- Small Market: WKDZ-FM Cadiz, KY

=== Personality of the Year by market size ===
- Major Market: Toucher & Rich, WBZ-FM Boston, MA
- Large Market: Brooke & Jubal, KQMV-FM Seattle, WA
- Medium Market: Chaz & AJ, WPLR-FM Milford, CT
- Small Market: Brent Carl Fleshman, WHUB-FM Cookeville, TN

=== Station of the Year by format ===
- Adult Contemporary (AC): WLEN-FM Adrian, MI
- Contemporary Hit Radio (CHR): KTXY-FM Columbia, MO
- Country: KKBQ-FM Houston, TX
- News/Talk: WTOP-FM Washington, D.C.
- Classic Hits: KRTH-FM Los Angeles, CA
- Religious: KLTY-FM Dallas, TX
- Rock: KCMQ-FM Columbia, MO
- Spanish: KLOL-FM Houston, TX
- Sports: WXYT-FM Detroit, MI
- Urban: WHUR-FM Washington, D.C.
- Non-Commercial: WSOU-FM South Orange, NJ

== Marconi Radio Awards for 2015 ==
=== Legendary Station ===
- KYW-AM Philadelphia, PA

=== Network/Syndicated Personality of the Year ===
- Steve Harvey, Premiere Radio Networks

=== Station of the Year by market size ===
- Major Market: WTOP-FM Washington, D.C.
- Large Market: KSTP-FM St Paul, MN
- Medium Market: KRMG-AM Tulsa, OK
- Small Market: WLEN-FM Adrian, MI

=== Personality of the Year by market size ===
- Major Market: Eric & Kathy, WTMX-FM Chicago, IL
- Large Market: Gene & Julie Gates, WRAL-FM Raleigh, NC
- Medium Market: Dan Potter, KRMG-AM Tulsa, OK
- Small Market: Brian Byers, WSOY-AM Decatur, IL

=== Station of the Year by format ===
- Adult Contemporary (AC): WDUV-FM Tampa, FL
- Contemporary Hit Radio (CHR): KQMV-FM Seattle, WA
- Country: WUBE-FM Cincinnati, OH
- News/Talk: WSB-AM Atlanta, GA
- Classic Hits: KONO-FM San Antonio, TX
- Religious: WPRS-FM Washington, D.C.
- Rock: WDRV-FM Chicago, IL
- Sports: WFAN-AM New York, NY
- Urban: WBLS-FM New York, NY
- Non-Commercial: WKAR-FM East Lansing, MI

== Marconi Radio Awards for 2014 ==
=== Legendary Station ===
- WFAN-FM New York, NY

=== Network/Syndicated Personality of the Year ===
- Rush Limbaugh, Premiere Radio Networks

=== Station of the Year by market size ===
- Major Market: KKBQ-FM Houston, TX
- Large Market: WTMJ-AM Milwaukee, WI
- Medium Market: WOWO-AM Fort Wayne, IN
- Small Market: KFGO Fargo, ND

=== Personality of the Year by market size ===
- Major Market: Kevin and Bean, KROQ-FM Los Angeles, CA
- Large Market: Ryan and Shannon, KSTP-FM St. Paul, MN
- Medium Market: Kevin Miller, KIDO-AM Boise, ID
- Small Market: Dottie Ray, KXIC-AM Iowa City, IA

=== Station of the Year by format ===
- Adult Contemporary (AC): WBEB-FM Philadelphia, PA
- Contemporary Hit Radio (CHR): KQKS-FM Denver, CO
- Country: KCYY-FM San Antonio, TX
- News/Talk: WLW-AM Cincinnati, OH
- Oldies: WOGL-FM Philadelphia, PA
- Religious: KLTY-FM Dallas, TX
- Rock: KROQ-FM Los Angeles, CA
- Spanish: KLZT-FM Austin, TX
- Sports: WBZ-FM Boston, MA
- Urban: WHQT-FM Coral Gables, FL
- Non-Commercial: WRHU-FM Long Island, NY

== Marconi Radio Awards for 2013 ==
=== Legendary Station ===
- WBBM-AM Chicago, IL

=== Network/Syndicated Personality of the Year ===
- Steve Harvey, Premiere Radio Networks

=== Station of the Year by market size ===
- Major Market: WBEB-FM Philadelphia, PA
- Large Market: KSTP-FM St. Paul, MN
- Medium Market: KRMG-FM Tulsa, OK
- Small Market: WKDZ-FM Cadiz, KY

=== Personality of the Year by market size ===
- Major Market: Eric & Kathy, WTMX-FM Chicago, IL
- Large Market: Cornbread, WIL-FM St. Louis, MO
- Medium Market: Brian Byers, WSOY-AM Decatur, IL
- Small Market: Monk & Kelly, WGSQ-AM Cookeville, TN

=== Spanish Format Personality of the Year ===
- Javier Romero, WAMR-FM Miami, FL

=== Station of the Year by format ===
- Adult Contemporary (AC): WTMX-FM Chicago, IL
- Contemporary Hit Radio (CHR): WRDW-FM Philadelphia, PA
- Country: KKBQ-FM Houston, TX
- News/Talk: WBZ-AM Boston, MA
- Religious: KLRC-FM Siloam Springs, AR
- Rock: WZLX-FM Boston, MA
- Spanish: KLOL-FM Houston, TX
- Sports: KTCK-FM Dallas, TX
- Urban: WVEE-FM Atlanta, GA

== Marconi Radio Awards for 2012 ==
=== Legendary Station ===
- KSTP-FM St. Paul, MN

=== Network Syndicated Personality of the Year ===
- Dan Patrick, Direct TV/Premiere Networks

=== Station of the Year by market size ===
- Major: WTOP-FM Washington, DC
- Large: KSON-FM San Diego, CA
- Medium: WHO-AM Des Moines, IA
- Small: WVAQ-FM Morgantown, WV

=== Personality of the Year by market size ===
- Major: Mike Francesa, WFAN-AM New York, NY
- Large: Moon and Staci, KSTP-FM St. Paul, MN
- Medium: Jan Mickelson, WHO-AM Des Moines, IA
- Small: Scotty and Carissa in the Morning, KCLR-FM Columbia, MO

=== Station of the Year by format ===
- Adult Contemporary (AC): WBEB-FM Philadelphia, PA
- Contemporary Hit Radio (CHR): KIIS-FM Los Angeles, CA
- Country: WYCD-FM Detroit, MI
- News/Talk/Sports: WTOP-FM Washington, DC
- Oldies: WOGL-FM Philadelphia, PA
- Religious: KLTY-FM Dallas, TX
- Rock: KINK-FM Portland, OR
- Spanish: KMVK-FM Dallas, TX
- Sports: WEEI-FM Boston, MA
- Urban: WBLS-FM New York, NY

== Marconi Radio Awards for 2011 ==
=== Legendary Station ===
- WTOP-FM Washington, DC

=== Network Syndicated Personality of the Year ===
- Ryan Seacrest, Premiere Networks

=== Station of the Year by market size ===
- Major: WBEB-FM Philadelphia, PA
- Large: WCCO-AM Minneapolis, MN
- Medium: WDEL Wilmington, DE
- Small: WLEN-FM Adrian, MI

=== Personality of the Year by market size ===
- Major: Kevin and Bean, KROQ-FM Los Angeles, CA
- Large: Dave Ryan, KDWB-FM Minneapolis, MN
- Medium: Van Harden and Bonnie Lucas, WHO-AM Des Moines, IA
- Small: Dennis Jon Bailey and Diane Douglas, WIKY-FM, Evansville, IN
- Spanish: Edgar "Shoboy" Sotelo, KMVK-FM Dallas, TX

=== Station of the Year by format ===
- Adult Contemporary (AC): WMGX-FM South Portland, ME
- Contemporary Hit Radio (CHR): KPWR-FM Los Angeles, CA
- Country: KYGO-FM Denver, CO
- News/Talk/Sports: WSB-AM Atlanta, GA
- Oldies: WOMC-FM Detroit, MI
- Religious: KNOM-AM Nome, AK
- Rock: WAPL-FM Green Bay, WI
- Spanish: KLVE-FM Los Angeles, CA
- Sports: WBZ-FM Boston, MA
- Urban: WHUR-FM Washington, DC

== Marconi Radio Awards for 2010 ==
=== Legendary Station ===
- WBZ-AM Boston, MA

=== Network Syndicated Personality of the Year ===
- Scott Shannon, Citadel Broadcasting

=== Station of the Year by market size ===
- Major: WTOP-FM Washington, DC
- Large: KSTP-FM Saint Paul, MN
- Medium: KKOB-AM Albuquerque, NM
- Small: KFGO Fargo, ND

=== Personality of the Year by market size ===
- Major: Ronn Owens, KGO-AM San Francisco, CA
- Large: Doug Wright, KSL-AM Salt Lake City, UT
- Medium: Kelly Mac, WJMZ-FM Greenville, SC
- Small: Leo Greco, WMT-AM Cedar Rapids, IA
- Spanish: Eddie "Piolin" Sotelo, KSCA-FM, Los Angeles, CA

=== Station of the Year by format ===
- Adult Contemporary (AC): WMJX-FM Boston, MA
- Contemporary Hit Radio (CHR): KIIS-FM Los Angeles, CA
- Country: WFMS Indianapolis, IN
- News/Talk/Sports: WTOP-FM Washington, DC
- Oldies: WCBS-FM New York, NY
- Religious: WMIT-FM Black Mountain, NC
- Rock: WMMR-FM Philadelphia, PA
- Spanish: WOJO-FM Chicago, IL
- Sports: WFAN-AM New York, NY
- Urban: WVEE-FM Atlanta, GA

== Marconi Radio Awards for 2009 ==
Hosted by Laura Ingraham, the awards show included a live performance by Brian McKnight, host of "The Brian McKnight Show" and a renowned R&B singer.

=== Legendary Station ===
- KKOB (770 AM) Albuquerque, NM

=== Network Syndicated Personality of the Year ===
- Dave Ramsey, The Lampo Group

=== Station of the Year by market size ===
- Major: WBEB (101.1 FM) Philadelphia, PA
- Large: WIBC (93.1 FM) Indianapolis, IN
- Medium: WHO (1040 AM) Des Moines, IA
- Small: WJBC (1230 AM) Bloomington, IL

=== Personality of the Year by market size ===
- Major: Matt Siegel, WXKS-FM (107.9 FM) Boston MA
- Large: Bill Cunningham, WLW (700 AM) Cincinnati, OH
- Medium: Van & Bonnie, WHO (1040 AM) Des Moines, IA
- Small: Lacy Neff, WVAQ (101.9 FM) Morgantown, WV

=== Spanish format Personality of the Year ===
- Alberto Alegre, KSAG (720 AM) San Antonio, TX

=== Station of the Year by format ===
- Adult Contemporary (AC): WBEB (101.1 FM) Philadelphia, PA
- Contemporary Hit Radio (CHR): WVAQ (101.9 FM) Morgantown, WV
- Country: KYGO-FM (98.5 FM) Denver, CO
- News/Talk/Sports: WGN (720 AM) Chicago, IL
- Oldies: WMXJ (102.7 FM) Miami, FL
- Religious: KLTY (94.9 FM) Dallas, TX
- Rock: KQRS-FM (92.5 FM) Minneapolis, MN
- Spanish: KLVE (107.5 FM) Los Angeles, CA
- Sports: WGR (550 AM) Buffalo, NY
- Urban: WJMZ-FM (107.3 FM) Greenville, SC

== Marconi Radio Awards for 2008 ==
Hosted by Billy Bush.

=== Legendary Station ===
- WSM-AM, Nashville, TN

=== Network Syndicated Personality of the Year ===
- Glenn Beck, Premiere Radio Networks

=== Station of the Year by market size ===
- Major: WMAL, Washington, DC
- Large: KOA-AM, Denver, CO
- Medium: WLAV-FM, Grand Rapids, MI
- Small: WGIL-AM, Galesburg, IL

=== Personality of the Year by market size ===
- Major: Ryan Seacrest, KIIS-FM Los Angeles, CA
- Large: Kelly, Mudflap & JoJo Turnbeaugh, KYGO-FM Denver, CO
- Medium: Tony Gates, WLAV-FM Grand Rapids, MI
- Small: George & Katie, WAXX-FM Eau Claire, WI

=== Spanish format Personality of the Year ===
- Eddie "Piolín" Sotelo, KSCA-FM Los Angeles, CA

=== Station of the Year by format ===
- Adult Contemporary (AC): WTMX-FM, Chicago, IL
- Contemporary Hit Radio (CHR): KHKS-FM, Dallas, TX
- Country: WFMS-FM, Indianapolis, IN
- News/Talk/Sports: KFI-AM, Los Angeles, CA
- Oldies: KQQL-FM, Minneapolis, MN
- Religious: WMIT-FM, Black Mountain, NC
- Rock: WAPL-FM Appleton, WI
- Spanish: KSCA-FM, Los Angeles, CA
- Sports: WEEI-AM Boston, MA
- Urban: WBLS-FM New York, NY

== Marconi Radio Awards for 2007 ==
Hosted by Glenn Beck.

=== Legendary Station ===
- WWL-AM, New Orleans, LA

=== Network Syndicated Personality of the Year ===
- Sean Hannity, ABC Radio Networks

=== Station of the Year by market size ===
- Major: WGN-AM, Chicago, IL
- Large: KSTP-FM, Minneapolis, MN
- Medium: WWL-AM, New Orleans, LA
- Small: WAXX-FM, Eau Claire, WI

=== Personality of the Year by market size ===
- Major: Big Boy, KPWR-FM, Los Angeles, CA
- Large: Chuck Collier, WGAR-FM, Cleveland, OH
- Medium: Van & Bonnie, WHO-AM, Des Moines, IA
- Small: Mike McNamara, KNOX-AM, Grand Forks, ND

=== Station of the Year by format ===
- Adult Contemporary (AC): WBEB-FM, Philadelphia, PA
- Contemporary Hit Radio (CHR): WVAQ-FM, Morgantown, WV
- Country: WIVK-FM, Knoxville, TN
- News/Talk/Sports: WWL-AM, New Orleans, LA
- Oldies: WWSW-FM, Pittsburgh, PA
- Religious: KLTY-FM, Dallas, TX
- Rock: WMMR-FM, Philadelphia, PA
- Spanish: KLVE-FM, Los Angeles, CA
- Sports: KTCK-AM, Dallas, TX
- Urban: WHUR-FM, Washington, DC

== Marconi Radio Awards for 2006 ==
=== Legendary Station ===
- WBEB-FM, Philadelphia, Pennsylvania

=== Network Syndicated Personality of the Year ===
- The Bob & Tom Show, Premiere Radio Networks

=== Station of the Year by market size ===
- Major: KGO-AM, San Francisco, California
- Large: WEEI-AM, Boston, Massachusetts
- Medium: WIVK-FM, Knoxville, Tennessee
- Small: KGMI-AM, Bellingham, Washington

=== Personality of the Year by market size ===
- Major: Scott Slade, WSB-AM, Atlanta, Georgia
- Large: Tom Barnard, KQRS-FM, Minneapolis, Minnesota
- Medium: Brent Johnson, WTCB-FM, Columbia, South Carolina
- Small: Lacy Neff, WVAQ-FM, Morgantown, West Virginia

=== Station of the Year by format ===
- Adult Contemporary (AC): KOIT-FM, San Francisco, California
- Contemporary Hit Radio (CHR): WSTW-FM, Wilmington, Delaware
- Country: KYGO-FM, Denver, Colorado
- News/Talk/Sports: KGO-AM, San Francisco, California
- Oldies: WMJI-FM, Cleveland, Ohio.
- Religious: KJIL-FM, Meade, Kansas
- Rock: WEBN-FM, Cincinnati, Ohio
- Spanish: KSCA-FM, Los Angeles, California
- Sports: WEEI-AM, Boston, Massachusetts
- Urban: WGCI-FM, Chicago, Illinois

== Marconi Radio Awards for 2005 ==
=== Legendary Station ===
- WIBC, Indianapolis, Indiana

=== Network Syndicated Personality of the Year ===
- Rush H. Limbaugh, Premiere Radio Networks

=== Station of the Year by market size ===
- Major: WTOP (AM), Washington, DC
- Large: WSB-AM, Atlanta, Georgia
- Medium: WDBO, Orlando, Florida
- Small: WJBC, Bloomington, Illinois

=== Personality of the Year by market size ===
- Major: Bill Handel, KFI-AM, Los Angeles, California
- Large: Lanigan & Malone, WMJI-FM, Cleveland, Ohio
- Medium: Don Weeks, WGY-AM, Albany, New York
- Small: Ward Jacobson & Cathy Blythe, KFOR-AM, Lincoln, Nebraska

=== Station of the Year by format ===
- Adult Contemporary (AC): WBEB-FM, Philadelphia, Pennsylvania
- Adult Standards: KJUL-FM, Las Vegas, Nevada
- Contemporary Hit Radio (CHR): WSTR-FM, Atlanta, Georgia
- Classical: KDFC-FM, San Francisco, California
- Country: WIVK-FM, Knoxville, Tennessee
- NAC/Jazz: KIFM, San Diego, California
- News/Talk/Sports: WIBC, Indianapolis, Indiana
- Oldies: KCMO-FM, Kansas City, Missouri
- Religious: KLTY-FM, Dallas, Texas
- Rock: WFBQ-FM, Indianapolis, Indiana
- Spanish: KLVE-FM, Los Angeles, California
- Urban: WBLS-FM, New York, New York

== Marconi Radio Awards for 2004 ==
=== Legendary Station ===
- WOR New York, N.Y.

=== Network/Syndicated Personality of the Year ===
- Tom Joyner, Reach Media

=== Stations of the Year by Market Size ===
- Major: WBEB-FM Philadelphia, Pa.
- Large: KYGO-FM Denver, Colo.
- Medium: WTMJ-AM Milwaukee, Wis.
- Small: KIHR-AM Hood River, Ore.

=== Personality of the Year by Market Size ===
- Major: Big Boy KPWR-FM, Los Angeles, Calif.
- Large: Scott Slade WSB-AM, Atlanta, Ga.
- Medium: Jim Turner WDBO-AM, Orlando, Fla.
- Small: Terry Cavanaugh WGIL-AM, Galesburg, Ill.

=== Station of the Year by Format ===
- AC: WLEN-FM Adrian, Mich.
- Adult Standards: KABL-AM San Francisco, Calif.
- CHR: KPWR-FM Los Angeles, Calif.
- Classical: WGMS-FM Washington, D.C.
- Country: KYGO-FM Denver, Colo.
- NAC/Jazz: WNUA-FM Chicago, Ill.
- News/Talk/Sports: WGN-AM Chicago, Ill.
- Oldies: WMJI-FM Cleveland, Ohio
- Religious: WNNL-FM Raleigh, N.C.
- Rock: KFOG-FM San Francisco, Calif.
- Spanish: KLQV-FM San Diego, Calif.
- Urban: KPRS-FM Kansas City, Mo.

== Marconi Radio Awards for 2003 ==
=== Legendary Station ===
- WABC New York, N.Y.

=== Network/Syndicated Personality of the Year ===
- Sean Hannity, ABC Radio Networks

=== Stations of the Year by Market Size ===
- Major: KGO San Francisco, Calif.
- Large: WMJI Cleveland, Ohio
- Medium (tie): WIBC Indianapolis, Ind. and WIVK Knoxville, Tenn.
- Small (tie): KLVI Beaumont, Texas and WCRZ Flint, Mich.

=== Personality of the Year by Market Size ===
- Major: Ronn Owens, KGO San Francisco, Calif.
- Large: Preston Westmoreland, KTAR Phoenix, Ariz.
- Medium: Greg Garrison, WIBC Indianapolis, Ind.
- Small: Jim Kerr, KNCO-AM Grass Valley, Calif.

=== Station of the Year by Format ===
- AC: KOIT San Francisco, Calif.
- CHR: WSTR Atlanta, Ga.
- Classical: KDFC San Francisco, Calif.
- Country: KPLX Dallas, Texas
- News/Talk/Sports: WTMJ Milwaukee, Wis.
- Oldies: KCMO-FM Kansas City, Mo.
- Religious: KNOM Nome, Alaska
- Rock: KQRS Minneapolis, Minn.
- Urban: WVAZ Chicago, Ill.

== Marconi Radio Awards for 2002 ==
=== Legendary Station ===
- WSB-AM Atlanta, Ga.

=== Network/Syndicated Personality of the Year ===
- Paul Harvey, "Paul Harvey News and Comment," ABC Radio Network

=== Stations of the Year by Market Size ===
- Major: WGN Chicago, Ill.
- Large: KIRO Seattle, Wash.
- Medium: WFMS Indianapolis, Ind.
- Small: WKDZ Cadiz, Ky.

=== Personalities of the Year by Market Size ===
- Major: Big Boy, KPWR Los Angeles, Calif.
- Large: Jim Scott, WLW Cincinnati, Ohio
- Medium: Cathy Blythe, KFOR Lincoln, Neb.
- Small: Al Caldwell, KLVI Beaumont, Texas

=== Stations of the Year by Format ===
- AC: WLTW New York, N.Y.
- Adult Standards: KABL-AM San Francisco, Calif.
- CHR: KPWR Los Angeles, Calif.
- Country: WFMS Indianapolis, Ind.
- News/Talk/Sports: KGO San Francisco, Calif.
- Oldies: WMJI Cleveland, Ohio
- Religious: KFSH-FM Los Angeles, Calif.
- Rock: KOZT Fort Bragg, Calif.
- Spanish: KGBT-FM McAllen, Texas
- Urban: WAMO-FM Pittsburgh, Pa.

== Marconi Radio Awards for 2001 ==
=== Legendary Station ===
- KNIX Phoenix, Ariz.

=== Network/Syndicated Personality of the Year ===
- Rick Dees, Premiere Radio Networks

=== Stations of the Year by Market Size ===
- Major: KGO San Francisco, Calif.
- Large: KOGO San Diego, Calif.
- Medium: WGY Albany, N.Y.
- Small: WICO-FM Salisbury, Md.

=== Personalities of the Year by Market Size ===
- Major: Matt Siegel, WXKS-FM Boston, Mass.
- Large: Bill Cunningham, WLW Cincinnati, Ohio
- Medium: Mark Belling, WISN Milwaukee, Wis.
- Small: Brian Scott, KTWO Casper, Wyo.

=== Stations of the Year by Format ===
- AC: WALK-FM Nassau/Suffolk, N.Y.
- Adult Standards: WMMB Melbourne, Fla.
- CHR: KIIS-FM Los Angeles, Calif.
- Classical: WGMS Washington, D.C.
- Country: KPLX Dallas, Texas
- NAC/Jazz: WNWV Cleveland, Ohio
- News/Talk/Sports: KKOB-AM Albuquerque, N.M.
- Oldies: KCMO-FM Kansas City, Mo.
- Religious: WMHK Columbia, S.C.
- Rock: WEBN Cincinnati, Ohio
- Spanish: KLNO Dallas, Texas
- Urban: KPRS Kansas City, Mo.

== Marconi Radio Awards for 2000 ==
=== Legendary Station ===
- WEBN Cincinnati, Ohio

=== Network Syndicated Personality of the Year ===
- Rush Limbaugh, "The Rush Limbaugh Show," Premiere Radio Networks

=== Stations of the Year by Market Size ===
- Major: WOMC Detroit, Mich.
- Large: KESZ Phoenix, Ariz.
- Medium: WOOD-AM Grand Rapids, Mich.
- Small: WAXX Eau Claire, Wis.

=== Personalities of the Year by Market Size ===
- Major: Mike Francesa and Chris Russo WFAN New York, N.Y.
- Large: Jay Gilbert WEBN Cincinnati, Ohio
- Medium: Jimmy Matis WFBQ Indianapolis, Ind.
- Small: Tim Wilson WAXX Eau Claire, Wis.

=== Stations of the Year by Format ===
- AC: KSTP-FM Minneapolis, Minn.
- Adult Standards: KVFD, Fort Dodge, Iowa
- CHR: KDWB Minneapoli, Minn.
- Classical: WBQQ Kennebunk, Maine
- Country: WTQR Winston-Salem, N.C.
- NAC/Jazz: WJJZ Philadelphia, Pa.
- News/Talk/Sports: WTMJ Milwaukee, Wis.
- Oldies: WOMC Detroit, Mich.
- Religious: WMBI Chicago, Ill.
- Rock: WFBQ Indianapolis, Ind.
- Spanish: KLAT Houston, Texas
- Urban (tie):WUSL Philadelphia, Pa. and WVEE, Atlanta, Ga.

== Marconi Radio Awards for 1999 ==
=== Legendary Station ===
- KOA Denver, Colo.

=== Network/Syndicated Personality of the Year ===
- Bob Kevoian and Tom Griswold, "The Bob and Tom Show", AMFM Radio Networks

=== Stations of the Year by Market Size ===
- Major: KGO San Francisco, Calif.
- Large: KUDL Kansas City, Mo.
- Medium: WFBQ Indianapolis, Ind.
- Small: KTTS-FM Springfield, Mo.

=== Personalities of the Year by Market Size ===
- Major: Kevin and Bean, KROQ Los Angeles, Calif.
- Large: Steve Kelley, KOA Denver, Colo.
- Medium: Scott Innes, WYNK-FM Baton Rouge, La.
- Small: Scott Kooistra, KYNT Yankton, S.D.

=== Stations of the Year by Format ===
- AC: KUEL Fort Dodge, Iowa
- CHR: WNNK Harrisburg, Pa.
- Classical: KFUO-FM St. Louis, Mo.
- Country: WDAF Kansas City, Mo.
- Oldies: WWSW Pittsburgh, Pa.
- NAC/Jazz: KZJZ St. Louis, Mo.
- Religious/Gospel: WUGN Midland, Mich.
- Rock: WEBN, Cincinnati Ohio
- News/Talk/Sports: WBZ Boston, Mass.
- Spanish: KLTN Houston, Texas
- Urban: WBLX Mobile, Ala.

== Marconi Radio Awards for 1998 ==
=== Legendary Station ===
- WCBS-FM New York, N.Y.

=== Network/Syndicated Personality of the Year ===
- Paul Harvey, ABC Radio Networks

=== Stations of the Year by Market Size ===
- Major: WBZ-AM Boston, Mass.
- Large: WMJI-FM Cleveland, Ohio
- Medium: WNNK-FM Harrisburg, Pa.
- Small: KRKT-FM Albany, Ore.

=== Personalities of the Year by Market Size ===
- Major: Kidd Kraddick, KHKS-FM Dallas, Texas
- Large: Mike Murphy, KCMO-AM Kansas City, Mo.
- Medium: Tim Burns and Sue Campbell, WNNK-FM Harrisburg, Pa.
- Small: John Murphy and George House, WAXX-FM Eau Claire, Wis.

=== Stations of the Year by Format ===
- AC (tie): KYXY-FM San Diego, CA and WLHT-FM Grand Rapids, Mich.
- Adult Standards: KVFD-AM Fort Dodge, Iowa
- CHR: KDWB-FM Minneapolis, Minn.
- Country: KFKF-FM Kansas City, Mo.
- News/Talk/Sports: WCCO-AM Minneapolis, Minn.
- Oldies: WBIG-FM Washington, D.C.
- Religious/Gospel: WCRF-FM Cleveland, Ohio
- Rock: WFBQ-FM Indianapolis, Ind.
- Spanish: KGBT-AM/FM McAllen, Texas
- Urban/R&B: WVEE-FM Atlanta, Ga.

== Marconi Radio Awards for 1997 ==
=== Legendary Station ===
- KVIL-FM Dallas, Texas

=== Network/Syndicated Personality of the Year ===
- Dr. Laura Schlessinger, Synergy Broadcasting

=== Stations of the Year by Market Size ===
- Major: WCBS-FM New York, N.Y.
- Large: WFBQ-FM Indianapolis, Ind.
- Medium: KKOB-AM Albuquerque, N.M.
- Small: KFGO Fargo, N.D.

=== Personalities of the Year by Market Size ===
- Major: Don Imus WFAN-AM, New York, N.Y.
- Large: Bob Kevoian and Tom Griswold, WFBQ-FM Indianapolis, Ind.
- Medium: Van & Bonnie, WHO-AM Des Moines, Iowa
- Small: Bill O’Brian, KRKT-FM Albany, Ore.

=== Stations of the Year by Format ===
- AC: KVIL-FM Dallas, Texas
- Adult Standards: KOGA-AM Ogallala, Neb.
- CHR: WNNK-FM Harrisburg, Pa.
- Classical: WQXR-FM New York, N.Y.
- Country: WSOC-FM Charlotte, N.C.
- NAC/Jazz: WLOQ-FM Orlando, Fla.
- News/Talk/Sports: KFGO Fargo, N.D.
- Oldies: WWSW-AM/FM Pittsburgh, Pa.
- Religious/Gospel: WMHK-FM Columbia, S.C.
- Rock: WDVE-FM Pittsburgh, Pa.
- Spanish: KLVE-FM Los Angeles, Calif.
- Urban/R&B: WVAZ-FM Chicago, Ill.

== Marconi Radio Awards for 1996 ==
=== Legendary Station ===
- WJR-AM Detroit, Mich.

=== Network/Syndicated Personality of the Year ===
- Paul Harvey, ABC Radio Networks

=== Stations of the Year by Market Size ===
- Major: WFAN-AM New York, N.Y.
- Large: WHAS-AM Louisville, Ky.
- Medium: KSSN-FM Little Rock, Ark.
- Small: WRGA-AM Rome, Ga.

=== Personalities of the Year by Market Size ===
- Major: Hudson and Harrigan, KILT-FM Houston, Texas
- Large: Coyote Calhoun, WAMZ-FM Louisville, Ky.
- Medium: Bruce Bond, WNNK-FM Harrisburg, Pa.
- Small: Michael H. McDougald WRGA-AM, Rome, Ga.

=== Stations of the Year by Format ===
- AC/EZ: WLTE-FM Minneapolis, Minn.
- Big Band/Nostalgia: WMMB-AM Melbourne, Fla.
- CHR: KDWB-FM Minneapolis, Minn.
- Classical: WGMS-FM Washington, D.C.
- Country: KMPS-AM/FM Seattle, Wash.
- Jazz: KPLU-FM Tacoma, Wash.
- News/Talk/Sports: WFAN-AM New York, N.Y.
- Oldies: WQSR-FM Baltimore, Md.
- Religious/Gospel: WMBI-FM Chicago, Ill.
- Rock: WFBQ-FM Indianapolis, Ind.
- Spanish: KLTN-FM, Houston, Texas
- Urban/R&B: WJLB-FM Detroit, Mich.

== Marconi Radio Awards for 1995 ==
=== Legendary Station ===
- KGO-AM San Francisco, Calif.

=== Network/Syndicated Personality of the Year ===
- Rush Limbaugh, EFM Media Management

=== Stations of the Year by Market Size ===
- Major: WBZ-AM Boston, Mass.
- Large: WFBQ-FM Indianapolis, Ind.
- Medium: WHO-AM Des Moines, Iowa
- Small: WHIZ-AM Zanesville, Ohio

=== Personalities of the Year by Market Size ===
- Major: Jonathon Brandmeier, WLUP-FM Chicago, Ill.
- Large: Bob Kevoian and Tom Griswold, WFBQ-FM Indianapolis, Ind.
- Medium: Jerry Carr, WMT-AM Cedar Rapids, Iowa
- Small: J. Douglas Williams and Becky Myles, KWOX-FM Woodward, Okla.

=== Stations of the Year by Format ===
- AC/EZ: KOEL-AM Oelwein, Iowa
- Big Band/Nostalgia: KEZW-AM Denver, Colo.
- CHR: WNNK-FM Harrisburg, Pa.
- Classical: WCLV-FM Cleveland, Ohio
- Country: WSIX-FM Nashville, Tenn.
- Jazz: WNWV-FM Cleveland, Ohio
- News/Talk/Sports: WLS-AM Chicago, Ill.
- Oldies: WWSW-AM/FM, Pittsburgh, Pa.
- Religious/Gospel: KKLA-FM Los Angeles, Calif.
- Rock: KROQ-FM Los Angeles, Calif.
- Spanish: KLOK-AM San Jose, Calif.
- Urban/R&B: WVEE-FM Atlanta, Ga.

== Marconi Radio Awards for 1994 ==
=== Legendary Station ===
- KDKA-AM Pittsburgh, Pa.

=== Network/Syndicated Personality of the Year ===
- Don Imus, Westwood One Radio Networks

=== Stations of the Year by Market Size ===
- Major: WJR-AM Detroit, Mich.
- Large: WHAS-AM Louisville, Ky.
- Medium: KLBJ-AM Austin, Texas
- Small: KUOO-FM Spirit Lake, Iowa

=== Personalities of the Year by Market Size ===
- Major: J.P. McCarthy, WJR-AM Detroit, Mich.
- Large: Coyote Calhoun, WAMZ-FM Louisville, Ky.
- Medium: Bobby Byrd, WUSY-FM Chattanooga, Tenn.
- Small: Jeffrey Steffen, KEXL-FM Norfolk, Neb.

=== Stations of the Year by Format ===
- AC/EZ: WSPT-FM Stevens Point, Wis.
- Big Band/Nostalgia: WPEN-AM Philadelphia, Pa.
- CHR: WXKS-FM Medford, Mass.
- Classical: KING-FM Seattle, Wash.
- Country: KSSN-FM Little Rock, Ark.
- Jazz: KIFM San Diego, Calif.
- News/Talk/Sports: KRLD-AM Dallas, Texas
- Religious/Gospel: WVEL-AM Peoria, Ill.
- Rock: KQRS-AM/FM Minneapolis, Minn.
- Spanish: KBNA-AM/FM El Paso, Texas
- Urban/R&B: WROU-FM Dayton, Ohio

== Marconi Radio Awards for 1993 ==
=== Legendary Station ===
- WHO-AM Des Moines, Iowa

=== Network/Syndicated Personality of the Year ===
- Charles Osgood, CBS Radio Networks

=== Stations of the Year by Market Size ===
- Major: WGN-AM Chicago, Ill.
- Large: WCKY-AM Cincinnati, Ohio
- Medium: WHO-AM Des Moines, Iowa
- Small: KWOX-FM Woodward, Okla.

=== Personalities of the Year by Market Size ===
- Major: Dick Purtan, WKQI-FM Detroit, Mich.
- Large: Bob Kevoian and Tom Griswold, WFBQ-FM Indianapolis, Ind.
- Medium: Jim Zabel, WHO-AM Des Moines, Iowa
- Small: Max McCartney, WBIZ-FM Eau Claire, Wis. and Tony "Wradio" Wright, KWOX-FM Woodward, Okla.

=== Stations of the Year by Format ===
- AC/EZ: WHAS-AM Louisville, Ky.
- AOR/Classic Rock: WXRT-FM Chicago, Ill.
- Big Band/Nostalgia: WOKY-AM Milwaukee, Wis.
- Black/Urban: WHRK-FM Memphis, Tenn. and WRKS-FM, New York, N.Y.
- CHR/Top 40: KIIS-AM/FM Los Angeles, Calif.
- Classical: KLEF-FM Anchorage, Alaska
- Country: WWWW-AM/FM Detroit, Mich.
- Jazz/New Age KINK-AM/FM Portland, Ore., KSDS-FM San Diego, Calif. and WQCD-FM New York, N.Y.
- MOR: WMT-AM Cedar Rapids, Iowa
- Oldies: WCBS-FM New York, N.Y.
- News/Talk: WGN-AM Chicago, Ill.
- Religious/Gospel: WAVA-FM Arlington, Va.
- Spanish Language: KGBT-AM Harlingen, Texas

== Marconi Radio Awards for 1992 ==
=== Legendary Station ===
- WCCO-AM Minneapolis, Minn.

=== Network/Syndicated Personality of the Year ===
- Rush Limbaugh, EFM Media Management

=== Stations of the Year by Market Size ===
- Major: KGO-AM San Francisco, Calif.
- Large: WLW-AM Cincinnati, Ohio
- Medium: WMT-AM Cedar Rapids, Iowa
- Small: KFGO Fargo, N.D.

=== Personalities of the Year by Market Size ===
- Major: Don Imus, WFAN-AM New York, N.Y.
- Large: Gerry House, WSIX-FM Nashville, Tenn.
- Medium: Van and Connie, WHO-AM Des Moines, Iowa
- Small: Wynne Speece, WNAX-AM Yankton, S.D.

=== Stations of the Year by Format ===
- AC/EZ: WSB-FM, Atlanta, Ga.
- AOR/Classic Rock: KSHE-FM St. Louis, Mo.
- Big Band/Nostalgia: WPEN-AM Philadelphia, Pa.
- Black/Urban: WVEE-FM Atlanta, Ga.
- CHR/Top 40: WBBM-FM Chicago, Ill.
- Classical: KDFC-AM/FM San Francisco, Calif.
- Country: WSIX-FM Nashville, Tenn.
- Jazz/New Age: KIFM San Diego, Calif.
- MOR: WCCO-AM Minneapolis, Minn.
- News/Talk: KGO-AM San Francisco, Calif.
- Oldies: KOOL-FM Phoenix, Ariz.
- Religious/Gospel: KNOM-AM, Nome, Alaska
- Spanish Language: KWKW-AM Los Angeles, Calif.

== Marconi Radio Awards for 1991 ==
=== Legendary Station ===
- KMOX-AM St. Louis, Mo.

=== Network/Syndicated Personality of the Year ===
- Paul Harvey, ABC Radio Networks

=== Stations of the Year by Market Size ===
- Major: WCCO-AM Minneapolis, Minn.
- Large: WHAS-AM Louisville, Ky.
- Medium: WHO-AM Des Moines, Iowa
- Small: KSPN-FM Aspen, Colo.

=== Personalities of the Year by Market Size ===
- Major: Mark and Brian, KLOS-FM Los Angeles, Calif.
- Large: Gary Burbank, WLW-AM Cincinnati, Ohio
- Medium: C.C. Ryder, KBFX-FM Anchorage, Alaska
- Small: Don Munson, WJBC-AM Bloomington, Ill.

=== Stations of the Year by Format ===
- AC/EZ: KOST-FM Los Angeles, Calif.
- AOR/Classic Rock: KLOS-FM Los Angeles, Calif.
- Big Band/Nostalgia: KFRC-AM San Francisco, Calif.
- Black/Urban: WRKS-FM New York, N.Y.
- CHR/Top 40: KIIS-AM/FM Los Angeles, Calif.
- Classical: WFMT-FM Chicago, Ill.
- Country: KNIX-FM Phoenix, Ariz.
- Jazz/New Age: WNUA-FM Chicago, Ill.
- MOR: WGN-AM Chicago, Ill.
- News/Talk: KABC-AM Los Angeles, Calif.
- Oldies: WCBS-FM New York, N.Y.
- Religious/Gospel: KAAY-AM Little Rock, Ark.
- Spanish Language: KCOR-AM San Antonio, Texas

== Marconi Radio Awards for 1990 ==
=== Legendary Station ===
- WGN-AM Chicago, Ill.

=== Network/Syndicated Personality of the Year ===
- Larry King, Mutual Broadcasting System

=== Stations of the Year by Market Size ===
- Major: KMOX-AM St. Louis, Mo.
- Large: WTIC-AM Hartford, Conn.
- Medium: KSSN-FM Little Rock, Ark.
- Small: WAXX-FM Eau Claire, Wis.

=== Personalities of the Year by Market Size ===
- Major: Don Imus, WFAN-AM New York, N.Y.
- Large: Gary Burbank, WLW-AM Cincinnati, Ohio
- Medium: Luther Massengill WDEF-AM/FM, Chattanooga, Tenn.
- Small: Bobby Owen, KEAN-AM/FM Abilene, Texas

=== Stations of the Year by Format ===
- AC/EZ: KOST-FM Los Angeles, Calif.
- AOR/Classic Rock: WLUP-FM Chicago, Ill.
- Big Band/Nostalgia: KFRC-AM San Francisco, Calif.
- Black/Urban: WVEE-FM Atlanta, Ga.
- CHR/Top 40: KIIS-FM Los Angeles, Calif.
- Classical: KING-FM Seattle, Wash.
- Country: KILT-FM Houston, Texas
- Jazz/New Age: WJZZ-FM Detroit, Mich.
- MOR Variety/Full Service: WGN-AM Chicago, Ill.
- News/Talk: KABC-AM Los Angeles, Calif.
- Oldies: WCBS-FM New York, N.Y.
- Religious/Gospel: WAOK-AM Atlanta, Ga.
- Spanish Language: WAQI-AM Miami, Fla.

== Marconi Radio Awards for 1989 ==
=== Legendary Station ===
- WLS-AM Chicago, Ill.

=== Network/Syndicated Personality of the Year ===
- Paul Harvey, ABC Radio Networks

=== Stations of the Year by Market Size ===
- Major: KNIX-AM/FM Phoenix, Ariz.
- Large: WIVK-AM/FM Knoxville, Tenn.
- Medium: WBBQ-AM/FM Augusta, Ga.
- Small: KBOZ-FM Bozeman, Mont.

=== Personalities of the Year by Market Size ===
- Major: Ron Chapman, KVIL-AM/FM Dallas, Texas
- Large: Bob Steele, WTIC-AM Hartford, Conn.
- Medium: Mark Summers, WBBQ-AM/FM Augusta, Ga.
- Small: Billie Oakley, KMA-AM Shenandoah, Iowa

=== Stations of the Year by Format ===
- AC/Soft Rock/Oldies: KVIL-AM/FM Dallas, Texas
- AOR/Classic Rock: WMMR-FM Philadelphia, Pa.
- Big Band/Nostalgia: KMPC-AM Los Angeles, Calif.
- Black/Urban: WVAZ-FM Chicago, Ill/
- CHR/Top 40: KPWR-FM Los Angeles, Calif.
- Classical: WQXR-FM New York, N.Y.
- Country: KNIX-AM/FM Phoenix, Ariz.
- EZ Listening/Beautiful Music: KABL-AM/FM San Francisco, Calif.
- Jazz/New Age: KTWV-FM Los Angeles, Calif.
- MOR/Variety: WGN-AM Chicago, Ill.
- News/Talk: KMOX-AM St. Louis, Mo.
- Religious/Gospel: KLTY-FM Dallas, Texas
- Spanish Language: WQBA-AM/FM Miami, Fla.

== See also ==
- Marconi Prize
- List of radio awards
