= TexAgs =

Texas A&M University fan website

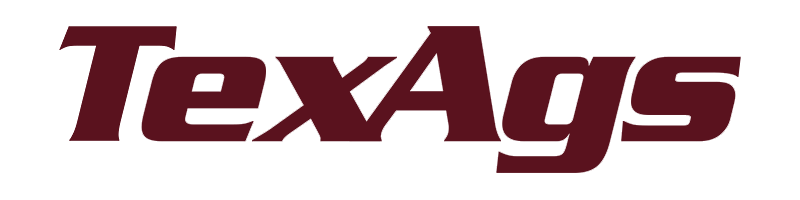
- Website type: Online community
- Available in: English
- Owners: Maroon & White, LP.
- Creator: Peter Kuo
- Website: www.texags.com
- Commercial: Mixed
- Registration: Optional
- Launched: July 22, 1998; 28 years ago
- Current status: Active

TexAgs is an independent Texas A&M University fan website. It features articles, chat, forums, and recruiting information about Texas A&M Aggie sports. The website receives an average of 32.6 million pageviews per month. as of June 2008, TexAgs was the sixth most-visited college sports website and the most visited NCAA Division I-A website. During the 2012 college football season, the website received an average of 500,000 monthly unique visitors.

== History ==
TexAgs was created by Peter Kuo in May 1997. Just over two years later, in December 1999, it was sold to Brandon Jones and Josh Oelze. The two began partnering with Billy Liucci's Maroon & White Report in 2002 before merging in 2008. All three remain on the four-person executive team, alongside former NFL player Hunter Goodwin as chairman of the board.

When it debuted, TexAgs only had 2-3,000 members, and forums only discussed Aggie football. In February 2007, The Association of Former Students announced a marketing partnership with TexAgs.com. As of 2007, there were more than 60,000 accounts. The website never used any form of advertising for promotion, as it grew popular via word of mouth. As of 2013, there were over 9,500 paying subscribers, and the website presently includes over 50 different forums.

Notable forum posts include one that disclosed that former University of Oklahoma quarterback Rhett Bomar received payment for non-worked hours from a local auto dealership seven months before the University kicked the player off of the team and reported the infraction to the NCAA. Former University President and former U.S. Secretary of Defense Robert Gates has posted as "Ranger65". In April 2010, TexAgs gained national attention when a forum member posting as "dermdoc" posted of terminating an employee because of increased costs due to Obamacare. The employee happened to have voted for President Barack Obama. Texas A&M graduate and US Astronaut Mike Fossum posted late on July 29, 2011 from the International Space Station using an account TexAgs staff set up for him earlier that day.

In 2009, the website became an affiliate of ESPN.com as part of the 20 college TEAM Sports Network, but that relationship has since ended. On August 22, 2011, TexAgs radio was launched as a daily Aggie sports talk show on KZNE 1150 The Zone. The show airs for three hours on weekdays and includes a one-hour TV show simulcast. Hosts include David Nuño, Billy Liucci, and Olin Buchanan.

=== Controversy with Mike Elko ===
During the 2026 football season, the Texas A&M football team experienced three in-conference losses against University of Kentucky, Louisiana State University, and University of Missouri. In October 2026, after the loss against Missouri, head coach Mike Elko critized TexAgs in the post-game press conference. "There's a difference to me between the fan base and social media," he stated. "So there's one group that I really don't care much about. Billy [Liucci]'s cesspool can go be Billy's cesspool. Our fan base, stay with us, be behind us."

The backlash was immense and received national attention. In a statement to The New York Times, Liucci stated that, “It was just (the) wrong time and wrong audience to be saying that to, the way the season is going. It’s never a time to call out the fans, especially when it’s a large, loyal portion of your fanbase."

Several days later, Elko apologized for his comments. "In the heat of the moment, I think I answered a question in a way I certainly regret," Elko stated. "I think everybody knows I have a tremendous relationship with Billy...There's nothing about Billy and I that has ever been off since 2018."

== See also ==
- List of Internet forums
