= WJMZ-FM =

- Anderson, South Carolina; United States
- Broadcast area: The Upstate
- Frequency: 107.3 MHz (HD Radio)
- Branding: 107.3 JAMZ

Programming
- Format: Urban adult contemporary
- Subchannels: HD2: X98.5 (alternative rock); HD3: Star 99.5 (adult contemporary); HD4: Simulcast of WHZT

Ownership
- Owner: SummitMedia; (SM-WJMZ, LLC)
- Sister stations: WHZT

History
- First air date: August 1, 1963
- Former call signs: WANS-FM (1963–1991); WWMM (1991–1993)
- Call sign meaning: "Jamz"

Technical information
- Licensing authority: FCC
- Facility ID: 1303
- Class: C0
- ERP: 100,000 watts
- HAAT: 308 meters (1,010 ft)
- Transmitter coordinates: 34°42′7″N 82°36′19″W
- Translator: See § HD radio

Links
- Public license information: Public file; LMS
- Webcast: Listen live; HD2: Listen live; HD3: Listen live; HD4: Listen live
- Website: 1073jamz.com; HD2: www.x985fm.com; HD3: www.star995.fm; HD4: www.hot981.com

WJMZ-FM (107.3 MHz) is a commercial radio station licensed to Anderson, South Carolina and serving the Upstate South Carolina region, including Greenville and Spartanburg. The station is owned by SummitMedia and airs an urban adult contemporary radio format. It is among the highest rated stations in the Greenville–Spartanburg radio market, according to Nielsen ratings.

WJMZ is licensed by the Federal Communications Commission (FCC) to broadcast with an effective radiated power (ERP) of 100,000 watts with a tower at 1,010 feet height above average terrain (HAAT). Its studios are located at Noma Square in Downtown Greenville, and its transmitter is located off Massey Road in Pendleton.

== History ==
The station began as WANS-FM on October 24, 1967, the FM sister station to WANS (1280 AM). They broadcast out of studios in Anderson on Clemson Boulevard. WANS-AM-FM were highly rated Top 40 radio stations through the 1960s, 1970s, and 1980s with the AM station eventually switching to oldies music, while the FM continued playing the hits. After being a top 40 powerhouse for many years, owner Radio Anderson sold them to Degree Communications, run by Kent Burkhart, a radio consultant in Atlanta, in 1988. The new owner cut staff, promotions and other costs. The AM once again simulcast the FM station. Ratings dropped in a drastically.

By 1990, the station was bankrupt. WANS-FM flipped from top 40 to adult contemporary-formatted WWMM as "Magic 107.3" on February 1, 1991, after the station was sold to Desert Communications for $3 million. In 1994, due to low ratings and facing competition from WMYI and WSPA-FM, the adult contemporary format was dropped. WWMM changed its format and call sign to urban contemporary as "107.3 JAMZ", WJMZ-FM.

In 1995, AmCom Carolinas Inc. sold WJMZ to WROQ owner ABS Communications Inc., for $5.3 million. ABS immediately took over WJMZ in a local marketing agreement. In 2001, the station was sold to Cox Media Group, a major radio, TV and newspaper owner based in Atlanta.

WJMZ carried the station slogan, "The Peoples' Station" until 2003, when it changed to "Today's R&B". In 2009, WJMZ-FM earned a Marconi Award as Urban Station of the Year from the National Association of Broadcasters. In 2010, disc jockey Kelly Mac won the Marconi Award for Medium Market Personality of the Year.

On July 20, 2012, Cox Radio, Inc. announced the sale of WJMZ-FM and 22 other stations to Summit Media LLC for $66.25 million. The sale was consummated on May 3, 2013.

== HD Radio ==
WJMZ-FM HD2 broadcasts an alternative rock format branded as X98.5 (relayed on FM translator W253BG 98.5 FM Arial).

WJMZ-FM HD3 broadcast an urban contemporary format branded as Streetz 99.5 (relayed on FM translator W258CB 99.5 FM Greenville) until late 2024, when it switched to Christmas music as Star 99.5. On December 26, 2024, the station changed to adult contemporary.

WJMZ-FM HD4 simulcasts sister station WHZT in order to increase its coverage area in Spartanburg County (relayed on FM translator W231BA 94.1 FM Spartanburg)

Broadcast translators for WJMZ-FM
Call sign	Frequency	City of license	FID	ERP (W)	Class	FCC info	Notes
W231BA	94.1 FM	Spartanburg, South Carolina	156208	250	D	LMS	Relays HD4 (simulcasts WHZT)
W258CB	99.5 FM	Greenville, South Carolina	156241	250	D	LMS	Relays HD3, "Star 99.5"
W253BG	98.5 FM	Arial, South Carolina	156113	200	D	LMS	Relays HD2, "X-98.5" (formerly simulcast WHZT)
