= Air Academy High School =

Public high school in Colorado Springs, Colorado, U.S.

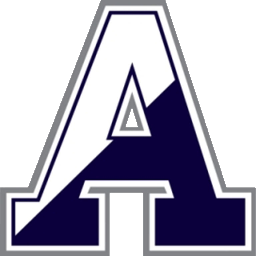

Location
- 6910 Carlton Drive; Air Force Academy, Colorado 80840; United States; 38°58′8″N 104°50′46″W

Information
- School type: Public high school
- Established: 1957 (69 years ago)
- School district: Academy 20
- CEEB code: 060266
- NCES School ID: 080192000002
- Principal: Amy Ripperger
- Teaching staff: 78.80 (on an FTE basis)
- Grades: 9–12
- Years taught: 9-12
- Enrollment: 1,315 (2023–2024)
- Student to teacher ratio: 16.69
- Colors: Silver and blue
- Athletics conference: CHSAA
- Mascot: Kadet (Baby falcon)
- Nickname: Kadets (after the nearby United States Air Force Academy Cadets)
- Yearbook: Vapor Trails
- Feeder schools: Eagleview Middle School
- Website: airacademy.asd20.org

Air Academy High School (AAHS) is a public high school in El Paso County, Colorado, United States that serves the northwestern end of Colorado Springs, Colorado, as well as the United States Air Force Academy. Air Academy is a part of Academy School District 20, and was built in 1957, effectively making it the oldest school in the district. It is the only high school in the U.S. built on a military academy (the school district also has an elementary school on the Air Force Academy). The school received a bond measure in 2024 from the Department of Defense to rebuild Air Academy, which will raise $83.14 million from taxpayers and the Department of Defense will provide an 80% match, creating a total of $240 million. This measure was passed in 2024 and is tentatively expected to be built in Fall 2028.

Air Academy is situated in the foothills of the Front Range, at an approximate elevation of 6,550 feet (1,995 m) above sea level.

== Academics ==
AAHS offers 21 Advanced Placement classes to students in numerous subject areas. Air Academy is well-known for its engineering program which follows the Project Lead the Way (PLTW) course.

== Athletics ==
Air Academy offers varsity and junior varsity athletic teams competing in Colorado High School Activities Association 4A and 5A sporting events. Facilities at the school include two gyms, a weights facility, a track, a yoga and fitness room, soccer, baseball, and softball field, six tennis courts, and an outdoor football/soccer stadium (aka the K-Dome). Bill Mondt coached Kadet football to a state football championship in 1962; he went on to be head coach at New Mexico University and later coached successfully at Eaton CO High School Gary Barnett was the head football coach at AAHS in the 1970s; he was later the head coach at Northwestern (1992–1998) and Colorado (1999–2005). Air Academy Boys' Soccer most recently won Colorado CHSAA state finals in their 2024 fall season with a record of 16-1-2 coached by head coach Espen Hosoien with 6 other state titles, their last being in 2018. The Air Academy football team is currently coached by former NCAA coach Waymond Jackson II, who notably coached under Steve Spurrier between 2007 and 2013.

== Notable alumni ==
- Gregg Brandon, football coach
- Donald Cerrone, retired professional mixed martial artist
- Ted Harvey, politician
- Katie Rainsberger, professional long-distance runner
- Pat Rice, former MLB player (Seattle Mariners) and pitching coach
- Eric Franklin Rosser, former keyboardist for John Mellencamp
- Dave Ryan (radio), stage name of two time Marconi award winning morning radio host David Kibler (class of '80) at KDWB-FM

== See also ==
- Academy School District 20
