= Dave Ryan (radio) =

Radio presenter and author

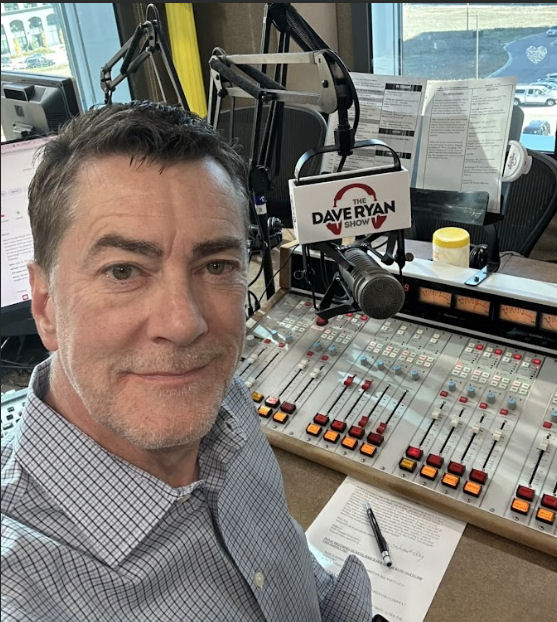
- Dave Ryan in his studio at KDWB-FM in 2024
- Born: David Kibler; October 24, 1962 (age 63)
- Education: Pikes Peak State College
- Years active: 1986–2026
- Website: kdwb.iheart.com/featured/dave-ryan/

David Kibler, known professionally as Dave Ryan, is an American former radio presenter. He was host of the Dave Ryan in the Morning show on KDWB-FM in the Minneapolis-St. Paul metro area in the US state of Minnesota. He has twice been the recipient of the Marconi Radio Award for large market personality of the year, in 2011 and 2023. Ryan retired from on air broadcast duties with his last show airing on May 22, 2026.

At the age of 21, Ryan hosted his own morning show at KLUC-FM in Las Vegas. During his career he has previously hosted shows at KKFR in Phoenix, WNCI and KZZP. In addition to his radio show Ryan, works as a media consultant and is a published author. Take A Shower, Show Up On Time and Don't Steal Anything is a light hearted work providing anecdotes and advice. Little Dave's Amazing Day is a children's book inspired by his own life.

== Early life ==
Ryan grew up in Black Forest, Colorado. He is a graduate of Air Academy High School (class of 1980), and earned an associate degree from Pikes Peak State College.

== Publicity stunts ==
To mark the 50th anniversary of its completion, Ryan rode his skateboard across Hoover Dam 50 times while a DJ at KLUC in 1986.

In 2000 Ryan sat in every seat at the just completed Xcel Energy Center in St Paul, MN.

In July 2002, Clear Channel Outdoor paid for twelve billboards in the Twin Cities area featuring headshot photos of a boy and a girl with the label "ugly kids". The billboards were up for four weeks, and speculation on their intent included potential advertisements for children's dental care. On August 1, 2002, the billboards were changed to read "Ugly kids ... become DJs. Dave Ryan in the morning 5-9 a.m." and featured the adult photos of Ryan and his then co-host Angi Taylor. The ad campaign caused the Minnesota Department of Transportation to request the billboards' removal due to disrupting traffic. Despite that, the format was copied in 2005 in Salt Lake Valley, where the ads were placed initially by Reagan Outdoor Advertising, then removed due to complaints, before being placed again by Compass Outdoor.

=== Controversies ===
For two days prior to the October 10, 2003 Michigan Wolverines vs. Minnesota Golden Gophers football game, Ryan made comments on his show stating that he would give away free KDWB tee shirts to rioters. This was in the wake of the 2002 riots after the NCAA hockey championship, and riots that followed the Minnesota State University, Mankato loss to North Dakota State University on October 3, 2003. Mark Rotenberg, general counsel for the University of Minnesota, contacted KDWB, who issued an apology and broadcast public service announcements regarding potential legal consequences for rioters.

On March 22, 2011, Ryan's co-host Steve Latart performed a song that was labeled as a parody on the Dave Ryan in the Morning show. The song, titled "30 Hmongs in a House", was set to the tune of "Tears in Heaven", which played in the background. KDWB's initial Facebook apology, reported as "more defensive than contrite", received criticism from both the Asian American Journalists Association and from Hmong author Kao Kalia Yang. The song's content resulted in HealthPartners removing their advertising from KDWB as well as a protest called Rally Against Racism that was organized by TakeAction Minnesota involving 200 members of the local Hmong community and their allies.

== Bibliography ==
- Ryan, Dave; Cannon, Kevin (May 22, 2015). Take A Shower, Show Up On Time and Don't Steal Anything: And Other Sh*t I Learned the Hard Way. Wise Ink Creative Publishing. ISBN 9781940014586.
- Ryan, Dave; Palmer, Sheri (March 5, 2024). Little Dave's Amazing Day. Wise Ink Creative Publishing. ISBN 9781634896948.
