= Van & Bonnie =

American radio program

Van & Bonnie in the Morning, colloquially simply Van & Bonnie, was an American radio program, airing weekday mornings from 4:59 am to 9 am on WHO (1040 AM) in Des Moines, Iowa. Since August 1994, the show has been hosted by Van Harden and Bonnie Lucas. The hosts were named "Medium Market Personalities of the Year" at the National Association of Broadcasters Marconi Radio Awards in 2007 and 2009.

Van is from Adel, Iowa, and Bonnie is from Monroe, Iowa. Bonnie retired on March 6, 2020.
