= Kelly Mac =

American radio personality

Kelly Mac is an American radio show host. She has been the mid-day show host and music director for WBAV-FM in Charlotte, North Carolina, since July 2017. In 2010, Mac was honored by the National Association of Broadcasters with the Marconi award for Radio Personality of the Year at WJMZ-FM.
