= WHZT =

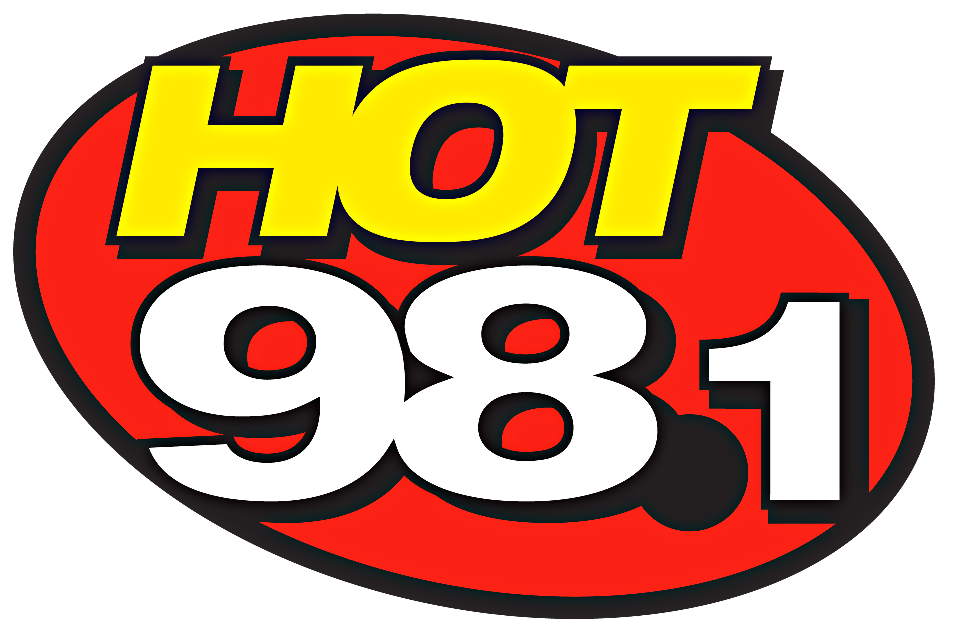
- Williamston, South Carolina; United States
- Broadcast area: Greenville–Spartanburg and The Upstate
- Frequency: 98.1 MHz
- Branding: Hot 98.1

Programming
- Format: Rhythmic contemporary

Ownership
- Owner: SummitMedia; (SM-WHZT, LLC)
- Sister stations: WJMZ-FM

History
- First air date: June 6, 1953
- Former call signs: WSNW-FM (1953–1965); WBFM (1953–1995); WPEK (1995–2001)
- Call sign meaning: "Hot"

Technical information
- Licensing authority: FCC
- Facility ID: 5971
- Class: C0
- ERP: 100,000 watts
- HAAT: 304 meters (997 ft)
- Transmitter coordinates: 34°41′15.00″N 82°59′13.00″W
- Translators: 94.1 W231BA (Spartanburg); 106.5 W293BX (Highlands, North Carolina)
- Repeater: (107.3-4) WJMZ-HD4 (Anderson)

Links
- Public license information: Public file; LMS
- Webcast: Listen live
- Website: hot981.com

WHZT (98.1 FM) is a commercial radio station licensed to Williamston, South Carolina, United States, and serving Upstate South Carolina, including Greenville and Spartanburg. Owned by SummitMedia, it features a rhythmic contemporary format branded "HOT 98.1", with studios located at Noma Square in Downtown Greenville.

WHZT's transmitter is sited North Radio Station Road in Seneca, South Carolina.

== History ==
On June 6, 1953, the station signed on as WBFM. It was a middle of the road and adult standards outlet, airing some of the same programming as sister station WSNW 1150 AM in Seneca, South Carolina. The station continued with the same format until the mid-1990s, even after a power increase to 100,000 watts. The station played oldies for a while and then Triple-A.

Prior to its flip to Rhythmic Top 40 in the spring of 2001, WHZT's previous format was News/Talk/Sports as WPEK ("98.1 The Peak"). WPEK was sold to Cathy Hughes (Radio One) in the fall of 2000 and then sold in late January 2001 to Cox Broadcasting. An agreement was reportedly reached between new station ownership and then affiliate network content provider, Westwood One, which distributed nationally syndicated talk shows to WPEK such as G. Gordon Liddy, Dr. Joy Browne, and the Don & Mike Show, to keep network programming running until February 16, 2001, to facilitate a smoother format transition. However, on February 1, 2001, the Don & Mike Show, which, just 3 days earlier, had again been rated No. 1 (Arbitron) in the "afternoon drive" time slot, was cut short at 5p.m. after the show's hosts discovered that WPEK had been sold to Cox Broadcasting and began discussing the upcoming format flip on air and taking calls from upset station listeners. New ownership briefly aired national sports talk programming during this interim period, with a flip to Top 40 all-music format still the eventual goal. But in the week prior to the flip it stunted, and in the process kept listeners guessing, with a Modern AC format as "Q98". On April 1, 2001, Q98 became The New Hot 98-1. The first song was "Party Up" by DMX and continued with 10,000 songs in a row commercial free. Hot 98.1 served as 'companion' to its Adult R&B sister WJMZ-FM, who had been the R&B/Hip-Hop outlet in the region before segueing into their current direction in 2002.

In September 2007, 98.1 "re-launched" with a promotion called "Pay Your Bills" after being "dead" for several days prior, the dead term referring to being "dead serious about giving away free money." This was met with much fanfare on the air as they also launched a freshened image with new voice talent and jingles, the first change of its kind since the station's 2001 launch. The re-launch paid off as WHZT rocketed to the number one position in their highly competitive target demographic, according to the Fall 2007 Arbitron survey. On March 18, 2008, the station announced that "Pay Your Bills" would be returning.

On July 20, 2012, Cox Radio, Inc. announced the sale of WHZT and 22 other stations to SummitMedia LLC for $66.25 million. The sale was consummated on May 3, 2013.

Since the purchase of WHZT by SummitMedia, the station changed its slogan to "Carolina's Party Station", then to its current “The Hip Hop Station”. The station identifies as a hip hop station on air, but continues to report as a Rhythmic Contemporary station. Its primary competition is Urban translator "96.3 The Block" and CHR WFBC “B93.7”, both owned by Audacy.

== Signal and translator ==
98.1 WHZT can be heard as far south and west as the northeastern suburbs of the Atlanta metro area, and as far east as the Spartanburg area. In parts of, and specifically east of the Spartanburg area, it becomes more difficult to receive WHZT due to interference from neighboring 97.9 WPEG in Charlotte. The station had a construction permit in 2006 to move its signal to an antenna closer to the metro in nearby Anderson, South Carolina. To improve its Spartanburg coverage, a translator of Hot 98.1 was added at 94.1 FM (W231BA) in late 2009, located in eastern Spartanburg county on the WLTS tower. The Hot 98.1 programming is fed via WJMZ-FM's HD4 signal.
