= W258CB =

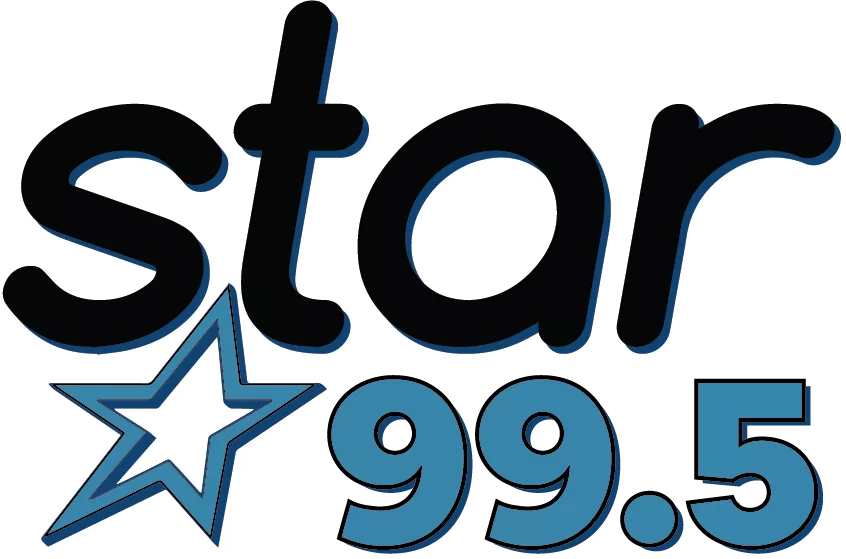
- Greenville, South Carolina; United States
- Broadcast area: Upstate South Carolina
- Frequency: 99.5 MHz
- Branding: Star 99.5

Programming
- Format: Adult contemporary

Ownership
- Owner: Tower Above Media; (Tower Above Media LLC)
- Operator: SummitMedia

History
- First air date: December 13, 2007
- Former call signs: W249CB (2004–2016)
- Former frequencies: 97.7 MHz (2007–2016)

Technical information
- Licensing authority: FCC
- Facility ID: 156241
- Class: D
- ERP: 220 watts
- HAAT: 333 meters (1,093 ft)
- Transmitter coordinates: 34.9352°N 82.4051°W
- Repeater: 107.3 WJMZ-HD3

Links
- Public license information: Public file; LMS
- Webcast: Listen Live
- Website: star995.fm

W258CB (99.5 FM) is a radio station translator in Greenville, South Carolina. Owned by Tower Above Media, and operated by SummitMedia, the station simulcasts an adult contemporary music format branded as Star 99.5 from an HD Radio subchannel of SummitMedia's WJMZ-FM.

== History ==
W258CB began broadcasting at 97.7 FM as W249CB in December 2007 in Six Mile, re-broadcasting WLFJ-FM HD-3, which in turn was a simulcast of WHRZ-LP in Spartanburg, which carried a Christian Contemporary format. In August 2011, the station filed an application to move to Paris Mountain in Greenville, with an upgrade from 190 watts to 250 watts, allowing the station to cover Greenville County, as well as portions of neighboring Pickens and Spartanburg counties. The new location and stronger signal gave the station an impressive coverage area for a translator, helped by the location of the antenna on a mountain. After the request was granted, construction began on the new transmitter site in Greenville. The move was made official in early 2012.

On December 16, 2011, the station began operating from the new site under a construction permit. The religious format, however, did not move with the signal; on that day, 97.7 FM signed on with a variety hits format known as 97.7 Chuck FM, simulcast from an HD Radio subchannel of Cox Media Group-owned WJMZ-FM.

On July 20, 2012, Cox Radio announced the sale of its mid-market stations, including WJMZ and its lease of W249CB, to SummitMedia $66.25 million. The sale was consummated on May 3, 2013.

On August 19, 2016, the translator moved to 99.5 FM. The translator changed its call sign to W258CB on August 30, 2016. On December 27, 2017, the station relaunched under the Jack FM brand, with no change in format.

On June 1, 2021, W258CB shifted to classic hits, and rebranded as Awesome 99.5.

On April 28, 2023, at 3 p.m., after signing off the "Awesome" format with an hour of songs themed around departure in some fashion (ending with "End of the Road" by Boyz II Men), the station flipped to urban contemporary as "Streetz 99.5", launching with "Players" by Coi Leray. The format was to serve as a flanker for sister station WHZT against, most notably, Audacy's "The Block" translator trimulcast in the market.

On November 29, 2024, the station dropped the “Streetz” branding and Urban Contemporary format for Christmas music, branded as “Star 99.5” with the syndicated Murphy, Sam, and Jodi morning show. Patterned after sister station KSRZ, the station segued to an adult contemporary format after the Christmas holiday at midnight on 12/26, filling the void left by WSPA-FM’s sale and subsequent flip to a Regional Mexican format in April 2024. The station’s positioner is “The ‘80s to Now.”
