= Arial, South Carolina =

- CDP
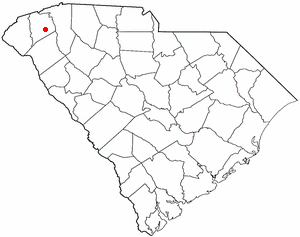
- Location of Arial, South Carolina
- Coordinates: 34°50′49″N 82°37′48″W
- Country: United States
- State: South Carolina
- County: Pickens

Area
  - Total: 4.59 sq mi (11.89 km^{2})
  - Land: 4.58 sq mi (11.85 km^{2})
  - Water: 0.015 sq mi (0.04 km^{2})
- Elevation: 991 ft (302 m)

Population (2020)
  - Total: 2,729
  - Density: 596.5/sq mi (230.32/km^{2})
- Time zone: UTC-5 (Eastern (EST))
  - Summer (DST): UTC-4 (EDT)
- FIPS code: 45-02440
- GNIS feature ID: 2402651

Arial is a census-designated place (CDP) in Pickens County, South Carolina, United States. The population was 2,607 at the 2000 census. It is part of the Greenville–Mauldin–Easley Metropolitan Statistical Area.

== Geography ==
According to the United States Census Bureau, the CDP has a total area of 4.9 square miles (13 km^{2}), all of it land.

== Demographics ==
Historical population
Census	Pop.	Note	%±
2020	2,729		—
U.S. Decennial Census

=== 2020 census ===
As of the 2020 census, Arial had a population of 2,729. The median age was 41.9 years. 22.2% of residents were under the age of 18 and 18.5% of residents were 65 years of age or older. For every 100 females there were 99.5 males, and for every 100 females age 18 and over there were 96.9 males age 18 and over.

79.8% of residents lived in urban areas, while 20.2% lived in rural areas.

There were 1,076 households in Arial, of which 29.3% had children under the age of 18 living in them. Of all households, 48.0% were married-couple households, 18.9% were households with a male householder and no spouse or partner present, and 24.1% were households with a female householder and no spouse or partner present. About 25.5% of all households were made up of individuals and 11.5% had someone living alone who was 65 years of age or older.

There were 1,222 housing units, of which 11.9% were vacant. The homeowner vacancy rate was 0.7% and the rental vacancy rate was 6.9%.

Racial composition as of the 2020 census
Race	Number	Percent
White	2,250	82.4%
Black or African American	123	4.5%
American Indian and Alaska Native	17	0.6%
Asian	12	0.4%
Native Hawaiian and Other Pacific Islander	0	0.0%
Some other race	122	4.5%
Two or more races	205	7.5%
Hispanic or Latino (of any race)	220	8.1%

=== 2000 census ===
As of the census of 2000, there were 2,607 people, 1,068 households, and 759 families residing in the CDP. The population density was 527.8 inhabitants per square mile (203.8/km^{2}). There were 1,179 housing units at an average density of 238.7 per square mile (92.2/km^{2}). The racial makeup of the CDP was 93.82% White, 4.18% African American, 0.08% Native American, 0.15% Asian, 0.96% from other races, and 0.81% from two or more races. Hispanic or Latino of any race were 1.88% of the population.

There were 1,068 households, out of which 28.7% had children under the age of 18 living with them, 56.6% were married couples living together, 8.7% had a female householder with no husband present, and 28.9% were non-families. 25.4% of all households were made up of individuals, and 10.8% had someone living alone who was 65 years of age or older. The average household size was 2.44 and the average family size was 2.89.

In the CDP, the population was spread out, with 23.3% under the age of 18, 9.7% from 18 to 24, 28.0% from 25 to 44, 24.3% from 45 to 64, and 14.7% who were 65 years of age or older. The median age was 37 years. For every 100 females, there were 96.3 males. For every 100 females age 18 and over, there were 94.6 males.

The median income for a household in the CDP was $29,240, and the median income for a family was $36,445. Males had a median income of $29,219 versus $20,511 for females. The per capita income for the CDP was $17,646. About 6.0% of families and 10.8% of the population were below the poverty line, including 7.1% of those under age 18 and 11.3% of those age 65 or over.
