= KWBC =

- College Station, Texas; United States
- Frequency: 1550 kHz
- Branding: Willy 1550 AM & 98.7 FM

Programming
- Format: Classic country
- Affiliations: Westwood One

Ownership
- Owner: Bryan Broadcasting License Corporation

History
- First air date: January 4, 1961; 65 years ago
- Call sign meaning: Whitten Broadcasting Company (original owners)

Technical information
- Licensing authority: FCC
- Facility ID: 40912
- Class: D
- Power: 1,500 watts (daytime); 45 watts (nighttime)
- Transmitter coordinates: 1550: 30°37′55″N 96°21′29″W; 98.7: 30°22′47″N 96°6′0.00″W
- Translators: K254DA (98.7 MHz, Navasota)

Links
- Public license information: Public file; LMS
- Webcast: Listen Live
- Website: www.navasotanews.com

KWBC (1550 AM, 98.7 FM; Willy 1550 & 98.7) is an American broadcast radio station, licensed to College Station, Texas and owned by Bryan Broadcasting License Corporation. It is an affiliate of the Texas State Network. The station's studios are located in College Station and its transmitter is in Bryan.

== History ==
KWBC was initially proposed by J.G. and R.H. Whitten, under the corporate name of Whitten Broadcasting Company, Inc. of Navasota in December 1958. The facility was granted a construction permit on May 11, 1960 by the Federal Communications Commission to build a 250 watt daytime only broadcast transmission tower at the intersection of Taft St. and People St., operating at 1550 kilocycles, with a studio location at 116 Railroad St. in Navasota. The Whittens requested the callsign KWBC, standing for the Whitten Broadcasting Company. The callsign was granted by the Federal Communications Commission on May 26, 1960.

The facility was constructed and received a License to Cover on January 4, 1961. Merl Saxon, of Lufkin, Texas, served as the engineer.

KWBC was purchased by Bryan Broadcasting Corporation on August 16, 2007. After nearly 50 years of operating in Navasota itself, KWBC was granted a Minor Modification to move the AM transmission site to Bryan-College Station on July 30, 2012. The facility was relocated north, licensed to College Station, but continued to focus the programming of KWBC for Navasota as "Navasota News 1550".

After the move north, KWBC's signal had some difficulty reaching the former Community of License during daytime hours, and was non-existent at night. This was rectified by constructing an FM translator for KWBC in Navasota itself, operating from the former AM tower site, as 98.7 K254DA. The Navasota licensed translator was granted a License to Cover on February 6, 2018.
