= KNDE =

Radio station in College Station, Texas

Coordinates: 30.688°N 96.426°W

- College Station, Texas; United States
- Broadcast area: Bryan-College Station
- Frequency: 95.1 MHz (HD Radio)
- Branding: Candy 95

Programming
- Format: Top 40 (CHR)
- Subchannels: HD2: Classic country "Willy 97.7"; HD3: Regional Mexican "La Jefa 102.7"

Ownership
- Owner: Bryan Broadcasting Corporation; (Bryan Broadcasting License Corporation)

History
- First air date: August 8, 1964 (as WTAW-FM at 92.1)
- Former call signs: WTAW-FM (1964–1982); KTAW (1982–1987); KTSR (1987–2003)
- Former frequencies: 92.1 MHz (1964–2003)
- Call sign meaning: the callsign sounds like the word Candy

Technical information
- Licensing authority: FCC
- Facility ID: 7631
- Class: C2
- ERP: 38,000 watts
- HAAT: 171 m (561 ft)
- Translators: 97.7 K249ET (College Station, relays HD2); 102.7 K274CM (College Station, relays HD3)

Links
- Public license information: Public file; LMS
- Webcast: Listen Live (HD1); Listen Live (HD2); Listen Live (HD3)
- Website: candy95.com willy977.com (HD2) lajefa1027.com (HD3)

KNDE (95.1 FM) is a radio station with a Top 40 (CHR) format licensed to College Station, Texas.

Candy 95's current line-up features "Morning Candy" with Ted and Mikaylee (6-10am), mid-day with Ryan Star (10am-3pm), afternoons with Rob Mack (2-6pm), and Liveline with Mason evenings (6-11). It is owned and operated by Bryan Broadcasting Company through its licensee Bryan Broadcasting License Corporation, based locally in College Station, Texas. Its studios are in College Station and its transmitter is in Bryan.

== History ==
The station began broadcasting on August 8, 1964 as WTAW-FM on 92.1 FM. The station was originally a Top 40/CHR station known as "92W", and was once the dominant CHR station for the College Station area until the launch of KKYS in November 1984. In 1982, the station's call-letters were changed to KTAW-FM, and in 1987, the station started to slowly downgrade its Top 40 format for adult contemporary and changed its call-letters to KTSR. It was known as "Star 92". This lasted until 1991 as the station then flipped to classic rock. Its format would later shift to mainstream rock by the 2000s as "92 Rock".

On March 1, 2003, KTSR moved from 92.1 (where it operated with 3,000 watts) to 95.1, with a much larger 38,000 watt signal. Concurrently, the call letters changed to KNDE ("Candy") and the format to Hot AC. The station eventually moved to CHR. Some former programs include The Morning Zoo with Mason and Mack, Lesley K in middays, Jerry Kidd in the afternoons, Tripp Daily at night, and Frito & Katy, who are now at KILT-FM in Houston.

=== Former logos ===
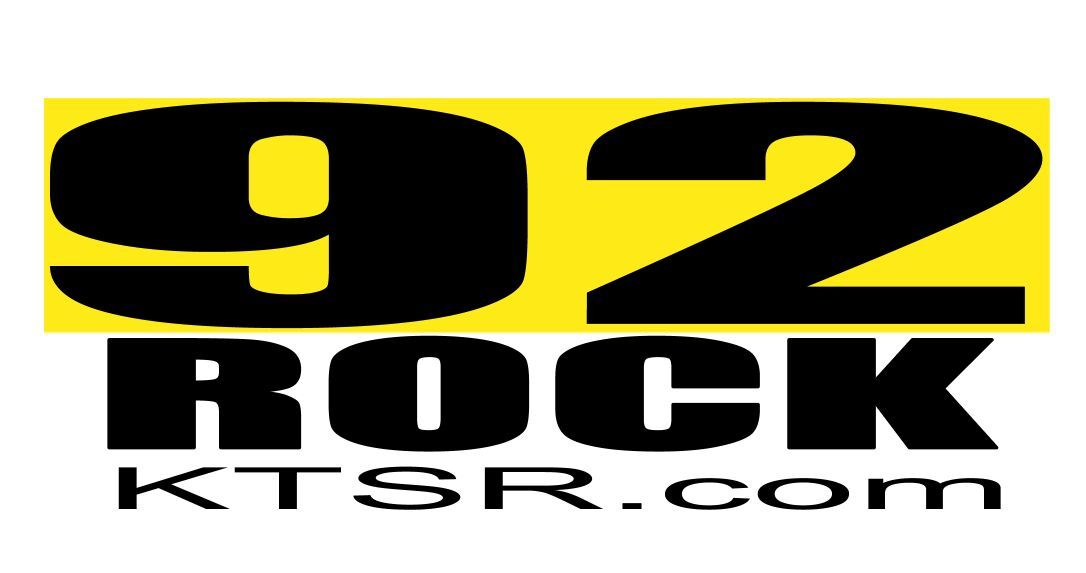

=== Former DJs ===
- Krash
- Elizabethany
- Bobby Mason
- Scotty Mack
- Bo-Bo the Monkey Boy
- Lesley K
- Tripp Daily
- Jerry Kidd
- Tic-Tac
- Maddie
- Brad Mitchell
- Mike Retro
- Lindsey Hall
- Adam Knight
- Ebony Williams
- Rick Lavere
- Nick J

== HD Radio ==
In 2009, KNDE began broadcasting in HD with side channels. The HD1 rebroadcasts the analog signal of KNDE.

=== KNDE-HD2 ===
KNDE-HD2 airs 80's and 90's classic country on "Willy 97.7."

=== KNDE-HD3 ===
KNDE-HD3 airs a Regional Mexican format known as "La Jefa 102.7".
