= KPWJ =

KPWJ and KKEE

KPWJ: Kurten, Texas; KKEE: Centerville, Texas; United States
- Broadcast area: KPWJ: Bryan–College Station metropolitan area; KKEE: Madisonville, Buffalo
- Frequencies: KPWJ: 107.7 MHz; KKEE: 101.3 MHz
- Branding: Peace 107.7

Programming
- Format: Contemporary Christian Music

Ownership
- Owner: Bryan Broadcasting License Corporation

History
- First air date: KPWJ: April 6, 2010; KKEE: January 11, 2017
- Call sign meaning: KPWJ: Know Peace With Jesus

Technical information
- Licensing authority: FCC
- Facility ID: KPWJ: 166036; KKEE: 191507
- Class: KPWJ: A; KKEE: A
- ERP: KPWJ: 3,500 watts; KKEE: 5,200 watts
- HAAT: KPWJ: 100 meters (330 ft); KKEE: 75.8 meters (249 ft)
- Transmitter coordinates: KPWJ: 30°37′12″N 96°15′13″W; KKEE: 31°14′36″N 95°58′40″W

Links
- Public license information: KPWJ: Public file; LMS; KKEE: Public file; LMS
- Webcast: KPWJ: Listen live KKEE: Listen live
- Website: KPWJ: peace107.com; KKEE: peace1013.com

KPWJ and KKEE (107.7 FM, 101.3 FM) are a pair of radio stations airing a simulcasted Contemporary Christian Music format, licensed to Kurten, Texas, and Centerville, Texas respectively. The combined stations serve the Bryan – College Station metropolitan area as well as Madisonville, Buffalo, Jewett and points east of Bryan-College Station, and are owned by Bryan Broadcasting License Corporation. The station's studios are located in College Station and the respective transmitters are in College Station and Centerville.

== History ==
KPWJ was first proposed by Katherine Pyeatt as a Class A facility, operating at 101.3 MHz, with an ERP of 3.1 kilowatts, and an elevation of 141 meters height above average terrain, from a transmission site northwest of Madisonville. The facility was sold and the construction permit transferred to Robert Clint Crawford on December 30, 2009, under the licensee name of Southwest Radio Broadcasting.

Crawford applied to change the facility's operating channel to the current 107.7, with a power increase to the full 6 kilowatts allowed for a Class A facility, from a tower site near Texas State Highway 90 in Madisonville. The modifications were granted by the FCC on February 19, 2010, and the facility received its first License to Cover at the new Madisonville site on April 6, 2010.

Bryan Broadcasting Corporation purchased KKLB on July 23, 2012. As a part of purchasing the facility, Bryan Broadcasting filed an application to move the facility from Madisonville to its current transmit site, requesting a change of COL to Kurten. A change of the callsign to its current KPWJ was granted on September 3, 2012, and the station was licensed to operate from the current site on January 15, 2013.

KKEE began broadcasting from its current site on January 11, 2017, simulcasting the "Peace" programming of sister station KPWJ, assuming the former frequency, and most of the coverage area of the original KKLB construction permit proposal.
