= WXBT =

- West Columbia, South Carolina; United States
- Broadcast area: Columbia metropolitan area
- Frequency: 100.1 MHz (HD Radio)
- Branding: 100.1 The Beat

Programming
- Format: Urban contemporary
- Subchannels: HD2: Black Information Network "Columbia's BIN 105.5"
- Affiliations: Premiere Networks

Ownership
- Owner: iHeartMedia, Inc.; (iHM Licenses, LLC)
- Sister stations: WCOS, WCOS-FM, WLTY, WNOK, WVOC

History
- First air date: August 5, 1975 (as WSCQ)
- Former call signs: WSCQ (1975–2003); WXBT (2003–2011); WVOC-FM (2011–2014)
- Call sign meaning: W X BeaT

Technical information
- Licensing authority: FCC
- Facility ID: 13589
- Class: A
- ERP: 5,900 watts
- HAAT: 100 meters (330 ft)
- Transmitter coordinates: 34°4′7″N 81°4′17″W
- Translator: HD2: 105.5 W288CX (Columbia)

Links
- Public license information: Public file; LMS
- Webcast: FM/HD1: Listen Live; HD2: Listen Live
- Website: FM/HD1: thebeatcolumbia.iheart.com HD2: columbia.binnews.com

WXBT (100.1 FM) is a commercial radio station licensed to West Columbia, South Carolina and serving the Columbia metropolitan area. It airs an urban contemporary radio format, branded as "100.1 The Beat", and is owned by iHeartMedia, Inc. WXBT carries the nationally syndicated morning show "Big Boy's Neighborhood." WXBT's radio studios are on Greystone Boulevard off Interstate 126, near Riverbanks Zoo.

WXBT's transmitter is off Frost Avenue in the Denny Terrace neighborhood, near Columbia International University. WXBT has an effective radiated power (ERP) of 5,900 watts. WXBT broadcasts using HD Radio technology. Its second digital subchannel carries the Black Information Network. The subchannel feeds FM translator W288CX at 105.5 MHz.

== History ==
=== All-news radio ===
On August 5, 1975, the station signed on as WSCQ, Columbia's first all-news station. It was an affiliate of NBC's News and Information Service (NIS). WSCQ was owned by Sanders Guignard and Barnett F. Goldberg with studios located at 1440 Knox Abbott Drive on the Cayce-West Columbia city limit boundary. Goldberg served as the station's original general manager, chief engineer, and led the design and construction of the studios and remote transmitter site. The WSCQ call sign stood for "We're South Carolina Quality".

Ratings for the new station struggled as the news and information format was unproven at the station's launch, measuring at a 0.1 in its first year on the air. In the early '70s, only some drivers had FM radios in their cars. That, combined with the lack of support from NBC for its new network, led to the failure of the original format.

=== Adult contemporary ===
With the station losing money, Guignard put a stake in the station's ownership for sale in late 1976, effectively forcing Mr. Goldberg out of the ownership group and management of the station. It was acquired by Congaree Broadcasters, a group consisting of former WIS veterans Gene McKay, Bill Benton, Dave Wright, and Dennis Waldrop. WSCQ retained its call letters, but changed the format to Adult Contemporary with Gene McKay hosting mornings (a position he had held previously at WIS and would hold at WSCQ over the next 22 years). Meantime, station partners Bill Benton and Dave Wright held down various on-air duties while Dennis Waldrop became the station's general manager. The station did very well throughout the rest of the 1970s and on throughout the 1980s as FM became the choice for radio listening.

The new owners retained a commitment to local news and information, with a full-time news and sports staff, hourly updates from the CBS Radio News Network, a local current-affairs talk show hosted by Benton, and a sports call-in show. Traffic reports in morning drive-time were delivered by the legendary "Voice of the Gamecocks" Bob Fulton. WSCQ was also the flagship station for South Carolina Gamecocks baseball live broadcasts. Special programming included a live remote broadcast on Friday nights with big band music from the ballroom of Columbia's Townhouse Hotel, hosted by Bill Walton. The live remote converted to a beach music format in 1981.

In the early 1980s, WSCQ adopted the "Q-100" handle with the slogan "Lite Rock, Less Talk." By 1991, the handle was changed to "Sunny 100", and a more upbeat AC approach was used.

=== Adult standards ===
By 1992, WSCQ had found itself in a 3-way battle with WTCB and WAAS (now WARQ) for the Adult Contemporary listening audience as well as declining ratings and revenues from commercial advertising. Management realized there was a hole in the market for older listeners and it was decided to change the format to Adult Standards, but retain the "Sunny 100" nickname.

Gene McKay was joined by station partners Bill Benton and Dave Wright as the morning show became "Good Morning Columbia", a mix of talk, news and music. Also, the station greatly expanded its news/talk programing in other parts of the day as the format became more full-service–oriented. Almost overnight, the station rebounded and enjoyed tremendous ratings.

In early 1997, WSCQ was sold to Benchmark Communications. While early rumors circulated that the station would change formats after the sale, it was not the immediate case and the station retained its Adult Standards format. However, by the end of 1997, Benchmark was sold to Capstar Broadcast Partners, which started to consolidate management and programming staff with sister stations WCOS, WHKZ (now WLTY), and WVOC. Longtime WSCQ General Manager Dennis Waldrop was dismissed in 1997, and "Good Morning Columbia" co-host Dave Wright decided to retire from radio in the fall of 1997. Wright was replaced by former afternoon host Doug Enlow, who also served as the station's program director at the time.

=== Jammin' Oldies ===
By late 1998, almost the entire air staff of WSCQ was dismissed, reduced to voicetracking all shifts outside of "Good Morning Columbia". Ratings declined dramatically over the next few months, leaving little choice but to abandon the Adult Standards format. In mid-June 1999, it was announced that WSCQ would change formats to Jammin' Oldies over the July 4 weekend. In a rare move, uncommon in radio, the station staff was allowed to say goodbye to its longtime listeners ahead of time. After the dismissal, "Good Morning Columbia" resurfaced within a month's time on Citadel Broadcasting's News/Talk outlet WISW.

On July 2, at 6 a.m., WSCQ began stunting by simulcasting sister stations WVOC and WLTY until 4 p.m., replaced by the sound of a ticking clock that lasted for an hour. At 5 p.m., the station launched its new format. Initially, the station was known as "100.1, Columbia's Jammin Oldies", but became known once again as "Q-100" one year later. WSCQ remained voice-tracked in its first year, but eventually added live disc jockeys in morning and afternoon drive times.

While most other Jammin' Oldies stations nationwide burned out within a period of 12 to 18 months, WSCQ was able to retain the format for a period of four years, becoming one of the few remaining such stations left in the country at the time.

=== Urban contemporary ===
However, on July 17, 2003, after a period where WSCQ's ratings had slowly eroded, the format was changed to Urban Contemporary as "100.1 The Beat", taking the new call letters of WXBT. Within a short amount of time, the station had beaten out Urban rival WHXT and Urban AC outlets WWDM and WLXC in the ratings.

WXBT was home to the nationally syndicated "Russ Parr In the Morning."

=== Talk radio ===
On October 26, 2011, at 1 p.m., WXBT ended its urban music programming and switched to a simulcast of co-owned talk radio station WVOC. On November 7, 2011, WXBT's call letters were officially changed to WVOC-FM. This was part of a transition to move WVOC to the FM band. On January 3, 2012, WVOC dropped its simulcast with WVOC-FM, as Sports radio programming on WCOS (1400 AM) was moved to WVOC's longtime AM 560 frequency.

In November 2012, Jonathon Rush and Kelly Nash of WCOS-FM replaced Keven Cohen, afternoon host since 1999.

=== Return to urban ===
On November 6, 2014, WVOC-FM once again began simulcasting on AM 560, in anticipation of returning the talk radio format to the AM dial. On December 10, 2014, WVOC-FM flipped back to urban as "100.1 The Beat", and changed its call letters back to WXBT on December 15. The talk format is now on WVOC, which has an FM translator at 103.5 MHz.
