= WISW =

Coordinates: 34°0′16.6″N 81°4′14.3″W

- Columbia, South Carolina; United States
- Broadcast area: Columbia, South Carolina
- Frequency: 1320 kHz
- Branding: ESPN Radio 1320

Programming
- Format: Sports
- Affiliations: ESPN Radio

Ownership
- Owner: Cumulus Media; (Radio License Holding CBC, LLC)
- Sister stations: WNKT; WLXC; WOMG; WTCB

History
- First air date: 1945 (as WKIX)
- Last air date: March 26, 2025
- Former call signs: WKIX (1945–1947); WMSC (1947–1962); WOIC (1962–1989); WOMG (1989–1995)
- Call sign meaning: "Wonderful Iodine State" (derived from former news partner WIS-TV)

Technical information
- Licensing authority: FCC
- Facility ID: 54793
- Class: B
- Power: 5,000 watts day; 2,500 watts night

Links
- Public license information: Public file; LMS

WISW (1320 AM) was a radio station licensed to Columbia, South Carolina. The Cumulus Media outlet was licensed by the Federal Communications Commission (FCC) to broadcast with 5,000 watts daytime and 2,500 watts nighttime, directional. Until going silent in March 2025, WISW was a sports radio station that went by the name ESPN Radio 1320.

WISW was formerly known as "News Talk 1320 WIS" or "WIS Radio", taking the base of its call sign from the former WIS. The latter station was the longtime sister station of WIS-TV, Columbia's long-dominant NBC affiliate. The WIS portion of the call letters stood for "Wonderful Iodine State". The former WIS is now WVOC 560 & 103.5.

Cumulus Media also owned WTCB 106.7, WOMG 98.5, WNKT 107.5, and WLXC 103.1 in the Columbia radio market. All 5 stations shared studios located at the Granby Building in Cayce; the WISW transmitter was in West Columbia. The station operated from 1945 to 2025.

== History ==
The station signed on as WKIX in 1945. The station featured local and national programing from the CBS Radio Network. In 1947, the station became WMSC, retaining the CBS Radio affiliation. The transmitter site was later used by WZLD and WXRY 99.3.

In 1962, WMSC was sold to new owners and the station became WOIC. WOIC had begun on 1470 and was the first station to target the African American community in Columbia. In 1976, WOIC applied for an FM on 103.1, which was dismissed and awarded to another group. WOIC appealed, which caused the application to be held up. The case was dismissed in October 1981 and 103.1 became WDPN (now WOMG) in 1982. WDPN was acquired by WOIC's parent company, Nuance Corporation, by 1985.

By the 1980s, WOIC's ratings started to decline due to the growth of new urban contemporary outlet WWDM. In the fall of 1989, it was announced by then-owners Price Broadcasting that the station would change over to a simulcast of WOMG-FM's oldies format. In order to prevent any community backlash, an arrangement was worked out with 1230 WODE to move the staff and programing over to their station. WODE became WOIC, while WOIC became WOMG, simulcasting the majority of WOMG-FM's programming, breaking off at times for broadcasting various Clemson University sporting events.

In 1995, WOMG became all-news WISW under a local marketing agreement with Cosmos Broadcasting, then-owners of NBC television affiliate WIS; the "WIS" call letters had previously resided on AM 560 (now WVOC) from 1930 to 1986. The station featured AP News as well as simulcasts of WIS's newscasts. In 1997, the syndicated Imus In The Morning show was added. Despite the changes as well as exposure from WIS-TV, ratings did not materialize as hoped.

In August 1999, Imus was dropped for "Good Morning Columbia", hosted by longtime former WSCQ air personalities Bill Benton, Doug Enlow, and Gene McKay (who died in 2007). Both McKay and Benton began in the Columbia market on the original WIS until leaving in the mid-1970s for WSCQ, which they were part-owners. Benton's son Charlie, a WISW sales manager, joined the show in 2007 after McKay's death.

With the addition of "Good Morning Columbia", WISW shifted the format to a mostly satellite-fed adult standards format, but kept the WIS newscasts in the process.

By 2002, the station adjusted its format again to a full-time news-talk format, competing head-on with rival WVOC. In addition to "Good Morning Columbia", the station featured a rotating "Local Angle" hour with nationally syndicated Neal Boortz, Bill O'Reilly, Sean Hannity, Laura Ingraham, Rollye James, and Jim Bohannon.

Until the format and transmitter move of WNKT from Charleston to Columbia, a weeknight "Prime Time Sports" program and a weekly "Sporting News Radio" program were featured.

Former WISW logo used until February 2014.

Also in 2002, WISW began airing South Carolina Gamecocks games after Host Communications decided to take the contract to Citadel Communications. WVOC had been the flagship of the Gamecocks for 48 years, but owner Clear Channel Communications was not willing to move any Gamecocks-related programming to the more powerful FM stations in its Columbia cluster. In contrast, Host's contract with Citadel guaranteed the Gamecocks airtime on Citadel's FM stations including WTCB. The station lost flagship status when WNKT moved in from Charleston in 2007. However, WISW remained the exclusive home of the women's basketball program (when there was a conflict between men's and women's games, WNKT aired the men's game while WISW aired the women's game).

"Good Morning Columbia" moved to WWNU and later WWNQ in 2012.

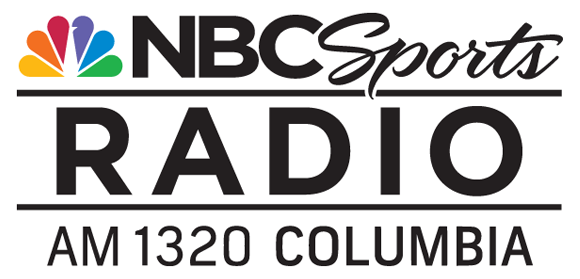
WISW's logo under previous NBC Sports radio affiliation

On February 3, 2014, WISW shifted to a sports talk format, utilizing the NBC Sports Radio network; it was the first Cumulus Media station to begin carrying a 24/7 Westwood One feed after the company's acquisition of the syndicator. After a brief period as "1320 The Fan", WISW switched its branding to "NBC Sports Radio AM 1320". When NBC Sports Radio ended operations as a full-time network, WISW switched to ESPN Radio, branded as "ESPN Radio 1320".

Cumulus Media took WISW off the air on March 26, 2025; the closure left the Atlanta Braves without a radio affiliate in Columbia. In its filing with the Federal Communications Commission (FCC), Cumulus stated it was "deciding whether to change the format or sell the station"; it had used the same rationale for other station closures earlier in the year. The license for WISW, along with three other defunct Cumulus stations, was surrendered that September; the FCC cancelled the station's license on September 29, 2025, at 12:01 AM EDT.

== See also ==
- List of radio stations in South Carolina
