= WLTY =

- Cayce, South Carolina; United States
- Broadcast area: Columbia metropolitan area
- Frequency: 96.7 MHz (HD Radio)
- Branding: 96.7 Steve FM

Programming
- Format: Adult hits
- Subchannels: HD3: Contemporary worship music "HIS Radio Praise"

Ownership
- Owner: iHeartMedia, Inc.; (iHM Licenses, LLC)
- Sister stations: WCOS, WCOS-FM, WNOK, WVOC, WXBT

History
- First air date: July 11, 1974 (as WZLD)
- Former call signs: WZLD (1974–1988); WYYS (1988–1991); WHKZ (1991–1998)
- Call sign meaning: From previous "Lite" format

Technical information
- Licensing authority: FCC
- Facility ID: 4667
- Class: C3
- ERP: 9,000 watts
- HAAT: 132 meters (433 ft)
- Translator: HD3: 106.3 W292EU (Columbia)

Links
- Public license information: Public file; LMS
- Webcast: Listen live (via iHeartRadio); HD3: Listen Live
- Website: 967stevefm.iheart.com HD3: hisradiopraise.com

WLTY (96.7 FM) is a commercial radio station licensed to Cayce, South Carolina, and serving the Columbia metropolitan area. It airs an adult hits radio format, known as Steve FM and is owned by iHeartMedia, Inc. The radio studios are on Greystone Boulevard in Columbia, near Interstate 126 and Riverbanks Zoo.

WLTY has an effective radiated power (ERP) of 9,000 watts. By contrast, several Columbia FM stations run 100,000 watts. The transmitter is on Short Street in Columbia, near Millwood Avenue (U.S. Route 76). WLTY broadcasts using HD Radio technology. Its HD-3 digital subchannel carries a contemporary worship music format.

== History ==
=== Top 40 and Rock ===
On July 11, 1974, the station signed on as WZLD. It featured a gold-based Adult Contemporary format and became the number one rated station in its first Arbitron ratings book. However, in late 1977, rival AM Top 40 WNOK countered the success of WZLD by flipping its sister FM station to Top 40 as "Stereo 105" WNOK-FM.

That move would stunt WZLD's growth in the marketplace and the format was changed to album-oriented rock (AOR) as "Z-96" by 1978. The format was run live-assisted using Drake-Chenault's AOR format. In 1980, the station changed back to Top 40 and both Z-96 and WNOK-FM went head to head for the next six years for the Columbia Top 40 radio audience.

=== Adult Contemporary ===
In February 1986, Z-96 made a dramatic format change from Top 40 back to its original format, adult contemporary, still using the Z96 moniker. The ratings were not good and by early 1987, the station changed back to Top 40. This time, however, the station found itself competing with not only WNOK, but with upstart WMMC (now WOMG) as well.

In February 1988, WZLD became WYYS with the "Yes 97" moniker. The format remained Top 40, this time with a lean toward dance music. The station makeover would eventually pay off as WMMC would become WPRH later in 1988 and would leave the Top 40 format altogether one year later. WNOK, however remained dominate in the Top 40 ratings and despite several attempts, could not be unseated.

=== Country music ===
In August 1991, after a brief stunt as "Elvis Radio", the format was changed to Country as "Kicks 96" with the new call sign of WHKZ. This time, the station targeted longtime country outlet 97.5 WCOS-FM. Although it had some modest success at first, Kicks 96 was never able to beat WCOS-FM in the ratings. WHKZ was sold in 1994 to the owners of WCOS-FM, Benchmark Communications. Benchmark kept the country format on 96.7 as a flanker to protect WCOS-FM, but over time, the station's ratings had started to erode.

By 1998, Benchmark was sold to Capstar Broadcasting. Since there was no need for two country stations under the same ownership as well as declining ratings, the decision was made to change WHKZ to a new format. Over Labor Day Weekend in 1998, WHKZ dropped the country format for brief simulcasts of Capstar sister stations WCOS-FM and WVOC. After the stunting, WHKZ flipped to soft adult contemporary music with the name "Lite 96.7" and the new call letters of WLTY.

=== Variety Hits ===
Previous logo

Despite the changes, Lite 96.7 never really took off in the Columbia market. After seven years of mediocre ratings against the dominant adult contemporary station, 106.7 WTCB, WLTY flipped on August 16, 2005 to variety hits as "Steve FM," rumored to be named for University of South Carolina college football coach Steve Spurrier. Spurrier was actually affiliated with WISW. After a year, Steve-FM was able to finish in the Top 5 in the Arbitron ratings, something that has not been achieved on the signal in over a decade.

On December 8, 2015, "Steve", as his namesake did weeks earlier, decided to resign from 96.7 after 11 years. Listeners were asked to choose a new name at Steve FM's website, with that name being revealed on December 14 at 8 AM. At that time, "Steve" came back out of retirement after just under a week, claiming he just needed some time off.

The station is owned by iHeartMedia, which also owns Sports talk WCOS-AM, country WCOS-FM, CHR WNOK, Urban contemporary WXBT and News/Talk WVOC in the Columbia radio market.

In November 2025 it transitioned all its broadcast time to Christmas-themed music. This programming change would be reverted in January 2026, before coming back again on November 5th 2026.
