= WCOS =

WCOS may refer to:

- WCOS (AM), a radio station (1400 AM) licensed to Columbia, South Carolina, United States
- WCOS-FM, a radio station (97.5 FM) licensed to Columbia, South Carolina
- WCOS-TV, a television station (channel 25) licensed to Columbia, South Carolina from 1953 to 1956
