= WNOK =

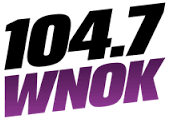
- Columbia, South Carolina; United States
- Broadcast area: Columbia metropolitan area; Midlands of South Carolina
- Frequency: 104.7 MHz (HD Radio)
- Branding: 104.7 WNOK

Programming
- Format: Top 40 (CHR)
- Affiliations: Compass Media Networks; Premiere Networks

Ownership
- Owner: iHeartMedia, Inc.; (iHM Licenses, LLC)
- Sister stations: WCOS; WCOS-FM; WLTY; WVOC; WXBT

History
- First air date: July 15, 1959

Technical information
- Licensing authority: FCC
- Facility ID: 19472
- Class: C1
- ERP: 90,000 watts
- HAAT: 315 meters (1,033 ft)
- Transmitter coordinates: 34.151°N 80.910°W

Links
- Public license information: Public file; LMS
- Webcast: Listen live (via iHeartRadio)
- Website: wnok.iheart.com

WNOK (104.7 FM) is a commercial radio station licensed to serve Columbia, South Carolina, owned by iHeartMedia, Inc. It airs an adult-leaning top 40 (CHR) radio format. The station's studios are on Greystone Boulevard in Columbia, off Interstate 126, near the Riverbanks Zoo.

WNOK has an effective radiated power (ERP) of 90,000 watts, its transmitter is in the northeast section of Columbia, off Hardscrabble Road at Lee Road.

== History ==
=== Beautiful music ===
WNOK-FM signed on the air on July 15, 1959. It was owned by the Palmetto Radio Corporation, along with WNOK (1230 AM, later WPCO) and WNOK-TV (channel 19 now WLTX). At that time, when few people owned FM radios, WNOK-FM mostly simulcast WNOK's middle of the road format of pop music, news and sports.

In the late 1960s, WNOK and WNOK-FM ended simulcasting. WNOK AM went with a Top 40 sound, while WNOK-FM flipped to a beautiful music format. It was mostly automated, playing quarter-hour sweeps of instrumental cover versions of popular songs, Broadway and Hollywood show tunes. In addition, WNOK-FM offered commercial-free instrumental background music on a subsidiary communications authority (SCA) subcarrier channel with a frequency of 23 kHz. This prevented the station from broadcasting in FM stereo because the SCA subchannel occupied part of the frequency band. In November 1963, WNOK-FM interrupted its background music service to announce that President John Kennedy had been shot in Dallas, Texas. The announcement was heard in department stores, restaurants and offices throughout the Columbia area.

=== Top 40 ===
Beginning in the mid-1970s, WNOK-FM gradually became more vocal with something of a soft adult contemporary format. The station switched to a mainstream top 40 sound in December 1976 as "Stereo 105" and was largely automated. As more people acquired FM radios, the ratings for WNOK-FM began climbing through the 1970s and into the 1980s.

By 1980, the automation was done away with, replaced with live disc jockeys, and the station's name was rounded up to "105 WNOK". By early 1984, as digital tuners became more common, the station became "104.7 WNOK". It was the first FM station in Columbia to use its actual frequency, down to the decimal place, as part of its name.

=== Ownership change ===
In 2000, Clear Channel Communications acquired WNOK.

=== IHeartMedia national syndication ===
In 2026, IHeartMedia began firing and removing certain radio hosts from radio stations, including Brodie & Thrills from WNOK. This movement was to begin broadcasting nationally syndicated shows on radio stations instead of having local hosts. Brodie & Thrills were replaced by Elizabethany in July 2026 due to this movement.
