= WLXC =

- Columbia, South Carolina; United States
- Broadcast area: Columbia, South Carolina
- Frequency: 103.1 MHz
- Branding: Kiss 103.1

Programming
- Format: Urban adult contemporary

Ownership
- Owner: Cumulus Media; (Radio License Holding CBC, LLC)
- Sister stations: WOMG; WNKT; WTCB

History
- First air date: 1982 (as WPDN)
- Former call signs: WPDN (1982–1986); WMMC (1986–1988); WPRH (1988–1989); WOMG (1989–2008)
- Call sign meaning: Lexington (98.5 FM's city of license)

Technical information
- Licensing authority: FCC
- Facility ID: 54794
- Class: A
- ERP: 6,000 watts
- HAAT: 94 meters (308 ft)
- Transmitter coordinates: 34°3′5.6″N 81°0′6.3″W

Links
- Public license information: Public file; LMS
- Webcast: Listen live
- Website: www.kiss-1031.com

WLXC (103.1 FM) is an urban adult contemporary radio station licensed to Columbia, South Carolina, that serves the Columbia, South Carolina, market. The Cumulus Media outlet is licensed by the Federal Communications Commission (FCC) to broadcast with an ERP of 6 kW. The station goes by the name "Kiss 103.1". Its studios are located at the Tower building in Downtown Columbia, South Carolina and the transmitter is in Columbia northeast of downtown.

== History ==
The Federal Communications Commission (FCC) allocated 103.1 MHz to Columbia beginning in 1976. The construction permit for the 3 kW. station was awarded in June of that year to MIDCOM Corporation, a group made up of Rev. I. DeQuincey Newman, J.E. Dickson, Bob Parnell, & Bob Cook. Construction for the station was held up for several years by appeals filed by Nuance Corp, the owners of crosstown AM urban contemporary outlet WOIC and one of the dismissed applicants for the proposed FM.

Eventually, the FCC sided with a lower court, approving the station to be licensed to MIDCOM in October 1981. Finally in 1982, the station hit the air as WDPN with an urban contemporary and jazz music format with its studios and tower located in the Columbia suburb of Dentsville.

Ratings for the new outlet were at a 4.2 in its first Arbitron ratings period. However, the station was overshadowed not only by the well-established WOIC, but competition from Sumter-based FM urban contemporary outlet WWDM, which became the dominant urban outlet in the market. By 1985, WDPN was acquired by WOIC's parent company, Nuance Corporation and WDPN's studios were moved into WOIC's facility at 910 Comanche Trail in West Columbia. Ratings for both stations began to decline.

In early 1986, both WPDN and WOIC were acquired by Alpha Communications. a group headed up by legendary air personality Chuck Dunaway (of WABC and KLIF fame). WOIC was left urban, while WDPM changed to Top 40/Crossover as "C-103" under the new call letters of WMMC. Almost overnight, the station's ratings increased. By early 1987, the station had evolved more toward a mainstream CHR format.

By early 1988, what gains that C-103 had made were slowly being eroded by rival CHRs WNOK and new upstart WYYS (now WLTY). The station was sold to Price Broadcasting, which changed the station's call letters to WPRH and the handle to "Power 103" on May 2, but kept the previous Top 40 format. This move did not work as the station's ratings spiraled downward within a year's time.

On April 15, 1989, after a week where the station experimented with a brief album rock format, Magic 103.1 was born, taking the new call letters of WOMG. This was the market's first FM oldies station since WWGO's (now WMFX) attempt 3 years prior (WODE, later known as WPCO), was doing oldies on AM during this time, but would change formats by the end of the year). At the start, Magic 103.1 was more focused on music from 1956 through 1968, but as time moved on, music from the 1970s were added into the format as well.

In February 1991, after the station had experienced a significant dip in the ratings, the station reimaged itself as Oldies 103, focusing on the music from 1964 to 1973. In later years, music from the late 1970s was re-added into the format.

In 1997, after years of planning and delays, the station was finally able to increase its power from 3 kW to 6 kW. This move solidified its signal coverage in the Columbia metro area. However, even with its new wattage, and Gamecock Basketball and Baseball rights, the station's power makes it inaccessible to western Lexington County, into Calhoun and Orangeburg; WQKI in Rowesville, South Carolina, blocks its signal. Those complaints led to Citadel Broadcasting moving the WNKT tower from St. George to Eastover, changing its market, and flipping that station to a sports station in order to carry Gamecock sports to a more accessible area.

On April 1, 2008, Citadel Broadcasting moved the urban contemporary format from 98.5 FM to 103.1 FM. The oldies format then heard on 103.1 FM moved to 98.5 FM, along with the WOMG calls. The WLXC calls were moved to 98.5 FM. Citadel merged with Cumulus Media on September 16, 2011.
