= White-barred =

White-barred can refer to:

- White-barred wrasse
- White-barred piculet
- Charaxes brutus, the white-barred emperor or white-barred charaxes
- Recurvaria leucatella, the lesser budmoth or white-barred groundling moth
- Acraea encedon, the common acraea, white-barred acraea or encedon acraea
- Synanthedon spheciformis, the white-barred clearwing
