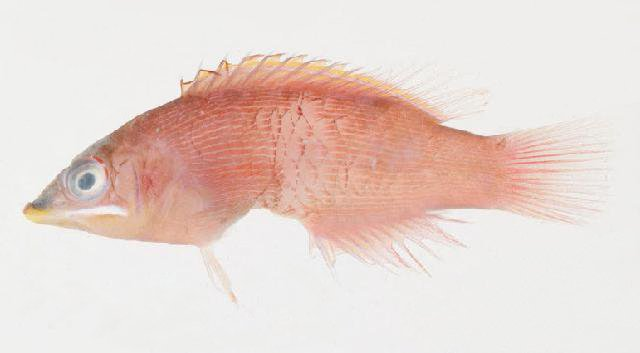

Conservation status
- Least Concern (IUCN 3.1)

Scientific classification
- Kingdom: Animalia
- Phylum: Chordata
- Class: Actinopterygii
- Order: Labriformes
- Family: Labridae
- Genus: Pseudocheilinus
- Species: P. evanidus

Binomial name
- Pseudocheilinus evanidus D. S. Jordan & Evermann, 1903

= Striated wrasse =

Species of fish

The striated wrasse (Pseudocheilinus evanidus), also known as the disappearing wrasse, pinstripe wrasse or scarlet wrasse, is a species of marine ray-finned fish from the family Labridae, the wrasses. It has a wide Indo-Pacific distribution. This species can also be found in the aquarium trade.

== Description ==
The striated wrasse is a small species of wrasse with an overall reddish colour with 24 fine longitudinal white lines on its body and sometimes showing 5-6 dark horizontal bars. There is a blue streak below the eye and the gill cover has dark margins. It can grow to 9 cm (3.5 in) in total length. The males and females show similar colourations and patterns but females tend to be less intensely coloured. The striated wrasse shows red fluorescence with the fluorescence being on the bony scales and fin rays.

== Distribution ==
The striated wrasse has a wide distribution in the Indian Ocean and in the Western Pacific Ocean from Africa to Hawaii. In the western Indian Ocean its range extends from the Red Sea off Jordan to South Africa, and it has been recorded from the Seychelles, Aldabra, Réunion, Mozambique and Pemba in Tanzania. In the Pacific Ocean it is found from the Izu Islands in Japan in the north and from Australia to Hawaii in the east and the Marquesas Islands in the south.

== Habitat and biology ==
The striated wrasse is a solitary and secretive benthopelagic wrasse which is found on the seaward slopes of reefs among patches of rubble or branching corals at depths of 6–40 metres (20–131 ft), or more, but it is infrequent at depths of less than 20 metres (66 ft). It is a carnivorous species which feeds on small benthic invertebrates. It is an oviparous species which shows pairing during spawning and in Japan breeding is thought to occur in the summer.

== Species description ==
Pseudocheilinus evanidus was first formally described in 1903 by David Starr Jordan and Barton Warren Evermann, the holotype was collected from Henshaw's pool near Hilo on Hawaii Island.

== Human usage ==
Straited wrasse are collected as food by Sea Gypsies in some parts of Thailand and it is also used in the aquarium trade.
