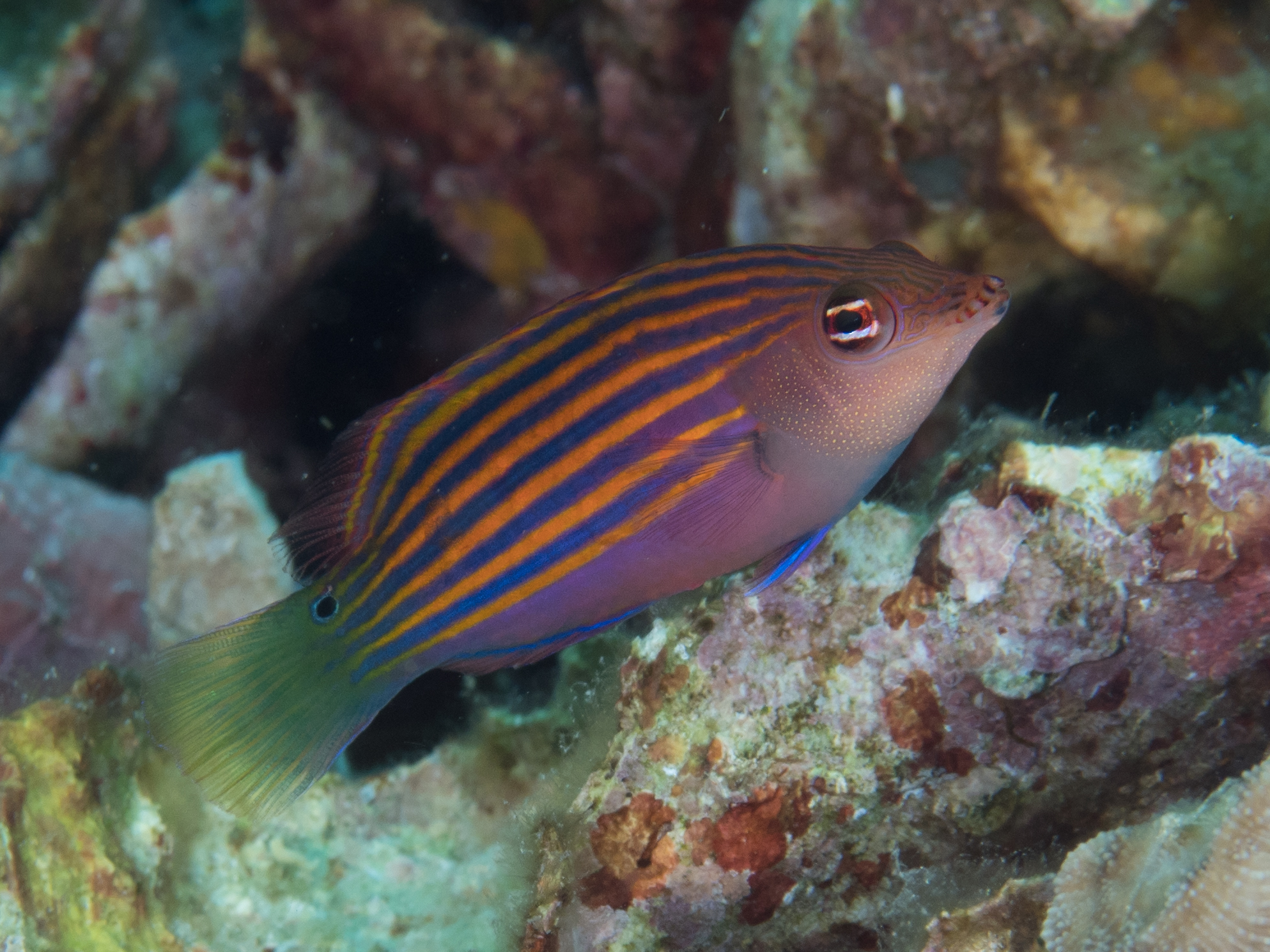
- Sixline wrasse (P. hexataenia)

Scientific classification
- Kingdom: Animalia
- Phylum: Chordata
- Class: Actinopterygii
- Order: Labriformes
- Family: Labridae
- Subfamily: Cirrhilabrinae
- Genus: Pseudocheilinus; Bleeker, 1862

Type species
- Cheilinus hexataenia Bleeker, 1857

= Pseudocheilinus =

Genus of fishes

Pseudocheilinus is a genus of wrasses native to the Indian and Pacific Oceans.

== Species ==
The currently recognized species in this genus are:

Image	Species	Common name
	Pseudocheilinus citrinus J. E. Randall, 1999	
	Pseudocheilinus dispilus J. E. Randall, 1999	
	Pseudocheilinus evanidus D. S. Jordan & Evermann, 1903	striated wrasse
	Pseudocheilinus hexataenia (Bleeker, 1857)	six-line wrasse
	Pseudocheilinus ocellatus J. E. Randall, 1999	white-barred wrasse
	Pseudocheilinus octotaenia O. P. Jenkins, 1901	eight-lined wrasse
	Pseudocheilinus tetrataenia L. P. Schultz, 1960	four-lined wrasse
