= WOMG =

- Lexington, South Carolina; United States
- Broadcast area: Columbia, South Carolina
- Frequency: 98.5 MHz
- Branding: 98.5 OMG

Programming
- Format: Classic hits
- Affiliations: Westwood One

Ownership
- Owner: Cumulus Media; (Radio License Holding CBC, LLC)
- Sister stations: WLXC; WNKT; WTCB

History
- First air date: August 31, 1994; 31 years ago
- Former call signs: WLXC (1993–2008)
- Call sign meaning: "Oldies Magic" ("Magic" is in reference to the previous moniker of the station; moniker was revived from April 2008 to February 2014)

Technical information
- Licensing authority: FCC
- Facility ID: 37200
- Class: A
- ERP: 6,000 watts
- HAAT: 99 meters (325 ft)
- Transmitter coordinates: 33°53′59″N 81°13′29″W

Links
- Public license information: Public file; LMS
- Webcast: Listen live
- Website: www.womg.com

WOMG (98.5 MHz) is a classic hits radio station licensed to Lexington, South Carolina, and serving the Columbia, South Carolina, market. The Cumulus Media outlet is licensed by the Federal Communications Commission (FCC) to broadcast with an ERP of 6 kW. WOMG's studios are located at the Granby Building in Cayce and its transmitter is in Columbia northeast of downtown.

== History ==
The Federal Communications Commission (FCC) allocated 98.5 MHz to Lexington, South Carolina, in the early 1990s as part of an FCC docket that would allow the Columbia metro area several new radio stations. The license was eventually awarded to Lexington Communications, which applied for the WLXC call letters. Before construction started, Lexington Communications agreed to sell the station to HFS Communications, another group, on the condition that WLXC was operated by the company for a period of one year before completing the transaction. Studios for the station were constructed in the town of Lexington while the transmitting facilities were built near the village of Red Bank.

WLXC was to be launched on August 26, 1994, but it was postponed due to area storm damage from the remnants of Tropical Storm Beryl (which produced several tornadoes in and near the town of Lexington) as well as problems with the station's phone lines. Finally on August 31, WLXC signed on with a sports radio format known as "98.5 The Ticket".

Local airstaff for WLXC in its first year included station general manager/part-owner Jim Forrest and Tom Hayes for mornings, Gary Pozik for mid-mornings (with a health and fitness show, which was dropped months later), Ken Wall for early afternoons, Matt Hogue's "Sports Mattinee" from 4-6 PM and Phil Kornblut and "South Carolina SportsTalk" for evenings (which was moved after several months of being pre-empted by games to all-news outlet WVOC II). National sports–talk programming, which included "The Fabulous Sports Babe", came from "American Radio Sports Network". Several months after WLXC signed on, "American Sports Radio" was sold to One on One Sports. The station also produced and aired significant high school sports content that featured live play-by-play of all area schools' football and basketball programs. WLXC programming even featured live play-by-play coverage of the 1995 Dixie Youth World Series held in Lexington, South Carolina.

While the station gained the rights for several national and regional sporting events, it had struggled in landing sporting events from the area's two most-popular teams: the University of South Carolina and Clemson University, primarily because both teams were already locked up in the Columbia market on other stations. At one point, WLXC came close to acquiring Clemson sporting rights when their radio network was sold to a different syndication group. Attempts by WLXC to acquire the rights were blocked when the area's then-Clemson affiliate, oldies outlet WOMG (103.1 FM), threatened the station with a lawsuit. Arbitron ratings for WLXC were almost non-existent throughout the entire year, scoring as low as 0.3 at one point.

In late 1995, after WLXC's transaction to HFS Communications was completed, the station was sold shortly afterwards for $1.4 million to Baker Broadcasting, headed up by Frank Baker, a former WOMG general manager and a partner in HFS Communications. Baker at the time was the owner of WWBZ in McClellanville and had also recently acquired WNCK in Port Royal. Both stations operated a Charleston-based syndicated beach music format known as "The Breeze", which Baker partially owned. In December, after weeks of rumors, WLXC announced that the format would be changed to "The Breeze" as well.

Airstaff on "The Breeze" network included veteran brother duo Leo and Woody Windham for mornings (both have been fixtures for many years in the Columbia radio market as well as part-owners of the network), Tanya Roberts (a former WOMG air talent) for middays, Bob Boswell for afternoons, and Eddie Zomerfield for nights. Iconic DJ Danger Dan (Elm) was an integral part of the network in the 1990s doing nights and weekends. He produced the Duke and Clemson Sports broadcasts and the Stingrays Hockey broadcasts. He also produced the Boat Show with L.J. Wallace, and took care of Fluffy the radio networks famous dog and her puppies as well* Also, in a strange twist of irony, WLXC was able to acquire Clemson football and baseball rights beginning in the fall of 1996 when an agreement was worked out with WOMG to divide the sports package between both stations.

Despite these changes, WLXC failed to gain traction in the Columbia ratings over the next couple of years, although it had a small but loyal following. In late February 1999, Baker Broadcasting announced that WLXC was sold for $3.2 million to Bloomington Broadcasting Corp. a company that owned local stations WTCB 106.7, WOMG 98.5, and now-defunct WISW 1320.

Immediately after the sale closed, WLXC ended "The Breeze" simulcast and took the station off the air following a Clemson men's basketball game on February 28. This move was in preparation for the studios to be relocated from Lexington to the Granby Building in Cayce, where Bloomington's other stations were located.

On March 4, at 3 pm, WLXC signed back on with an urban adult contemporary format under the "98.5 Kiss FM" handle. The station ran commercial-free in its first two weeks on the air using a mixture of local and Dallas-based ABC Radio Network "The Touch" urban AC format air talent, including morning man Carlton Booth. Several weeks later, Carlton Booth's morning show was dropped for the syndicated Tom Joyner Morning Show.

With the addition of Joyner and local afternoon host Kevin Holiday, WLXC's ratings jumped to fourth place in its first book (Summer, 1999), one of the strongest debuts in Columbia radio history for a new station.

In 2005, WLXC achieved success when it went to No. 1 12+ in the summer Arbitron ratings with a 7.5 share, its highest to date. However, ratings slipped to 11th place in the next book as WWDM reclaimed the top spot.

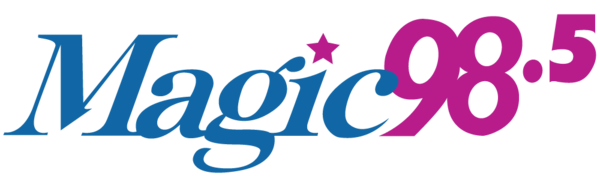
WOMG's former "Magic 98.5" logo used from 2008 to 2014

On April 1, 2008, the WOMG calls and the oldies format moved from 103.1 FM to 98.5 FM. The WLXC calls and the urban format moved to WOMG's old frequency of 103.1 MHz as "Magic 103.1". The switch happened at 10:00 am. The oldies format's positioner was changed from "Oldies 103" to "Magic 98.5". The oldies format aired on 103.1 for 18 years. It evolved to more of a classic hits format as of 2012, playing primarily 1970s and early 1980s music, with occasional 1960s music. Cumulus Media acquired WOMG as part of its merger with Citadel Broadcasting on September 16, 2011.

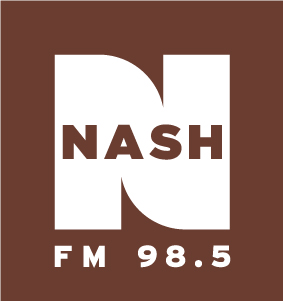
WOMG's former "Nash FM 98.5" logo used from 2014 to 2016.

On February 28, 2014, WOMG changed its format to country, branded as "Nash FM 98.5". In March 2015 WOMG rebranded as "98.5 Nash Icon", with a mix of classic and newer country.

WOMG's former "98.5 WOMG" logo used from 2016 to 2023.

On July 1, 2016, at 2 pm, WOMG returned to classic hits as "98.5 WOMG, Columbia's Greatest Hits". The format, primarily playing hits from the 1970s and 1980s, returned with 5,000 songs in a row.
