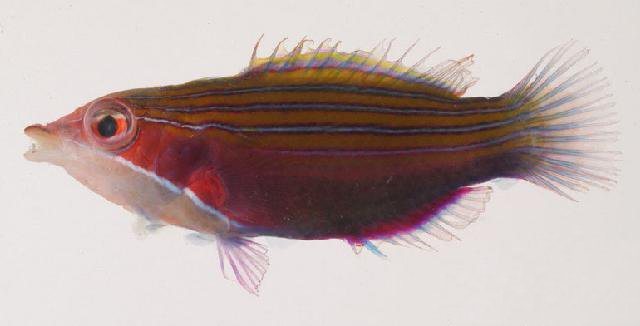

Conservation status
- Least Concern (IUCN 3.1)

Scientific classification
- Kingdom: Animalia
- Phylum: Chordata
- Class: Actinopterygii
- Order: Labriformes
- Family: Labridae
- Genus: Pseudocheilinus
- Species: P. tetrataenia

Binomial name
- Pseudocheilinus tetrataenia L. P. Schultz, 1960

= Four-lined wrasse =

Species of fish

The four-lined wrasse, Pseudocheilinus tetrataenia, is a species of wrasse native to the Pacific Ocean. It inhabits coral reefs at depths from 6 to 44 m (20 to 144 ft). This species can grow to 7.5 cm (3.0 in) in total length. It can be found in the aquarium trade.
