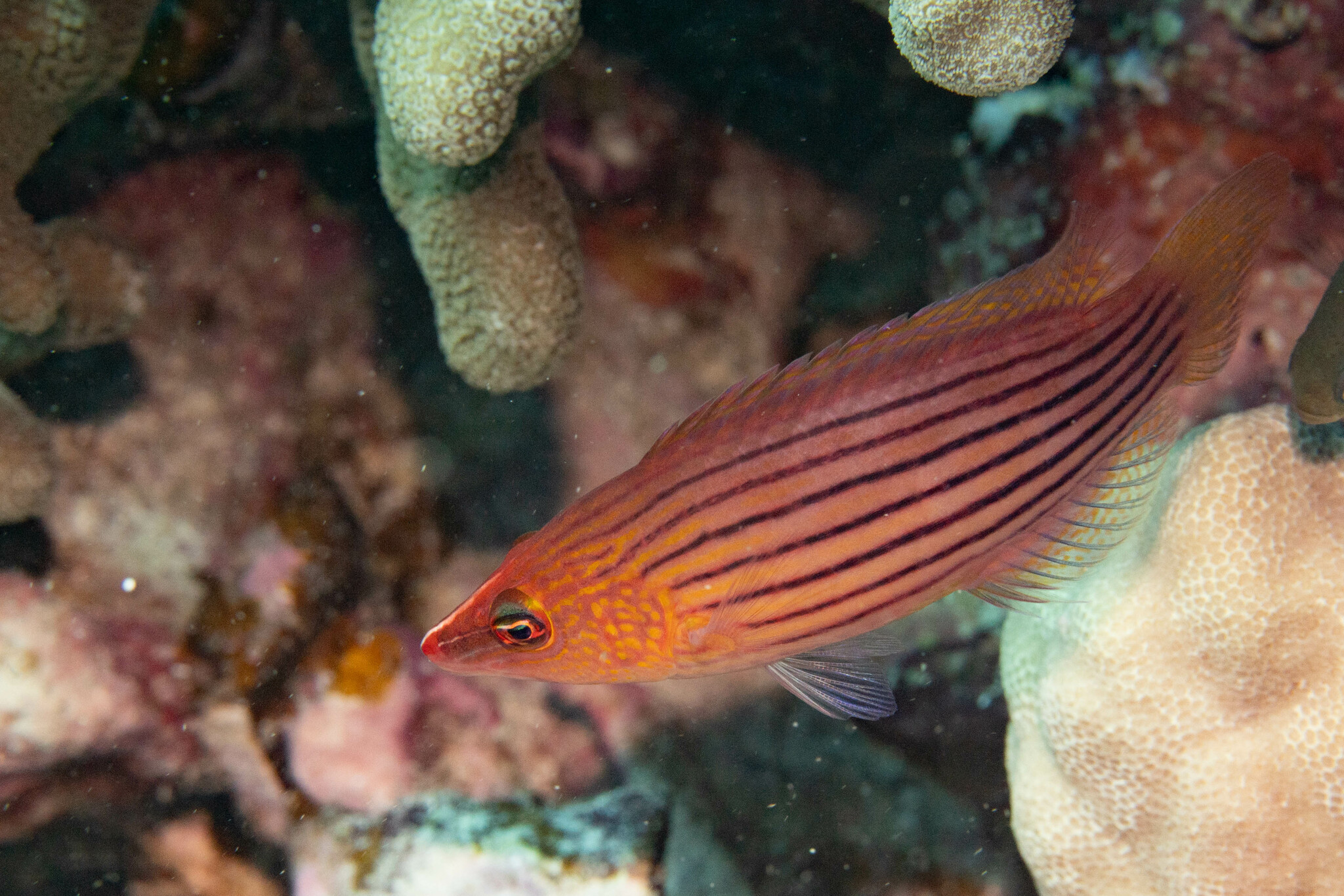
- In Hawaii

Conservation status
- Least Concern (IUCN 3.1)

Scientific classification
- Kingdom: Animalia
- Phylum: Chordata
- Class: Actinopterygii
- Order: Labriformes
- Family: Labridae
- Genus: Pseudocheilinus
- Species: P. octotaenia

Binomial name
- Pseudocheilinus octotaenia O. P. Jenkins, 1901

Synonyms
- Pseudocheilinus margaretae J. L. B. Smith, 1956

= Eight-lined wrasse =

Species of fish

The eight-lined wrasse (Pseudocheilinus octotaenia) is a species of marine ray-finned fish, a wrasse from the family Labridae, which is native to the Indian and Pacific Oceans. It occurs on coral reefs at depths from 2 to 50 m (6.6 to 164.0 ft), preferring to shelter in niches and caves. It can also be found in the aquarium trade.

== Description ==
The eight-lined wrasse is reddish to yellowish in colour with around eight thin purplish, horizontal stripes along its flanks, the three stripes top extend onto its head. There are small yellow spots on the cheek and gill cover, and some fish show large yellow markings which may be blotches or dashes on their bodies. This species can grow to a standard length of 14 cm (5.5 in).

== Distribution ==
The eight-lined wrasse has an Indo-West Pacific distribution and is found from the Comoros and the Seychelles in the western Indian Ocean to Hawaii and Ducie Island, extending north to Yaeyama Islands in Japan and south to New Caledonia, in the Pacific Ocean.

== Habitat and biology ==
The eight-lined wrasse is a benthopelagic species which is found among rubble or live corals of seaward reefs, where it prefers areas where there are caves and crevices containing abundant invertebrate growth, They are found down to depths of at least 40 metres (130 ft). It is a carnivorous fish which preys mostly on benthic crustaceans, as well as small molluscs, sea urchins, fish eggs, and crab larvae. This is a solitary, diurnal species which takes shelter in cavities where it creates a mucus cocoon in which to sleep during the night, it is thought that this cocoon helps protect it from nocturnal predators by masking the scent of the sleeping fish.

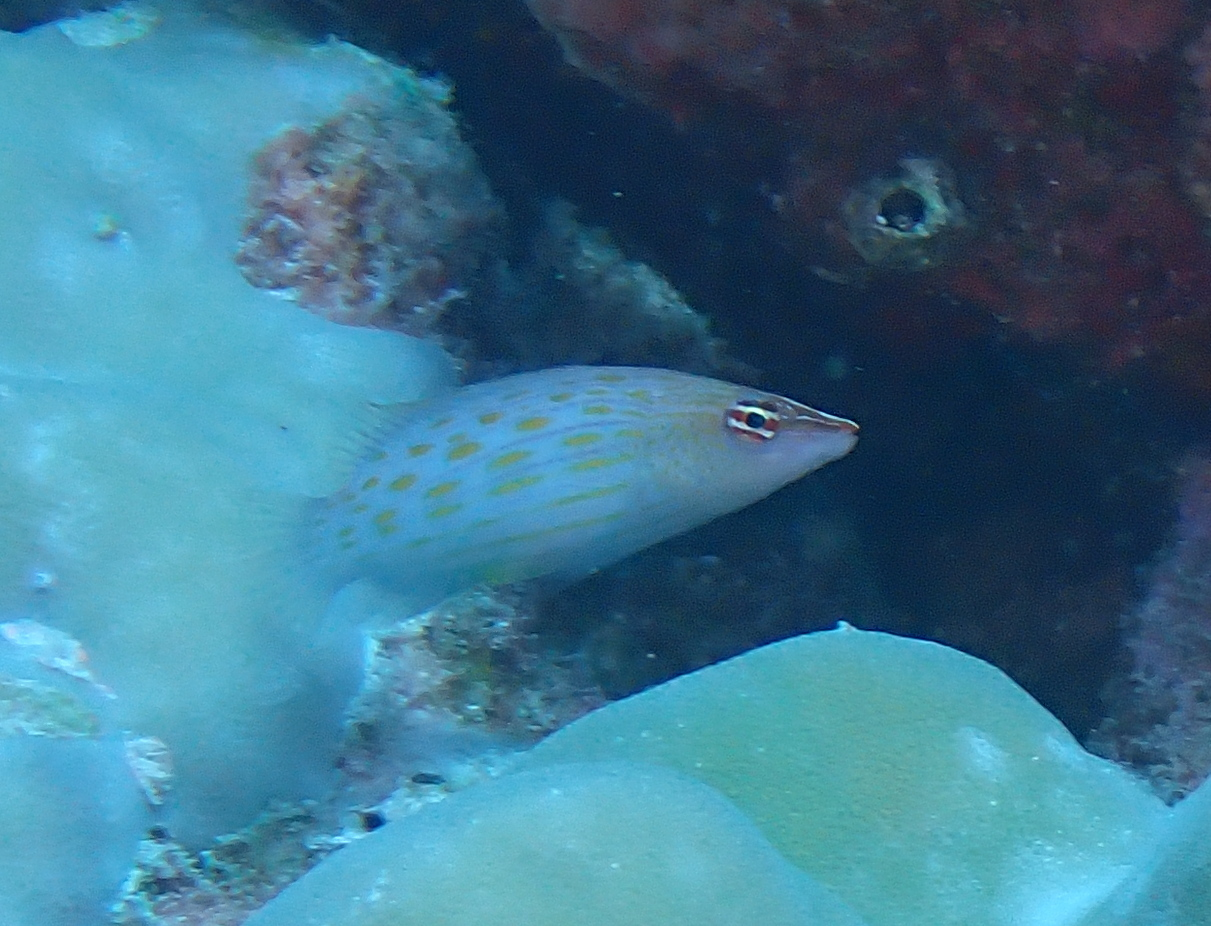
In Kiribati

== Human usage ==
The eight-lined wrasse is found in the aquarium trade, although they have not been bred in captivity, but is not commonly traded.

== Species description ==
It was first formally described by the American physiologist and histologist Oliver Peebles Jenkins (1850–1935) with the type locality being given as Honolulu, Oahu, Hawaii.
