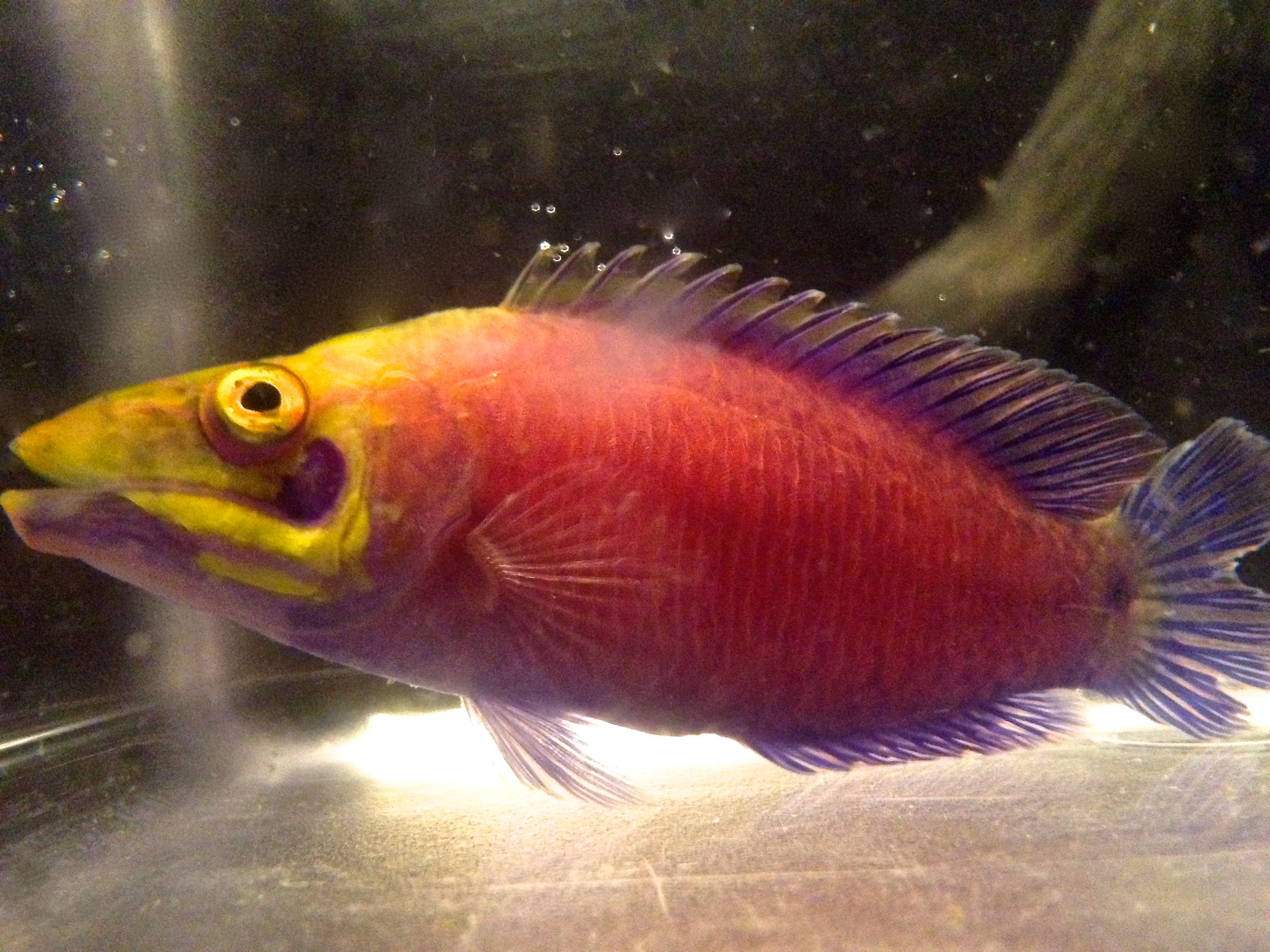

Conservation status
- Least Concern (IUCN 3.1)

Scientific classification
- Kingdom: Animalia
- Phylum: Chordata
- Class: Actinopterygii
- Order: Labriformes
- Family: Labridae
- Genus: Pseudocheilinus
- Species: P. ocellatus

Binomial name
- Pseudocheilinus ocellatus J. E. Randall, 1999

= White-barred wrasse =

Species of fish

The white-barred wrasse (Pseudocheilinus ocellatus), also known as the white-barred pink wrasse, is a species of marine ray-finned fish, a wrasse from the family Labridae This wrasse is native to the central western Pacific Ocean from Japan to the Coral Sea. It inhabits coral reefs at depths from 20 to 58 m (66 to 190 ft). This species can grow to 10.3 cm (4.1 in) in standard length. It can also be found, under the trade name "mystery wrasse", in the aquarium trade.

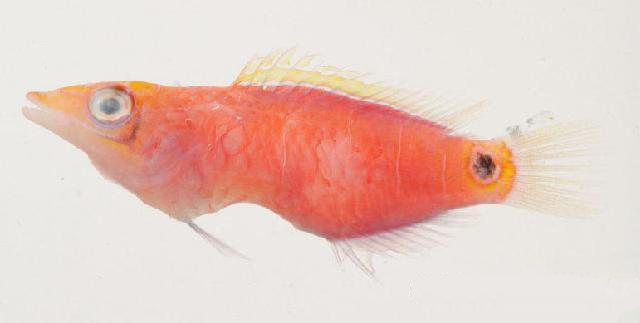
