= WCOS-FM =

Coordinates: 34.140°N 81.056°W

- Columbia, South Carolina; United States
- Broadcast area: Columbia metropolitan area
- Frequency: 97.5 MHz
- Branding: 97-5 WCOS

Programming
- Format: Country
- Affiliations: Premiere Networks

Ownership
- Owner: iHeartMedia, Inc.; (iHM Licenses, LLC)
- Sister stations: WCOS; WLTY; WNOK; WVOC; WXBT

History
- First air date: March 1951
- Former frequencies: 97.9 MHz (1951–1991)
- Call sign meaning: "Columbia's Own Station"

Technical information
- Licensing authority: FCC
- Facility ID: 71290
- Class: C1
- ERP: 100,000 watts
- HAAT: 299 meters (981 ft)

Links
- Public license information: Public file; LMS
- Webcast: Listen live (via iHeartRadio)
- Website: 975wcos.iheart.com

WCOS-FM (97.5 MHz) is a commercial radio station in Columbia, South Carolina. It airs a country music radio format and is owned by iHeartMedia, Inc. The station goes by the name 97-5 WCOS and its current slogan is "#1 For New Country". Its studios and offices are on Graystone Boulevard in Columbia near Interstate 126.

WCOS-FM has an effective radiated power (ERP) of 100,000 watts, the maximum for all non-grandfathered stations. The transmitter is north of the city, in the Arlington Heights neighborhood, off Heyward Brockingham Road. WCOS-FM broadcasts in the HD Radio hybrid format. It formerly carried a 1990s country hits format on its digital subchannel WCOS-FM-HD2. WCOS-FM is a primary entry point station for the Emergency Alert System.

== Programming ==
WCOS-FM plays a variety of country songs, mostly from the 2000s, but occasionally going back to the 1980s, with current and recent hits in heavy rotation. Weekdays begin with "The Morning Rush" featuring Jonathan Rush and Kelly Nash. Overnights, WCOS-FM carries the nationally syndicated "CMT After Midnite." WCOS-FM is South Carolina's primary entry point station for the Emergency Alert System.

== History ==
WCOS-FM signed on in March 1951 as the sister station of WCOS (1400 AM). It was Columbia's second FM station and originally broadcast on 97.9 MHz. Prior to 1963, it was on the air only during the evening hours. The separate programming featured Broadway showtunes, opera and classical music, along with news from the ABC Radio Network.

In the fall of 1963, the station began broadcasting in FM stereo and the hours were extended to the daytime. The morning show was a simulcast of 1400 WCOS, which was hosted by Bob Fulton, the long-time announcer for University of South Carolina Gamecocks football. After 9 am, the format was easy listening and beautiful music. The music was broadcast in mono until 6 pm, converting to stereo for the evening hours. In the late 1960s, WCOS-FM converted to a progressive rock format. Prior to the change, the station promoted the new format by announcing frequently that WCOS-FM was "going underground." By 1973, the station changed to country, adopting its longtime slogan "The Great 98." The country format has remained since.

In 1991, the station upgraded its signal by changing the frequency from 97.9 MHz to 97.5 MHz and increasing its power to 100,000 watts. That made it one of the strongest FM signals in the Columbia radio market.

In 1997, WCOS-AM-FM were acquired by Capstar, Inc. Then in 2000, Capstar, including WCOS-AM-FM, were acquired by San Antonio-based Clear Channel Communications. Clear Channel changed its name to iHeartMedia in 2014.

WCOS-FM is co-owned with sports radio station WCOS (AM), CHR/Top 40 station WNOK, variety hits station WLTY, urban contemporary station WXBT, Black Information Network station 105.5 W288CX, and talk radio station WVOC in the Columbia radio market.
