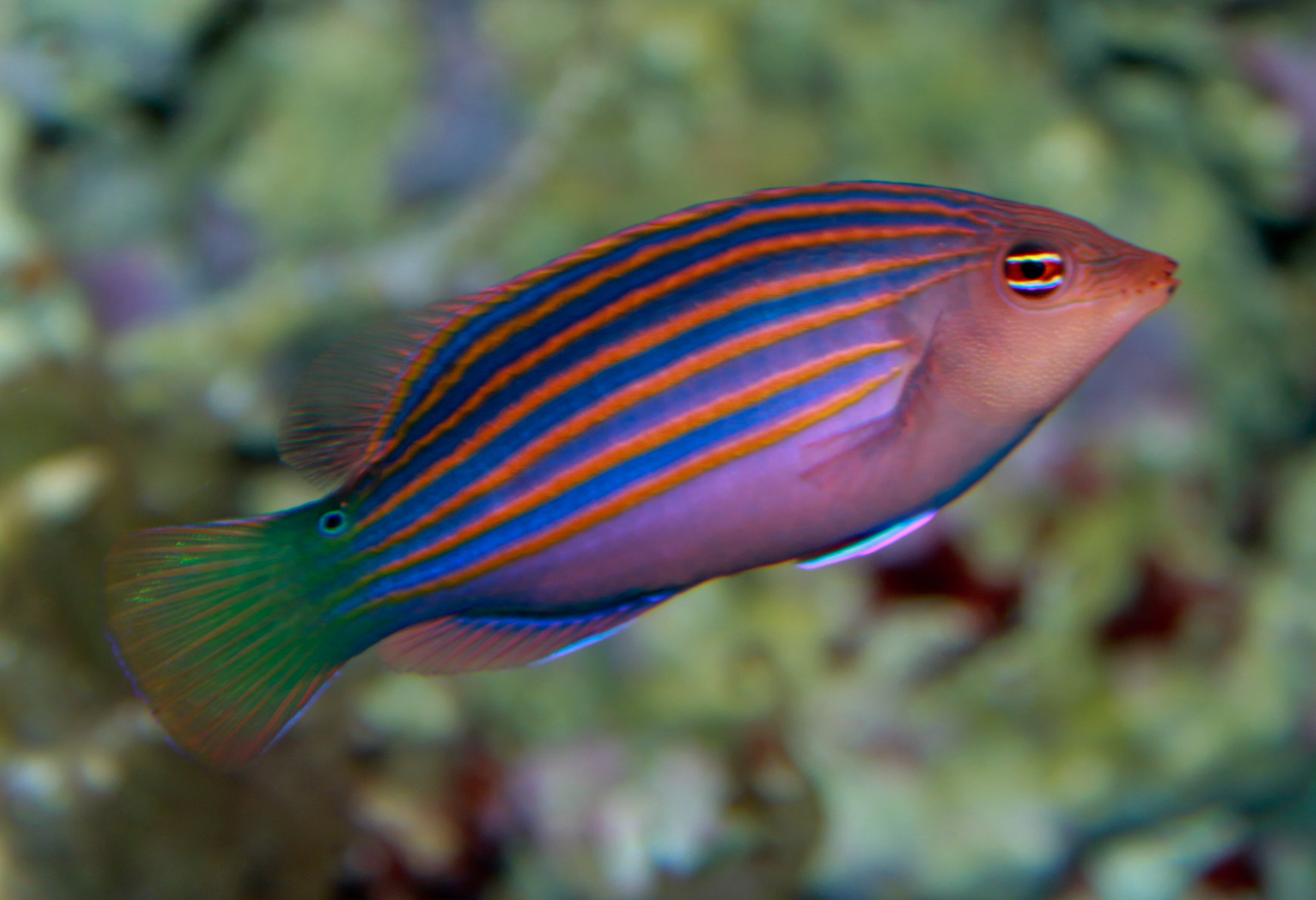

Conservation status
- Least Concern (IUCN 3.1)

Scientific classification
- Kingdom: Animalia
- Phylum: Chordata
- Class: Actinopterygii
- Order: Labriformes
- Family: Labridae
- Genus: Pseudocheilinus
- Species: P. hexataenia

Binomial name
- Pseudocheilinus hexataenia (Bleeker, 1857)

Synonyms
- Cheilinus hexataenia Bleeker, 1857; Pseudolabrus hexataenia (Bleeker, 1857); Pseudocheilinus psittaculus Kner & Steindachner, 1867; Cossyphus echis Guichenot, 1869

= Six-line wrasse =

Species of fish

The six-line wrasse (Pseudocheilinus hexataenia) is a species of marine ray-finned fish from the family Labridae which has a wide Indo-Pacific distribution. This species is associated with coral reefs and can be found in the aquarium trade.

== Taxonomy ==
This species was first formally described as Cheilinus hexataenia in 1857 by the Dutch ichthyologist Pieter Bleeker (1819-1878) with the type locality given as Ambon in the Moluccas. When Bleeker described the genus Pseudocheilinus in 1862 he designated Cheilinus hexataenia as its type species.

== Distribution ==
The six-line wrasse occurs from the eastern coast of Africa where it is found from the Red Sea to South Africa across the Indian Ocean and into the Western Pacific Ocean where its range extends north to Japan, south to northern Australia and east as far as Tuamotu.

== Description ==
The six-line wrasse is very small species of wrasse which attains a maximum total length of 10 centimetres (3.9 in). It is violet in colour and is marked with six orange stripes along the flanks. There is also a small eyespot on the dorsal part of the base of the caudal fin, a blue stripe along the base of the anal fin, and a blue streak on the pelvic fin. It has red eyes.

== Habitat and biology ==
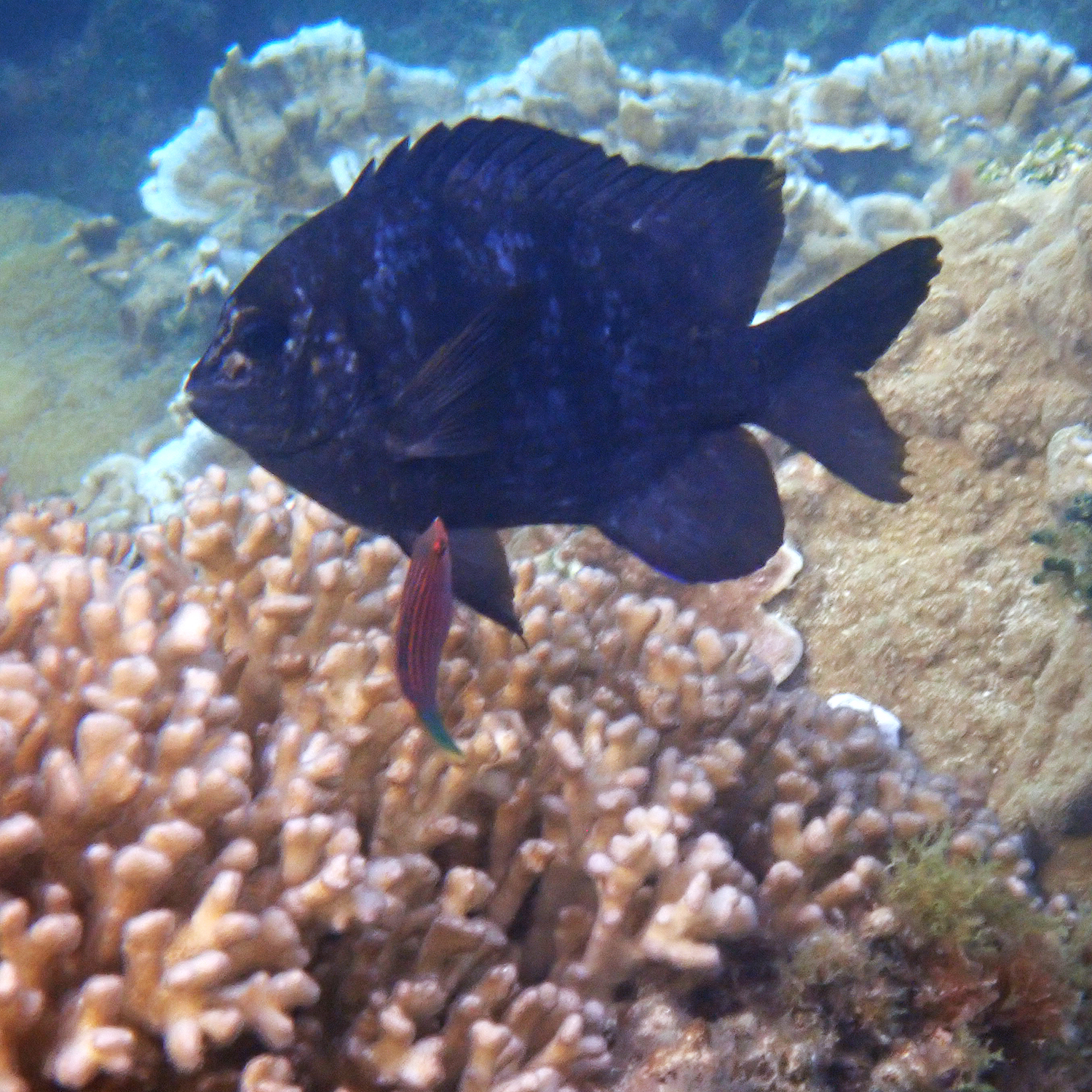
Cleaning a banded parma, at Norfolk Island

The six-line wrasse occurs among the branches of corals on seaward reef, it is also found in clear coastal waters and in areas of dense coral growth on the crests of reefs in shallow water or on the slopes. It has been recorded to depths of around 20 metres (66 ft). This is a secretive and shy species which is normally encountered in small, loose groups swimming among the branches of corals for protection. It feeds mainly on small crustaceans. They have also been recorded acting as cleaner fish removing ectoparasites such as copepods and isopods from other fishes. In the Izu Islands of Japan spawning takes place just before sunset and the paired adults undertake a very quick dash towards the surface to spawn, the speed of this dash reduces the risk of predation by other fish. This is a diurnal species which takes shelter in cavities where it creates a mucus cocoon in which to sleep during the night, it is thought that this cocoon helps protect it from nocturnal predators by masking the scent of the sleeping fish.

== Human usage ==
The six-line wrasse is a popular species in the aquarium trade, although they have not been bred in captivity. This species collected as food by Sea Gypsies in some parts of Thailand.
