= WCOS (AM) =

Coordinates: 34°0′18.6″N 81°00′42.3″W

- Columbia, South Carolina; United States
- Broadcast area: Columbia metropolitan area
- Frequency: 1400 kHz
- Branding: Fox Sports Radio 1400

Programming
- Format: Sports
- Affiliations: Fox Sports Radio; Atlanta Braves Radio Network

Ownership
- Owner: iHeartMedia, Inc.; (iHM Licenses, LLC)
- Sister stations: WCOS-FM; WLTY; WNOK; WVOC; WXBT

History
- First air date: 1939
- Call sign meaning: Columbia, South Carolina

Technical information
- Licensing authority: FCC
- Facility ID: 4673
- Class: C
- Power: 1,000 watts unlimited

Links
- Public license information: Public file; LMS
- Webcast: Listen live (via iHeartRadio)
- Website: foxsportsradio1400.iheart.com

WCOS (1400 AM) is a commercial radio station in Columbia, South Carolina. It carries a sports radio format and is owned by iHeartMedia, Inc. The station goes by the name Fox Sports Radio 1400. Its studios and offices are on Graystone Boulevard in Columbia near Interstate 126. The transmitter is on Short Street in Columbia, near Millwood Avenue (U.S. Route 76).

WCOS is an affiliate of the Atlanta Braves radio network, with the largest number of stations in Major League Baseball.

== History ==
WCOS signed on in 1939, making it Columbia's second radio station. The station featured programming from NBC's Blue Network (which later became the ABC Radio Network) as well as local programming.

In 1958, the station stunted by playing Sammy Kaye's "I Wish I Was In Dixie" over a period of 24 hours before switching over to the "Top 60 in Dixie" playlist, a format that it kept for the next 20 years under various monikers like "Super COS", and "Position 14".

In 1980, after being beaten in the ratings by rival FM Top 40 WNOK, WCOS changed over to country, simulcasting parts of the broadcasting day of their sister FM, WCOS-FM. In the early 1990s, the station adjusted its format to satellite-fed classic country, but went back to simulcasting WCOS-FM within a year's time. In 1995, WCOS switched to CNN Headline News.

In 1996, WCOS adopted its present sports talk format.

In 2007, WCOS re-branded itself as "The Team". On January 3, 2012, as part of a three-way swap, WVOC's news/talk format moved to WXBT-FM, which changed its calls to WVOC-FM. WVOC then changed its calls to WXBT (AM), which took WCOS' sports talk programming. WCOS became "Hallelujah 1400", an urban gospel station.

On November 6, 2014, WCOS switched back to sports while WXBT returned to news/talk as WVOC, and WVOC-FM returned to urban contemporary as WXBT.

The station is owned by iHeartMedia, which also owns WCOS-FM, CHR station WNOK, variety hits station WLTY, urban contemporary station WXBT and news/talk station WVOC in the Columbia radio market.
