= WTCB =

- Orangeburg, South Carolina; United States
- Broadcast area: Columbia metropolitan area
- Frequency: 106.7 MHz
- Branding: B106.7

Programming
- Format: Adult contemporary
- Affiliations: Compass Media Networks

Ownership
- Owner: Cumulus Media; (Radio License Holding CBC, LLC)
- Sister stations: WLXC, WNKT, WOMG

History
- First air date: July 6, 1967
- Former call signs: WDIX-FM (1967–1976); WPJS (1976–1982); WIGL (1982–1985)
- Call sign meaning: "The Carolinas' Best"

Technical information
- Licensing authority: FCC
- Facility ID: 54791
- Class: C1
- ERP: 100,000 watts
- HAAT: 240 meters (790 ft)
- Transmitter coordinates: 33°46′52.6″N 80°55′13.3″W

Links
- Public license information: Public file; LMS
- Webcast: Listen live
- Website: www.b106fm.com

WTCB (106.7 FM) is a commercial radio station licensed to Orangeburg, South Carolina, United States, and serving the Columbia metropolitan area. The station, known as "B106.7", is owned by Cumulus Media and airs an adult contemporary radio format. The station's studios and offices are located on Gervais Street in Downtown Columbia.

WTCB's transmitter is sited off Indian Trail in Swansea, near the Congaree National Park.

== History ==
=== WDIX-FM and WPJS ===
On July 6, 1967, the station signed on as WDIX-FM, the sister station to WDIX (AM 1150) in Orangeburg (formerly WRNO, now off the air). The station was known as "W-107" and was owned by Frank Best. At the time, the station featured an automated format with music that would be considered today as Hot Adult Contemporary.

In late 1976, both stations were sold to Radio Smiles, a group owned by Norman Suttles. WDIX changed to Top 40, while WDIX-FM became religious WPJS. The call sign stood for "We Proclaim Jesus Saves". In 1978, the transmitting power was increased from 37,000 to 100,000 watts, using a new CCA transmitter and 10-bay Shively antenna tower.

=== Country WIGL ===
In 1982, WDIX and WPJS were sold to the Keymarket Group. WPJS became country music WIGL, calling itself "Wiggle 106". It used a format from TM's (now Jones TM) "3-In-A-Row" Modern Country music service, operating it live-assisted. WIGL made an effort to serve the larger, more lucrative Columbia radio market, but was plagued with periodical audio problems as well as fierce competition from established country station WCOS-FM. In 1984, Suburban Radio Group of Concord, North Carolina, bought WDIX, and in 1985, the company bought WORG.

In early 1985, WIGL took the first steps toward improving its coverage of Columbia by building a new 714-foot (218 m) tower in Sandy Run and moving the studios to the Granby Building in Cayce. It was rumored that WIGL would remain country and challenge Columbia's longtime country powerhouse, WCOS-FM. That rumor proved false.

=== Switch to AC ===
On April 15, 1985, the station signed on from its new tower as an adult contemporary/CHR/oldies hybrid with the new call letters WTCB and a new moniker, "B106". WTCB quickly improved its ratings, with a more contemporary format and a signal that covered two-thirds of South Carolina. WTCB provides at least secondary coverage from the southern suburbs of Charlotte to the northern suburbs of Charleston.

By the late 1980s, due to changing market conditions, "B106" softened its music by dropping the more upbeat titles and focused on being a soft adult contemporary outlet. At that time, the market had two other AC outlets, WSCQ and new upstart WAAS (now WARQ), fighting for Columbia's AC audience. By the end of 1992, both stations flipped to different formats, leaving WTCB as the only AC remaining in the market. Bloomington Broadcasting purchased the station in 1989 from Keymarket Communications for $4.34 million. Bill McElveen was the general manager until Cumulus Media purchased the station in late 2011.

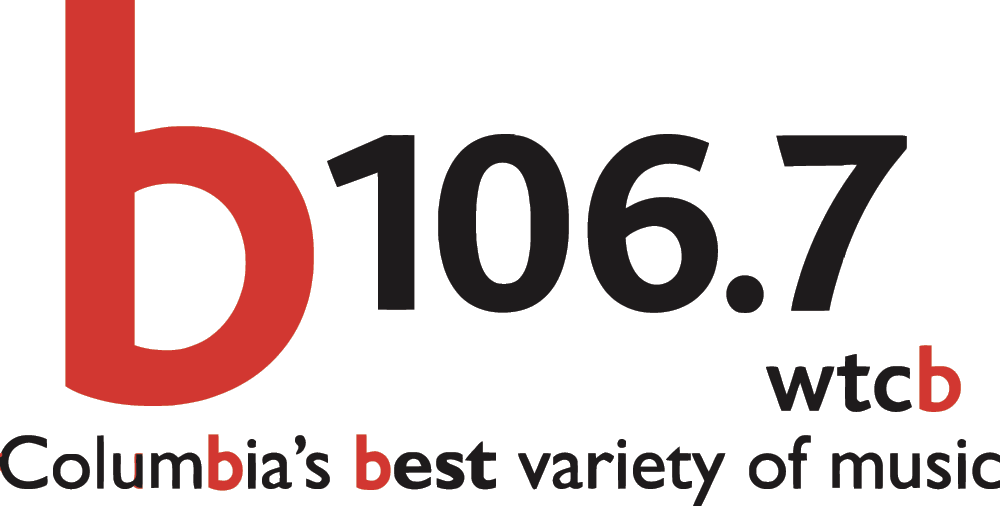
Former logo used between 1993 and May 2013

Beginning in 1993, "B106" gradually reverted toward a more upbeat gold-based AC format. With the increasing use of digital tuners on radios, the station updated its on-air moniker as "B106.7".

=== Gamecocks football ===
From September 2002 until November 2007, WTCB was the flagship radio station for University of South Carolina Gamecocks football, taking over from longtime outlet WVOC. WTCB devoted a significant number of hours to pre-game and post-game coverage on Saturdays when the team played its games. When Citadel Broadcasting moved co-owned WNKT FM 107.5 from the Charleston radio market to Columbia, it switched that station to an all sports format. Citadel merged with Cumulus Media on September 16, 2011.

=== Format adjustments ===
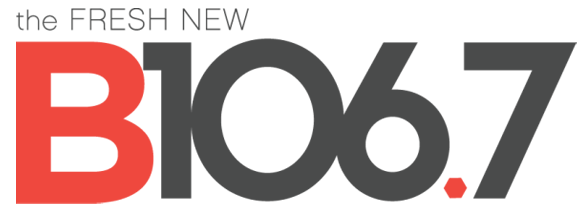
Former logo

On July 15, 2013, WTCB shifted its format to hot adult contemporary. With the change by sister station WOMG 98.5 from classic hits to country music in 2014, WTCB added some 1980s music to its playlist. In 2015, WTCB moved to new studio in downtown Columbia, across from the State Capital in The Tower building currently anchored by the Bank of America.

WTCB shifted to a mainstream adult contemporary format playing current and past AC artists being inclusive of a younger demo. WTCB began the practice of playing all Christmas music from Thanksgiving week until Christmas Day during that time.
