= WNKT =

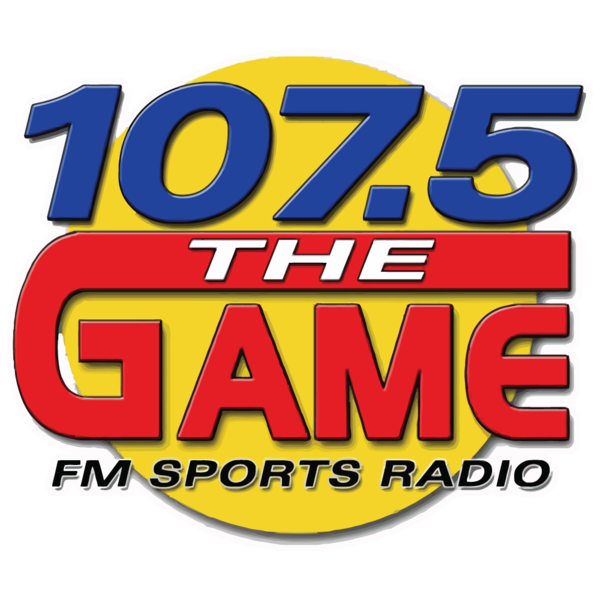
- Eastover, South Carolina; United States
- Broadcast area: Columbia, South Carolina
- Frequency: 107.5 MHz
- Branding: 107.5 The Game

Programming
- Format: Sports
- Affiliations: Infinity Sports Network; Fox Sports Radio; Professional Golfers Association

Ownership
- Owner: Cumulus Media; (Radio License Holding CBC, LLC)
- Sister stations: WTCB; WOMG; WLXC

History
- First air date: January 5, 1971 (as WDWQ in St. George; moved to Eastover in 2007)
- Former call signs: WDWQ (1971–1977); WKQB (1977–1991); WBUB (1991–1997)
- Call sign meaning: reference to previous branding as Cat Country 107.5

Technical information
- Licensing authority: FCC
- Facility ID: 38900
- Class: C2
- ERP: 40,000 watts
- HAAT: 167 meters (548 ft)
- Transmitter coordinates: 33°45′46.6″N 80°49′22.3″W

Links
- Public license information: Public file; LMS
- Webcast: Listen live
- Website: 1075thegame.com

WNKT (107.5 FM) is a sports radio station licensed to Eastover, South Carolina, and serves the Columbia, South Carolina, market. The Cumulus Media outlet is licensed by the Federal Communications Commission (FCC) to broadcast with an effective radiated power (ERP) of 40 kW. The station goes by the name “107.5 The Game”. Its studios are located in downtown Columbia, South Carolina and the transmitter is west of St. Matthews, South Carolina.

== History ==
The station signed on January 5, 1971, as WDWQ in St. George, a Charleston suburb. It was the FM sister to WQIZ. The FM station was sold in 1977 to a Washington, DC–based group that moved the studios to North Charleston and flipped the station to top 40 as "Q107" WKQB. The "Q107" moniker was briefly dropped in 1984 for "Power 107" but Q107 was reclaimed one year later. Q107 eventually topped rival CHR WSSX as the number one CHR in the market on several occasions in the later half in the 1980s under a Dance-leaning CHR format.

Q107 gained fame in September 1989 as it broadcast continuously during Hurricane Hugo's landfall in the Charleston area. The transmitter was located further inland than most Charleston stations, allowing Q107 to stay on the air long after the other stations lost power. The broadcast ended when the station lost power at the transmitter site. Although there was a generator at the studios, there was no generator at the St. George tower site. The staff never left the studios; in fact the station personnel, their families and pets camped out in the radio station awaiting the return of power. The station returned to the air after the storm passed and broadcast vital information to area residents for weeks afterward.

Q107 entered the 1990s under serious hardship. The station shut down in early 1991 and simulcast for a brief time with WSUY in order to stay on the air. WKQB was eventually sold in 1991 to a new owner, which took the station to classic-leaning country music as WBUB, "Bubba 107.5", in the Spring of 1991.

In 1997, the station was sold to Citadel Broadcasting as the station dropped the "Bubba 107.5" handle for "Cat Country 107.5" as WNKT.

On July 5, 2007, WNKT was issued a construction permit to move the station to Eastover, a Columbia suburb. On November 10, 2007, WNKT dropped its country format for a continuous loop of the song "The Dance" by Garth Brooks, interspaced with liners redirecting listeners to sister country station WIWF. After two days, the station's over the air signal in Charleston was turned off in preparation for the move to Columbia. WNKT's online stream, however, remained intact, and continued to play "The Dance".

On November 12, 2007, at 1:07 p.m., WNKT signed back on from Columbia as "107-5 The Game" adopting a sports talk format. The move included a power reduction from 100,000 watts to 40,000. Citadel merged with Cumulus Media on September 16, 2011. As part of the deal, WNKT became the flagship station of the South Carolina Gamecocks.

In 2013, WNKT switched from Fox Sports Radio to CBS Sports Radio.

Effective August 28, 2023, WNKT began a half-day (6 a.m. to 6 p.m.) simulcast on sister stations WWFN-FM in Marion and WSEA in Atlantic Beach.
