= WVOC =

Radio station in Columbia, South Carolina

- Columbia, South Carolina; United States
- Broadcast area: Columbia metropolitan area
- Frequency: 560 kHz
- Branding: News Radio 103.5 & 560 WVOC

Programming
- Format: News/talk
- Affiliations: Premiere Networks; Westwood One; Compass Media Networks; Fox News Radio

Ownership
- Owner: iHeartMedia, Inc.; (iHM Licenses, LLC)
- Sister stations: WCOS, WCOS-FM, WLTY, WNOK, WXBT

History
- First air date: July 10, 1930; 96 years ago (as WIS)
- Former call signs: WIS (1930–1986); WVOC (1986–2011); WXBT (2011–2014)
- Call sign meaning: "Voice Of Columbia"

Technical information
- Licensing authority: FCC
- Facility ID: 11902
- Class: B
- Power: 5,000 watts
- Transmitter coordinates: 34°2′0″N 81°8′32″W
- Translator: 103.5 W278CY (Columbia)

Links
- Public license information: Public file; LMS
- Webcast: Listen Live
- Website: wvoc.iheart.com

WVOC (560 AM) – branded News Radio 103.5 & 560 WVOC – is a commercial news/talk radio station licensed to serve Columbia, South Carolina. Owned by iHeartMedia, Inc., the station covers the Columbia metropolitan area. The WVOC studios and transmitter are located in Columbia. In addition to a standard analog transmission, WVOC is simulcast over FM translator W278CY (103.5 FM), and is available online via iHeartRadio.

WVOC's power is 5,000 watts around the clock from a three-tower facility west of Columbia. By day it uses a non-directional signal from a single tower. Its daytime signal provides at least secondary coverage as far north as the Charlotte suburbs, as far west as Spartanburg and Greenwood, and as far south as the Augusta and Charleston suburbs. At night, power is fed to all three towers in a directional pattern to protect other stations on 560 AM. This concentrates WVOC's signal in the central part of the state.

== History ==
The station signed on as WIS on July 10, 1930. The call letters were derived from South Carolina's nickname "Wonderful Iodine State"; before the modern-day manufacturing of iodized salt, a high level of iodine in the state's soil gave the state's residents "a low incidence of goiters." WIS was the last broadcast station in the United States to have been issued a previously unused call sign with three letters; this assignment took place on January 23, 1930. Soon after signing on, WIS was bought by Liberty Life Insurance Company of Columbia, becoming one of many early radio stations owned by insurance companies in the South.

On October 10, 1931, WIS changed its network affiliation from CBS to the NBC Blue Network. In December 1940, the affiliation was switched to the NBC Red Network.

On November 14, 1949, a two-story studio on Bull Street was completed to house both the radio station and a planned television station. Construction of WIS-TV was authorized January 29, 1953, and the station signed on the air on November 7, 1953. The two stations operated under a newly formed Liberty Insurance subsidiary, the Broadcasting Company of the South. After acquiring several other stations across the country, it changed its name to Cosmos Broadcasting Corporation, with WIS-AM-TV as the flagship stations.

Cosmos pulled out of radio in 1986, and the new owners adopted the call sign WVOC on December 31. The TV station kept the WIS-TV call letters. The radio station had to change its call sign due to a since-repealed FCC rule that barred stations with different ownership from sharing the same call sign. (WVOC had been the call letters of the student radio station at Canisius College in Buffalo, New York, from 1964 to 1976.) The new owners dropped the 56-year affiliation with NBC in favor of CBS Radio News.

WVOC began a talk radio format with mostly syndicated shows, including Rush Limbaugh, Michael Savage, Glenn Beck, Matt Drudge, Kim Komando and Coast to Coast AM. The station also featured a statewide-syndicated sports talk show in evenings.

In 2001, Clear Channel Communications bought the station. WVOC switched its network affiliation to ABC Radio News after signing a deal to run ABC Radio commentator Paul Harvey. In 2005, as part of a corporate-wide change, the station changed to Fox News Radio.

From 1954 until 2002, WIS/WVOC was the flagship for the University of South Carolina college football and basketball, and touted itself as the "Home of the Gamecocks." However, on June 27, 2002, Host Communications, which handled game broadcasts for the university, decided to leave WVOC in favor of rival Citadel Broadcasting stations. The decision put Gamecock athletics on Citadel's FM signals, which had wider coverage than WVOC.

WVOC was the flagship radio station of the May 15, 2007, broadcast of the Fox News Republican Presidential Debate which took place in Columbia.

On October 26, 2011, WVOC began simulcasting on its sister station WXBT, which had previously broadcast an urban contemporary format. That November, WXBT changed its call sign to WVOC-FM. On January 3, 2012, as part of a three-way format swap, the sports radio programming that was on WCOS (1400 AM) was moved to WVOC, and the call sign was changed to WXBT. As part of the swap, WXBT adopted the moniker "SportsRadio 560 The Team."

In 2013, WXBT became an affiliate of Fox Sports Radio after it originally carried ESPN Radio programming.

WXBT fired most of its local hosts in October 2014 owing to poor ratings. That November 6, WXBT switched to a simulcast of WVOC-FM, while its former sports programming moved back to WCOS.

Logo before translator sign on

The simulcast ended on December 10, when the talk programming moved exclusively to AM 560, which changed its call letters back to WVOC on December 15. WXBT also returned to its previous urban contemporary format; in effect, this move reversed the 2011 format swap. In November 2019, WVOC added an FM translator, W278CY at 103.5 MHz.

== Programming ==
WVOC personalities Gary David and Christopher Thompson host the morning drive program. The rest of the schedule is taken up by syndicated talk programming. The Glenn Beck Program, The Clay Travis and Buck Sexton Show, The Sean Hannity Show, air in late mornings, middays, and afternoons, all of which are from Premiere Networks. The Mark Levin Show (via Westwood One), and Clyde Lewis (via Premiere) air in the evening hours, while Coast to Coast AM (via Premiere) and This Morning, America's First News with Gordon Deal (via Compass Media Networks) air in the overnight hours.

Weekends hosts include Kim Komando, Rudy Maxa, Ron Wilson, Gary Sullivan, Joe Pags, Art Bell and Bill Cunningham.
