= Riverbanks Zoo and Garden =

Zoo, aquarium, and botanical garden in Columbia, South Carolina, United States

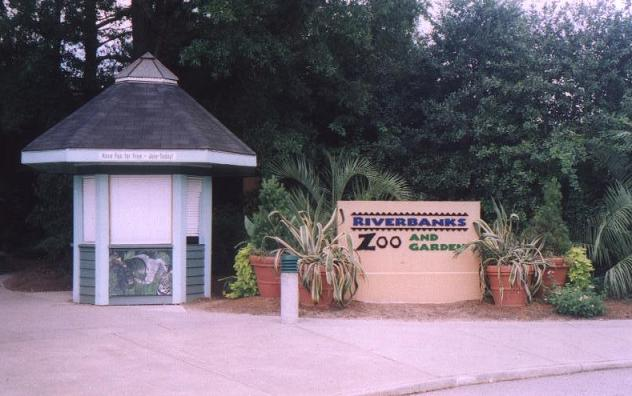
- Entrance to Riverbanks Zoo and Garden
- Interactive map of Riverbanks Zoo and Garden
- 34.009651°N 81.072436°W
- Date opened: April 25, 1974; 52 years ago
- Location: Columbia and West Columbia, South Carolina United States
- Land area: 170 acres (69 ha)
- No. of animals: 2,000+
- Annual visitors: 1+ million
- Memberships: AZA
- Major exhibits: African Plains, Aquarium, Sea Lion Landing, Reptile Complex, Riverbanks Farm
- Owner: Rich-Lex Riverbanks Park Special Purpose District
- Website: www.riverbanks.org

The Riverbanks Zoo and Garden is a 170-acre (69 ha) zoo, aquarium, and botanical garden located along the Saluda River in Columbia, South Carolina, United States. A small portion of the zoo extends into the nearby city of West Columbia. It is operated by the Rich-Lex Riverbanks Park Special Purpose District, a partnership of the city of Columbia and Richland and Lexington counties. It is overseen by the Riverbanks Park Commission, comprising two members each from the three governments and one at-large member.

Riverbanks Zoo and Garden is an accredited member of the Association of Zoos and Aquariums (AZA).

== History ==
In the early 1960s, Columbia-area businessmen conceived of a zoo for the state capital. However, the idea did not get beyond the planning stages until 1969, when the state created the Rich-Lex Riverbanks Park Special Purpose District to run the proposed zoo. The zoo opened on April 25, 1974 after 5 years of planning. The planning stage was crucial because of the rich history surrounding the property, including four archeological sites. Within two years, it was obvious that the zoo would not be self-supporting, and the Riverbanks Zoological Society was created to help raise money for the zoo. At the same time, Palmer "Satch" Krantz was appointed executive director. Notable features of the original Zoo design were the mountainous, moated exhibits for big cats and bears.

Riverbanks Zoo and Garden is South Carolina's largest gated attraction, averaging over one million visitors each year—a considerable amount for a zoo serving a region as small as Columbia (the Columbia metropolitan area has only 800,000 people). Riverbanks is a four-time winner of the Southeastern Tourism Society's Shining Example Award as the Southeast's top tourist attraction and a two-time winner of the SC Parks Recreation and Tourism Governor's Cup Award as South Carolina's Leading Attraction.

== Animals and exhibits ==
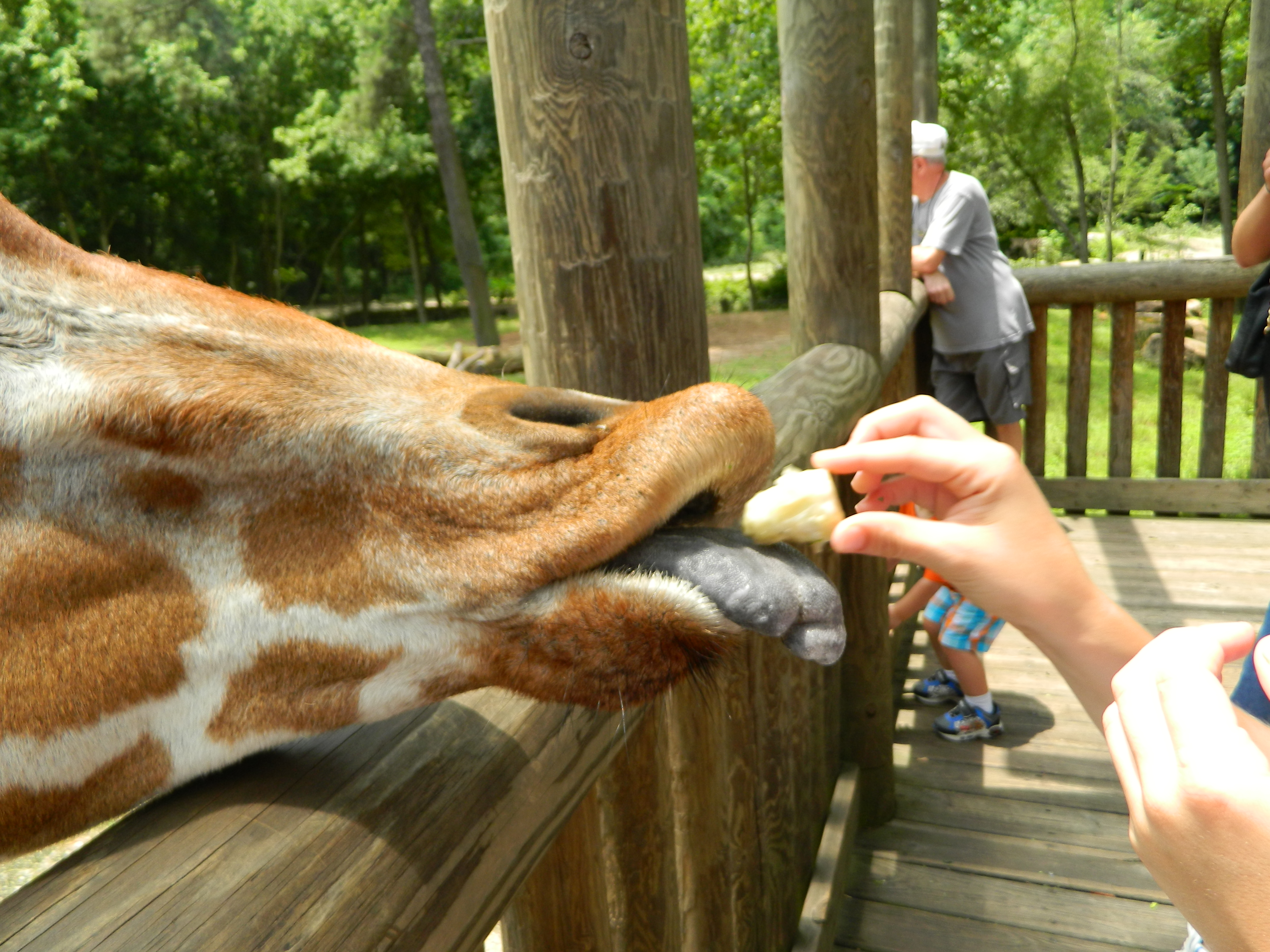
A giraffe being fed at an overlook in 'Africa Plains'.

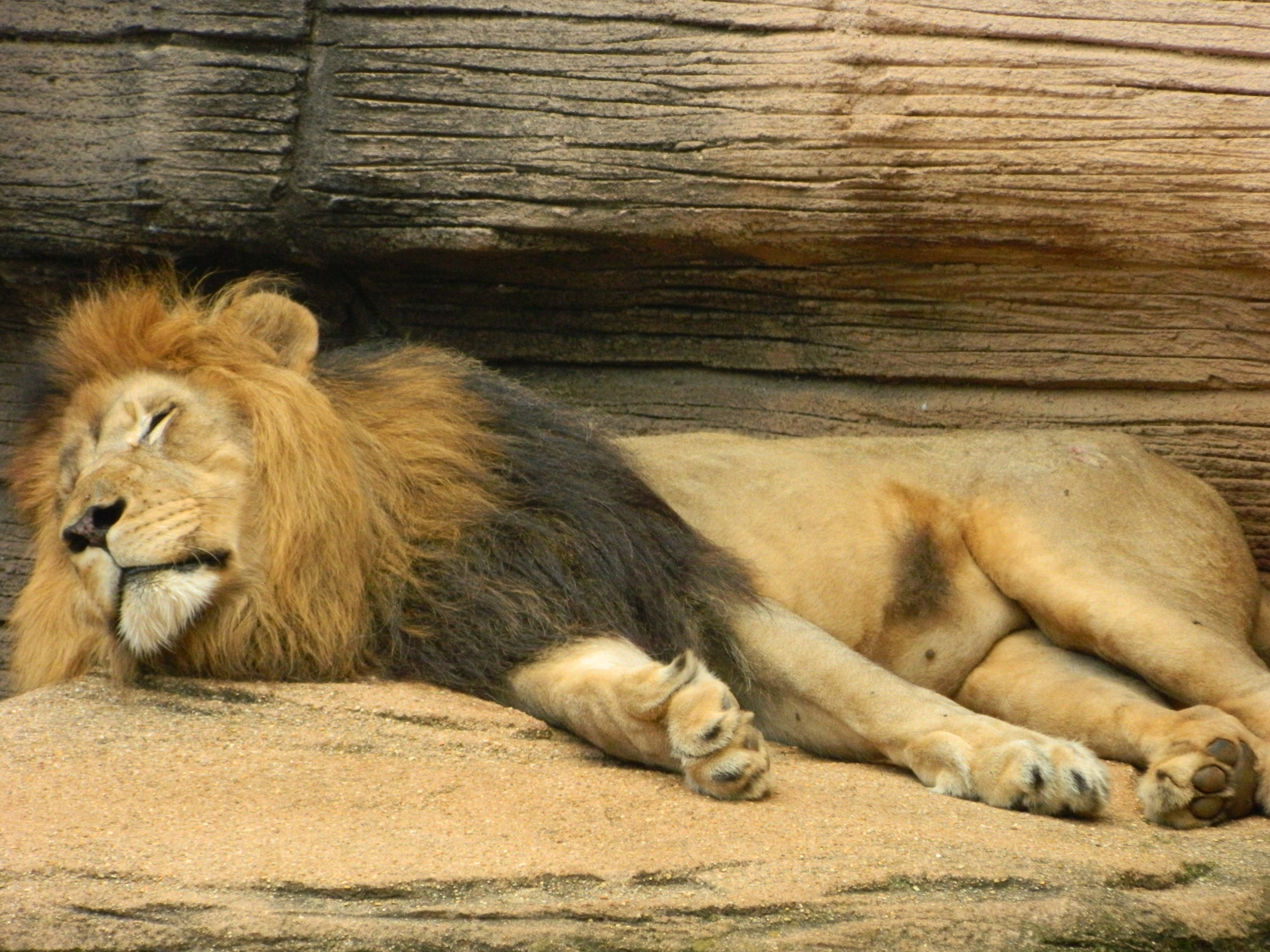
A male lion at Riverbanks

The zoo is home to over 2,000 animals, with collections of mammals, birds, reptiles, and fish. In 2002, additions included exhibits for African elephants, gorillas, and koalas. The Birdhouse at Riverbanks (opened 2001) was given a Significant Achievement Award by the AZA as one of the best new zoo exhibits in the United States, and features a display of king, rockhopper, and gentoo penguins. The Zoo 2002 plan cost $15 million.

African Plains is a 2-acre (0.81 ha) pair of exhibits featuring giraffe (including a paid feeding station), as well as Grant's zebra, and ostrich in the other.

The Aquarium Reptile Complex (opened in 1989 as part of the Zoo II plan) is a 20,000-square-foot (1,900 m^{2}) building with a 50,000-U.S.-gallon (190,000 L) tank for Pacific coral reef species, as well as exhibits for Galapagos tortoises, false gharials, Komodo dragons, and other reptiles. There is a Galapagos tortoise sculpture next to it. In September 2021, the complex was closed for one year in order to undergo major revisions.

Opened in 2002, Ndoki Forest was designed to house two of the larger African species, the African elephant and western lowland gorilla, as well as slender-tailed meerkat, various birds, and formerly de Brazza's monkeys. The elephants once lived in a 1/2-acre (0.20 ha) renovated yard with a 250,000-U.S.-gallon (950,000 L) pool. As of November 20, 2019 the last elephant was transported to the Milwaukee County Zoo in Wisconsin. The closing of the elephant exhibit made room for a Southern white rhino exhibit, opened in summer of 2020.

Riverbanks Farm (opened in 1988) contains domestic animals and allows guests to feed the zoo's goats and alpacas. Lemur Island was a former exhibit including ring-tailed lemurs and red ruffed lemurs, later replaced by the rebuilt sea lion exhibit. Conservation Outpost features threatened species such as golden lion tamarins, fishing cats, and the aforementioned lemurs. In 1983, the Education Center opened for Zoo Camp.

Kangaroo Walkabout is another modern addition. It has a path leading into the exhibit where visitors can view wallabies and red kangaroos without a barrier between them. However, visitors cannot stray from the path.

The Riverbanks Zoo added a Malayan tapir on January 18, 2013, since deceased; as well as a breeding pair of North Sulawesi babirusas in 2012. The babirusas have successfully been bred and can be found in the previous warthog exhibit.

In June 2016, a new sea lion and harbor seal exhibit was opened, which is modeled after San Francisco's Pier 39. This new exhibit includes four sea lions and one harbor seal in a 250,000-gallon saltwater habitat. Around that time the newly renovated entrance, renovated otter exhibit, and renovated grizzly bear exhibit also opened. This was all part of the zoo's $36 million Destination Riverbanks plan. Additionally, a children's garden opened in 2016, complete with a dinosaur digging area and water features to interact with. This garden has been the largest addition to the zoo since the botanical garden in 1995.

Separate exhibits include Hamadryas baboons, lions, Siberian tiger, meerkats, alligators, and siamangs.

In May 2022, Riverbanks announced their new Bridge to the Wild plan, which aims to extend the zoo into the gardens. Plans include a new restaurant, as well as new species including orangutans, gibbons, red wolves, American black bears, and golden eagles. Phase two of this plan was approved in December 2023, with approximately $80 million invested from both Richland county and Lexington county. This project is planned to have a significant impact on tourism, local education, and potential job opportunities.

The last original animal who had been there since the zoo's opening, a female Caribbean flamingo, died in March 2014. Its residential lionesses, Lindelani and Thabisa, were transferred to Wildlife Safari in early November of 2025. A month later, two male African lions, Pesho and Sidai, arrived from Lincoln Park Zoo.

== Botanical garden ==
Riverbanks also has a 70-acre (28 ha) botanical garden (opened on June 10, 1995 at the cost of $6 million) with more than 4,200 species of native and exotic plants, and some sculptures. A trail system lets visitors explore several kilometers of bottomland and upland mixed hardwood forests in search of the native wildlife that call the Zoo and Garden home.

== Waterfall Junction ==
Waterfall Junction (opened in April 2016) is a children's play area that includes a splashpad, playground, playhouses, and more.

== Gallery ==
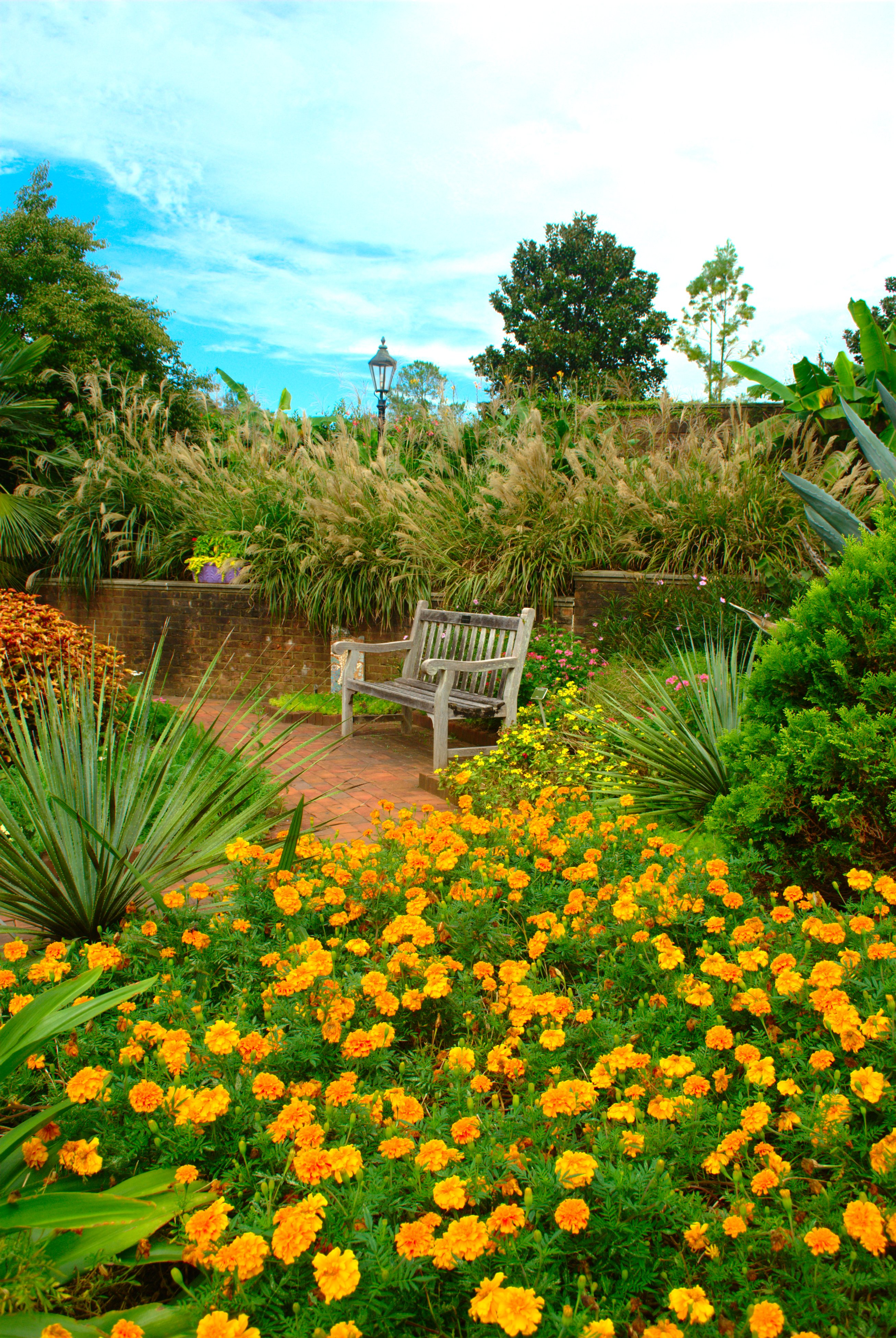
Bench in a part of the Botanical Garden.

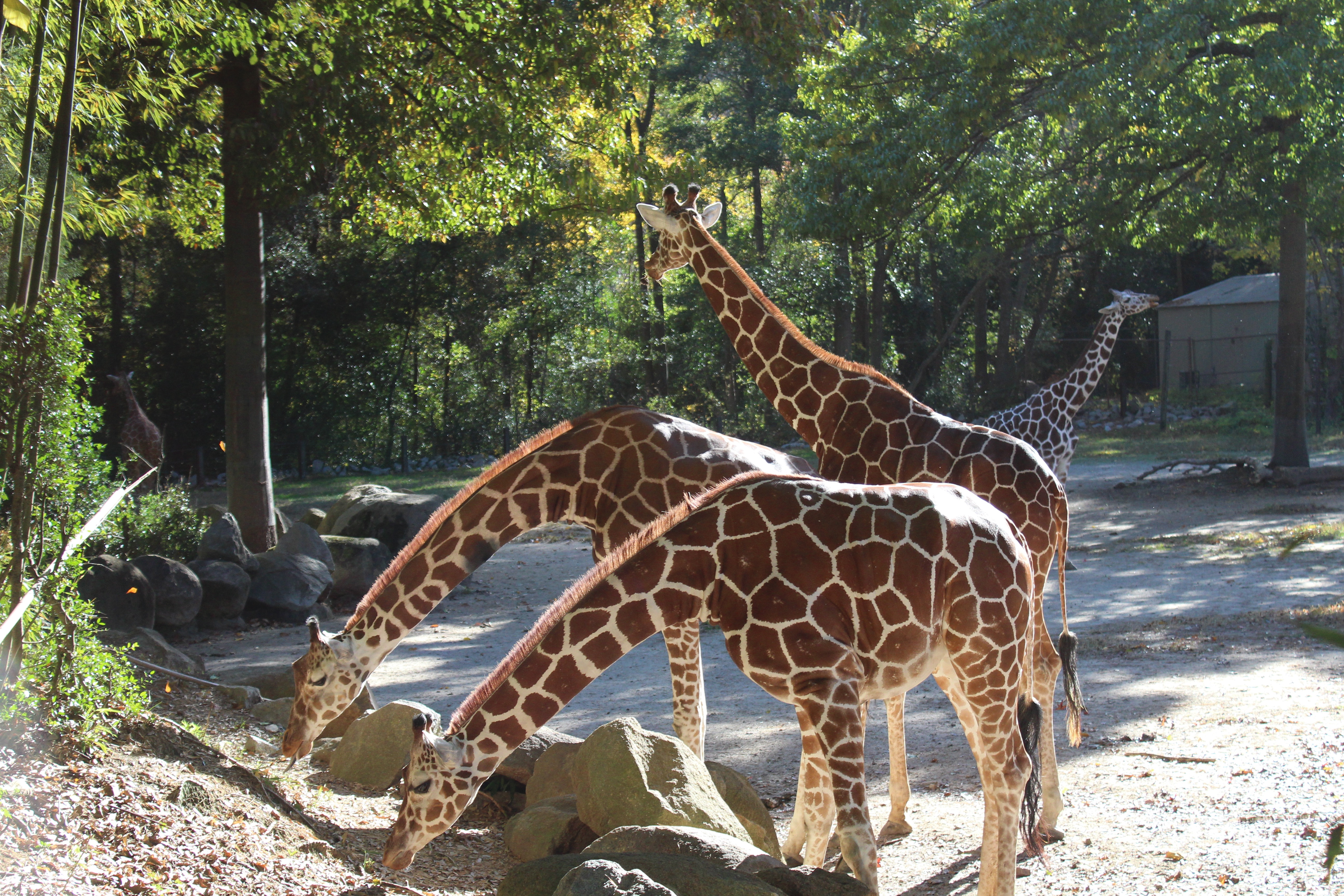
Giraffes.

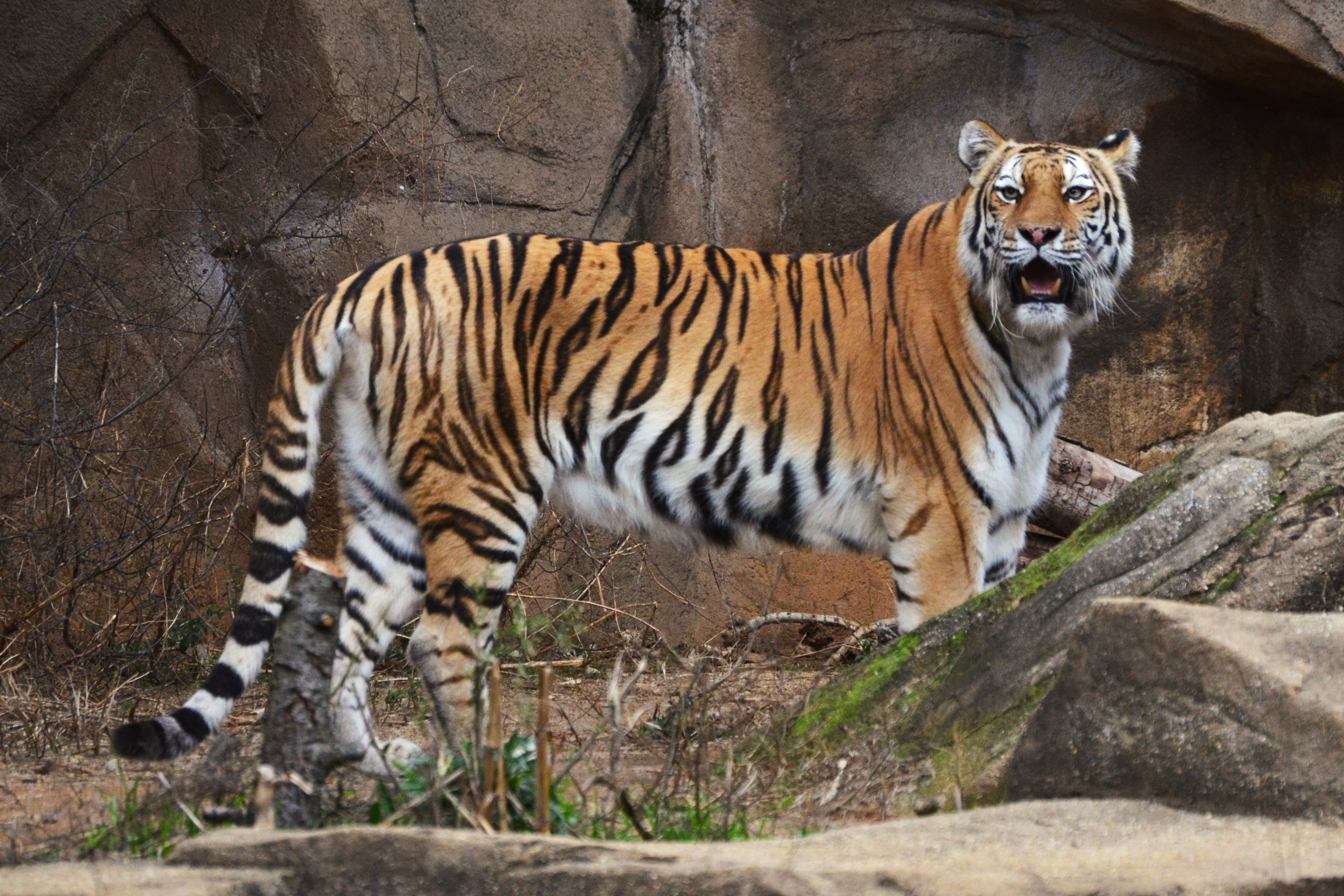
Siberian tiger.

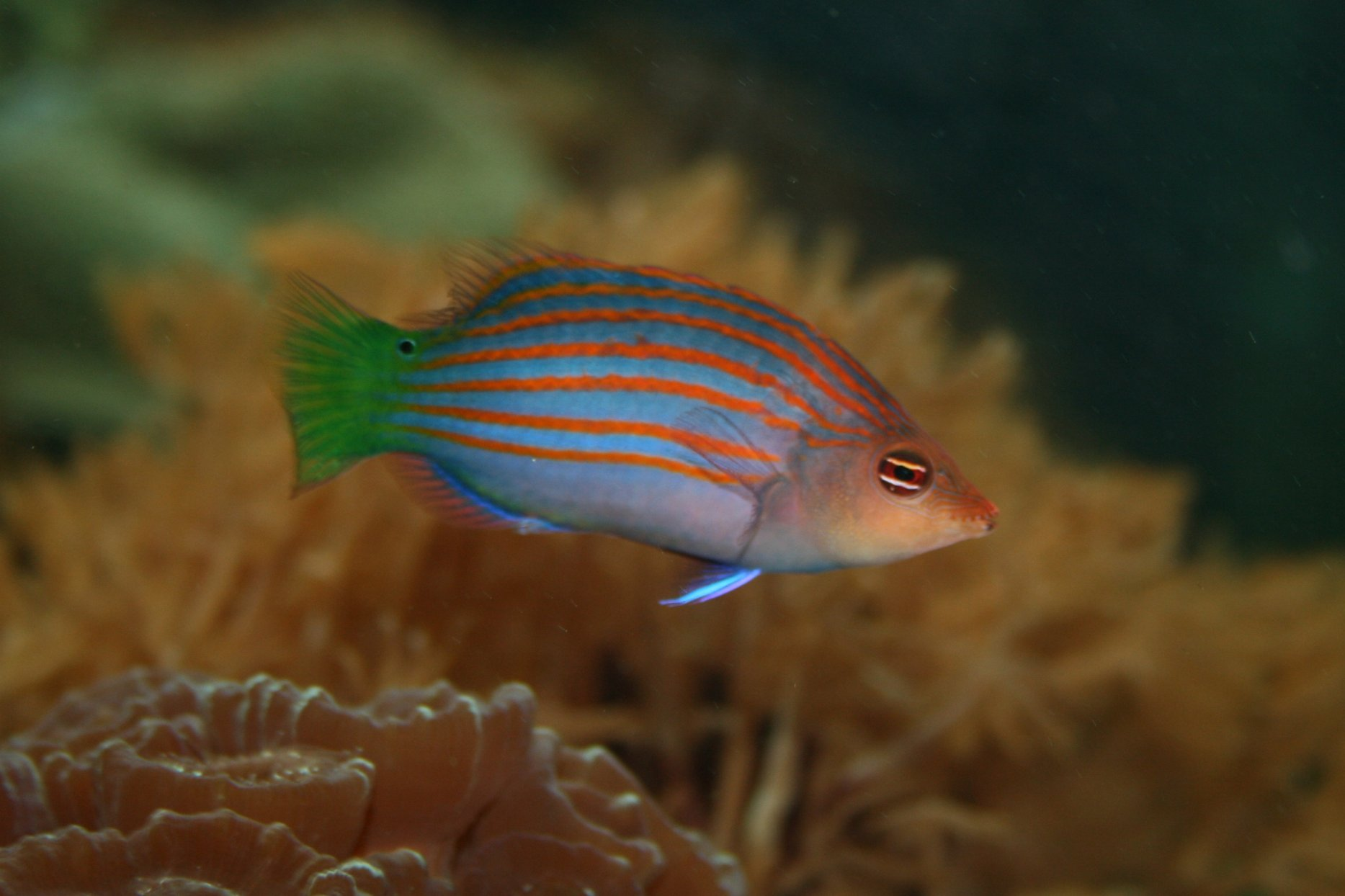
Six-line wrasse (Pseudocheilinus hexataenia), one of the many fishes in the aquarium area.

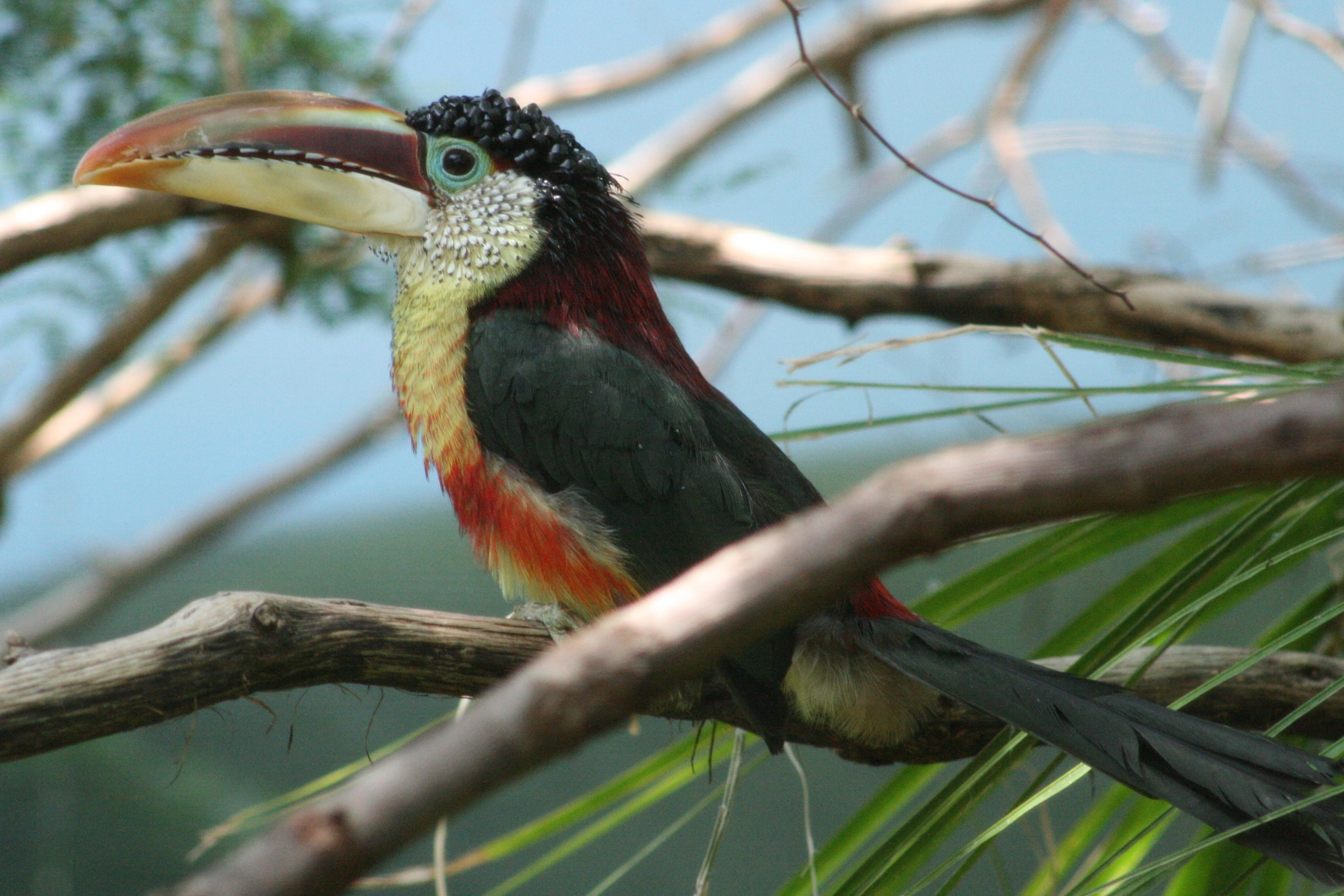
Curl-crested aracari (Pteroglossus beauharnaisii).

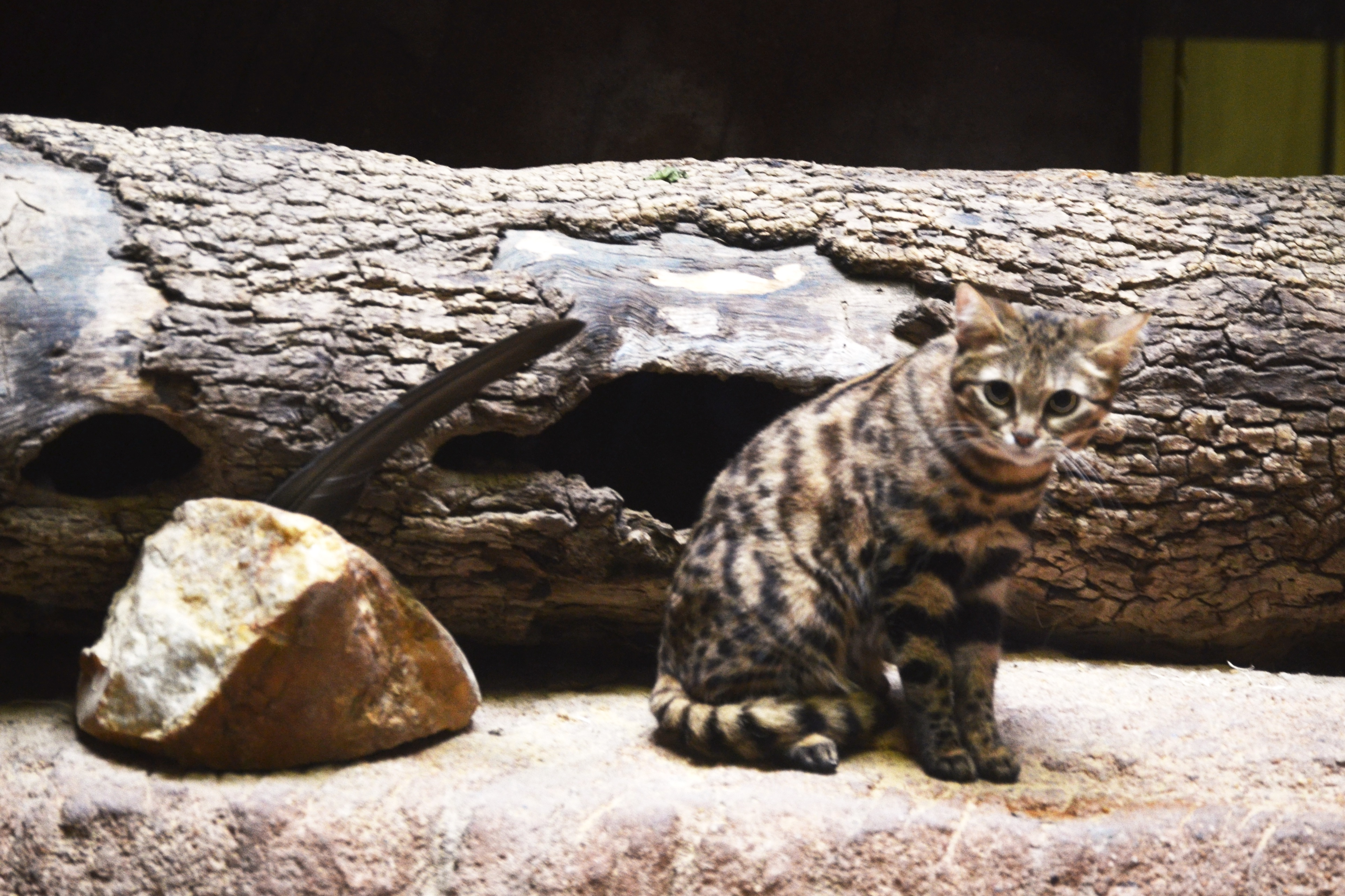
Smallest wild cat in Africa, the black-footed cat (Felis nigripes).

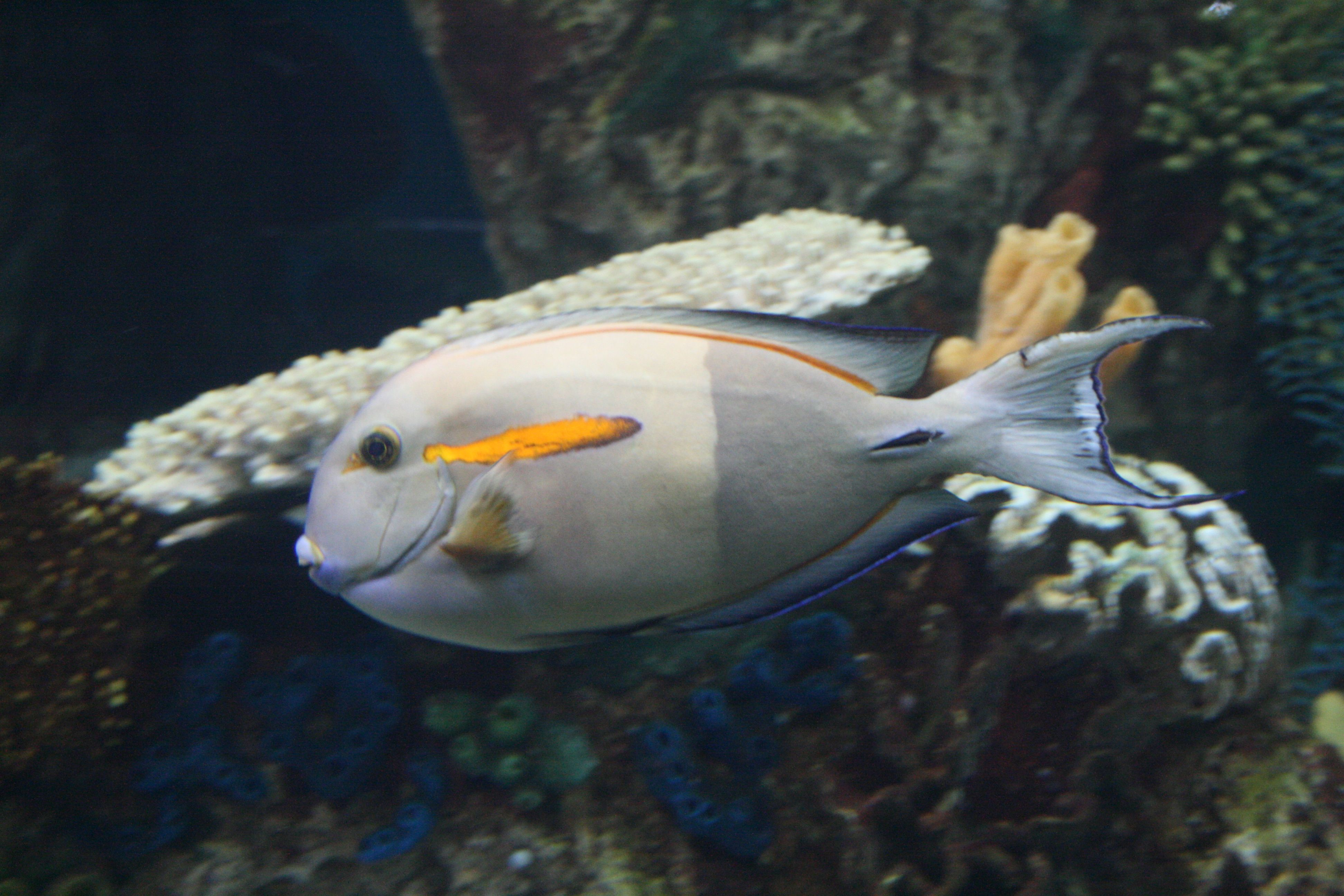
Orange-shoulder surgeonfish (Acanthurus olivaceus) in an aquarium.

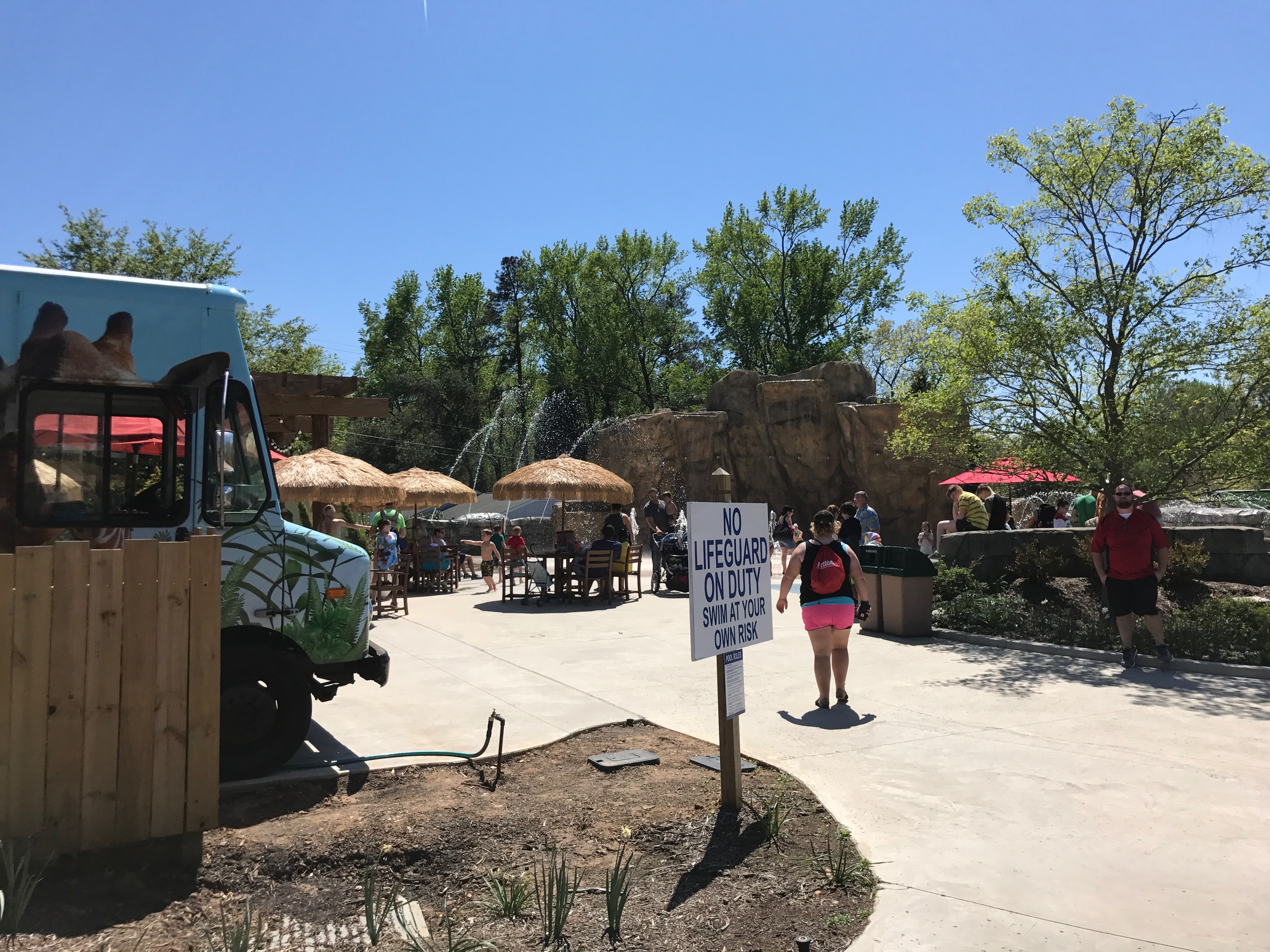
Waterfall Junction, children's play area.

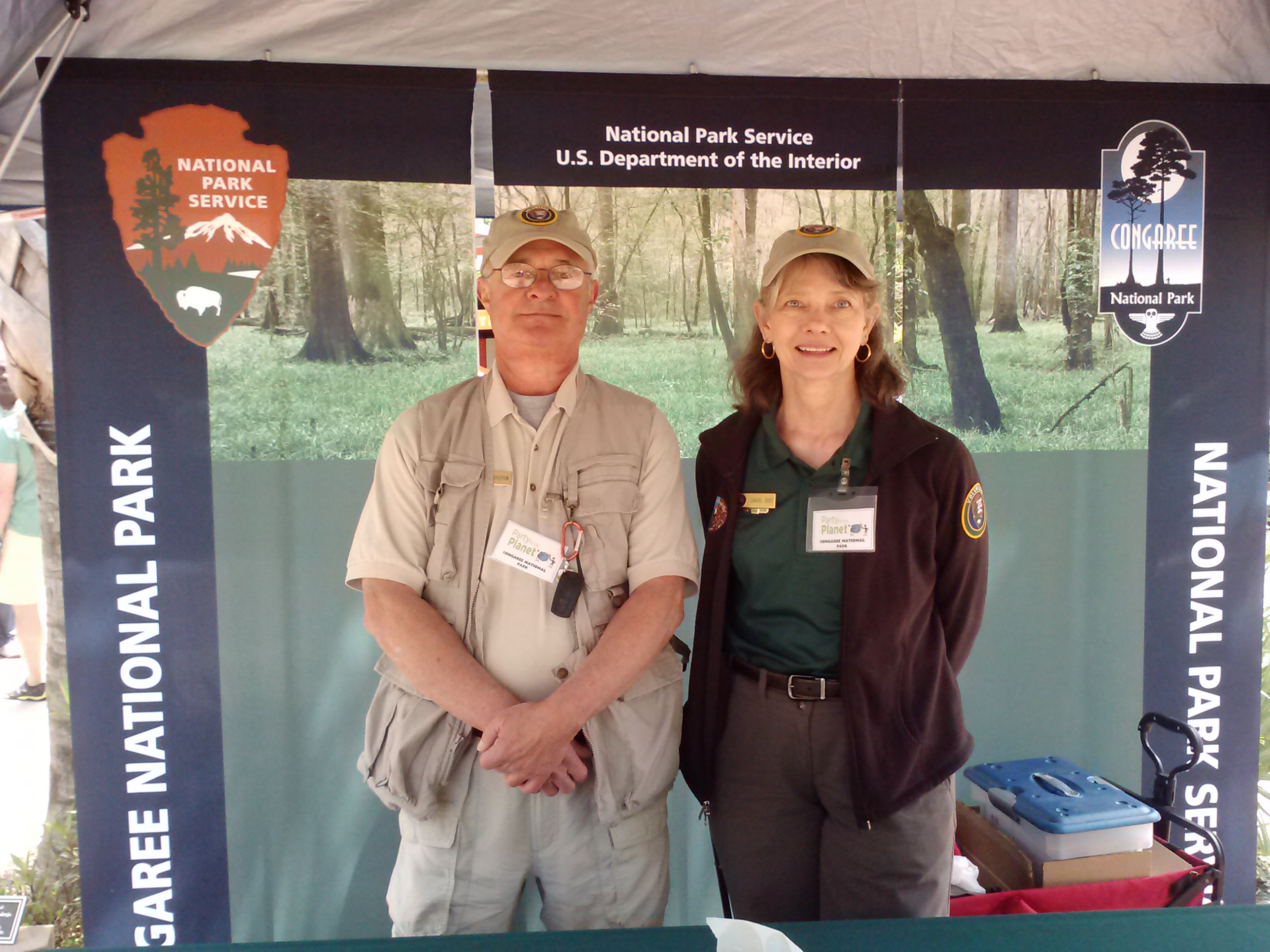
National Park Service with an information booth for the Congaree National Park at the Riverbanks Zoo Earth Day celebration.

== See also ==
- List of botanical gardens in the United States
