= Interstate 126 =

Highway in South Carolina

Interstate 126
- Lester Bates Freeway
- I-126 highlighted in red

Route information
- Auxiliary route of I-26
- Maintained by SCDOT
- Length: 3.68 mi (5.92 km)
- Existed: 1961–present
- NHS: Entire route

Major junctions
- West end: I-26 / US 76 in Columbia
- East end: US 21 / US 76 / US 176 / US 321 in Downtown Columbia

Location
- Country: United States
- State: South Carolina
- Counties: Richland

Highway system
- Interstate Highway System; Main; Auxiliary; Suffixed; Business; Future; South Carolina State Highway System; Interstate; US; State; Scenic
| ← SC 125 | → SC 126 |

Interstate 126 (I-126) is a spur route of I-26 entirely within the city limits of Columbia in the US state of South Carolina. It is entirely concurrent with U.S. Route 76 (US 76) and connects I-26 to Downtown Columbia. It is 3.68 miles (5.92 km) long and has three unnumbered interchanges between its junction with I-26 and its terminus at Gadsden Street. The Riverbanks Zoo is a major attraction on I-126.

== Route description ==
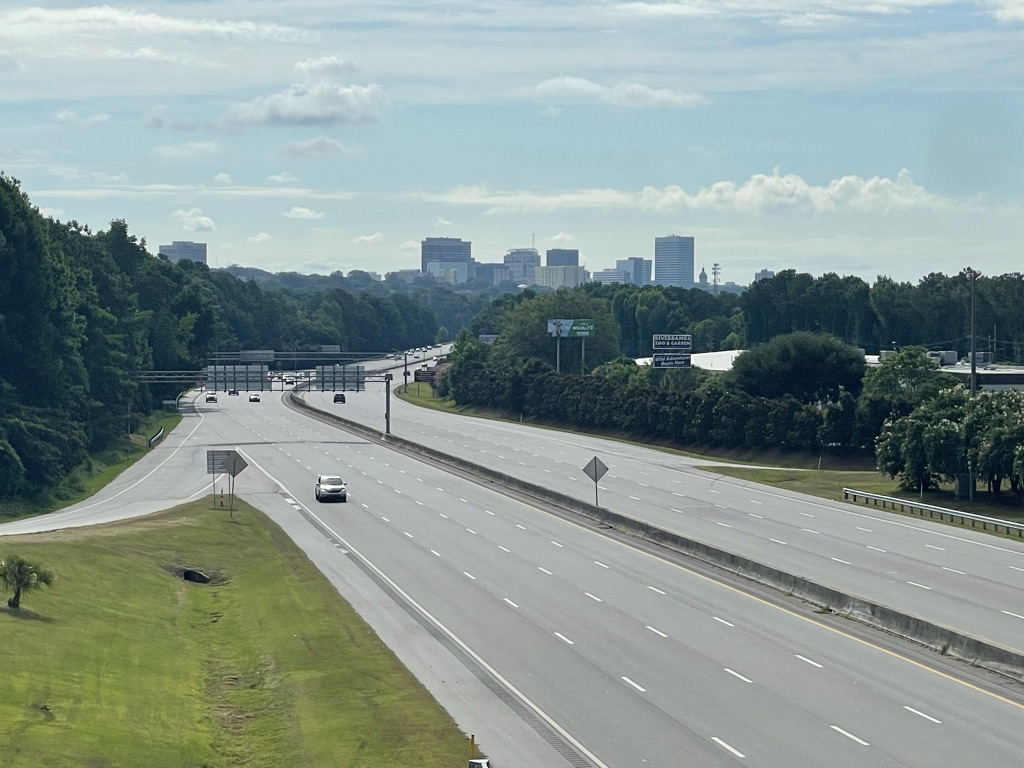
I-126 with Columbia, South Carolina skyline

I-126 begins in northwestern Columbia at an interchange with parent route I-26 and US 76 along the Saluda River. The terminus is located near the Dutch Square shopping center and I-26's own interchange with I-20, nicknamed "Malfunction Junction", which includes a weaving ramp from I-126's westbound lanes to I-20. The eight-lane freeway travels southeast along the Saluda River and passes the Riverbanks Zoo at Greystone Boulevard. It then crosses over the Broad River on the Timmerman Bridge near the mouth of the Saluda River. I-126 enters Downtown Columbia and reaches its easternmost interchange with Huger Street, which carries US 21, US 176, and US 321. The freeway continues east for several blocks on Elmwood Avenue, which carries the highways that Huger Street did, and ends at Gadsden Street near the South Carolina Governor's Mansion.

I-126 is officially named the Lester Bates Freeway for former Columbia mayor Lester Bates. All of its exits are unnumbered. The entire length of the freeway is concurrent with US 76, which continues west on I-26 towards Georgia and east to North Carolina.

== History ==
Construction started on I-126 in 1959, and it was completed in 1961 as a four-lane freeway spur of I-26. The last sections of both freeways opened on May 16, 1961, as part of National Highway Week. In the early 1980s, it was widened to six lanes from I-26 to Greystone Boulevard and eight lanes from there to Huger Street. By the 1990s, a lane was added eastbound from Colonial Life Boulevard to Greystone Boulevard and westbound from Greystone Boulevard to a new I-20 exit just before its western terminus. The eastern terminus of I-126 has fluctuated between Huger Street and Gadsden Street.

I-126 was designated the Lester Bates Freeway in April 1986 in honor of former Columbia mayor Lester Bates, who served three terms in the 1960s.

In 2025, as part of the Carolina Crossroads project, phase 1 was completed, rerouting the Bush River Road exit to Colonial Life Boulevard, as well as revamping interchange routes between I-26 westbound to I-126 eastbound.

== Future ==
=== I-20/I-26 interchange ===
The South Carolina Department of Transportation (SCDOT), in cooperation with the Federal Highway Administration (FHWA), is in the process of implementing improvements to the Interstate corridor of I-20/I-26/I-126, including the system interchanges at I-20/I-26 and I-26/I-126 in Lexington and Richland counties, designated as the "Carolina Crossroads" project. These improvements are proposed to increase mobility and enhance traffic operations by reducing existing traffic congestion within the I-20/I-26/I-126 corridor, while accommodating future traffic needs. The corridor's approximately 14 miles (23 km) of mainline Interstate include I-26 from exit 101 (Broad River Road/US 176) to east of the Saluda River, I-20 from the west of the Saluda River to west of the Broad River, and I-126 from I-26 to east of the interchange with Colonial Life Boulevard. The improvements for I-126 are partially complete, and the remaining work dealing with the I-126/I-26 merge interchange (Stage 3D/3E) are expected to begin construction in 2029.

== Exit list ==
All exits are unnumbered except the second exit on the eastbound lanes. The entire route is in Columbia, Richland County.

| mi | km | Exit | Destinations | Notes |
|---|---|---|---|---|
| 0.000– 0.316 | 0.000– 0.509 | — | I-26 / US 76 west to I-20 – Charleston, Spartanburg, Augusta, Florence | Western terminus; western end of US 76 concurrency; I-20 exit 64; I-26 exit 108 |
| 0.801 | 1.289 | 108A | Colonial Life Boulevard to Bush River Road | Exit number based on using I-26 exit numbering, only showed on eastbound; no exit number on westbound |
| 1.850 | 2.977 | — | Greystone Boulevard – Riverbanks Zoo | |
| 3.346– 3.360 | 5.385– 5.407 | — | US 21 south / US 176 east / US 321 south (Huger Street) | Western end of US 21/US 176/US 321 concurrency |
| 3.680 | 5.922 | — | US 21 north / US 76 east / US 176 west / US 321 north / Gadsden Street | Eastern terminus; eastern end of US 21/US 176/US 321 and US 76 concurrencies |
1.000 mi = 1.609 km; 1.000 km = 0.621 mi: Concurrency terminus; Incomplete access

== Interstate 126 Business ==
Interstate 126 Business
- Location: Columbia, South Carolina
- Length: 0.9 mi (1,400 m)

Interstate 126 Business (I-126 Bus) was a boulevard-grade business spur of I-126 along Elmwood Avenue between Huger Street and Bull Street in concurrence with US 21/US 76/US 176/US 321. The route was never marked on state, county, or city highway maps. Signage proliferated along the westbound route in the late 1970s from Bull Street to Assembly Street. These signs were added with a major signage overhaul on Elmwood Avenue around 1978 when US 21/US 176/US 321 were moved from Assembly Street to Huger Street, SC 215 was removed from the route and SC 48 was extended up Assembly Street to Elmwood Avenue. However, by 2000, only one sign remained, and this was gone by the mid-2000s. At some point, I-126 absorbed part of the business spur from Huger Street to Gadsden Street. It is considered decommissioned as no current state or federal maps list it nor does any physical signage exist.
