= WDKD =

- Kingstree, South Carolina; United States
- Frequency: 1310 kHz
- Branding: 97.1 Frank FM

Programming
- Format: Defunct (was Classic hits)

Ownership
- Owner: Community Broadcasters, LLC
- Sister stations: WFRK, WOLH, WPDT, WSIM, WWBD, WWKT

History
- First air date: July 1949

Technical information
- Licensing authority: FCC
- Facility ID: 15835
- Class: D
- Power: 5,000 watts (day); 60 watts (night)
- Transmitter coordinates: 33°42′12″N 79°48′58″W

Links
- Public license information: Public file; LMS
- Webcast: Listen Live
- Website: cbpeedee.com/frank971/

WDKD was a radio station at 1310 AM and licensed to Kingstree, South Carolina, United States. Last owned by Community Broadcasters, LLC, it last aired on the programming of W246BX, or "97.1 Frank FM", the HD-2 channel of WSIM.

== History ==
WDKD previously simulcast WSIM, which was an oldies station with the slogan "good time rock and roll," which later became an adult contemporary station.

Then it simulcast 97.1 Frank FM, which was a WSIM HD-2 channel but moved to full-power WFRK.

Community Broadcasters surrendered WDKD's license to the Federal Communications Commission on November 16, 2021, which cancelled it the same day. Due to that, W246BX started simulcasting WTQS.
