= Clemson Tigers Network =

Collegiate sports radio network

- Company type: Private
- Industry: Sports Marketing, Television and Radio Production and Broadcasting
- Headquarters: Clemson, SC, USA
- Key people: Gerry Dickey
- Parent: Clemson Tigers Sports Properties, JMI Sports
- Website: http://www.ClemsonTigers.com

Clemson Tigers Network is a subsidiary of Clemson Tigers Sports Properties and is the official media rights holder for Clemson University athletics. It is operated by JMI Sports, with distribution operations handled at WCCP-FM in Clemson, South Carolina. Prior to 2017, when the network was known as Clemson Tigers Sports Network, CTSN was operated by Learfield Sports.

== Television ==
=== Coach's Show ===
CTSN produces a weekly coach's show for football and basketball. Hosted by Pete Yanity, the show reviews the past week's activity in each sport. The coach plays an active role on the show discussing the team's performance.

Call Sign	City, State	Date, Time
W30CV-D	Hilton Head, SC	Sundays, 11:00AM
WFXB	Myrtle Beach, SC	Sundays, 11:00AM
WCIV	Charleston, SC	Sundays, 11:30AM
WOLO	Columbia, SC	Sundays, Noon
WAGT-CD	Augusta, GA	Sundays, 12:30PM
WMYA	Greenville, SC	Sundays, 1:30PM
CN2	Rock Hill, SC	Tuesdays, 7:30PM & 11:30PM; Wednesdays, 7:30PM & 11:30PM
Sun Sports	Orlando, FL	Wednesdays, 4:30PM
CSS	Southern United States	Wednesdays, 5:30PM
Fox Sports Net	Southern United States	Fridays, 1:00PM

== Radio ==
CTSN is available on a wide range of radio stations across the southeast, namely South Carolina. All Football and Men's Basketball games are also broadcast nationwide on XM Satellite Radio as well as Sirius Satellite Radio for those with the "Best of XM" package.

Frequency	Call Sign	City, State	Football	Basketball		Baseball	Coach's Shows	Stream Link
Frequency	Call Sign	City, State	Football	Men's	Women's	Baseball	Coach's Shows	Stream Link
1390 AM	WABB	Belton, SC	Yes	No	No	No	No	
1590 AM	WCAM	Camden, SC	Yes	Yes	No	No	Yes	
102.7 FM	WPUB	Camden, SC	Partial	Partial	No	No	Partial	
1340 AM	WQSC	Charleston, SC	Yes	Yes	Yes	Yes	Partial	
105.5 FM	WCCP-FM	Clemson, SC	Yes	Yes	Yes	Yes	Yes	
1410 AM	WPCC	Clinton, SC	Partial	Partial	Partial	Partial	Partial	
93.1 FM	WZMJ	Columbia, SC	Yes	Yes	Yes	Yes	Yes	
97.5 FM	W248DD	Cowpens, SC	Yes	Yes	Yes	Yes	Yes	
1560 AM	WAHT	Cowpens, SC	Yes	Yes	Yes	Yes	Yes	
1450 AM	WGNC	Gastonia, NC	No	Yes	No	No	No	
1470 AM	WPIF	Georgetown, SC	Yes	No	No	No	Yes	
93.3 FM	WTPT	Greenville, SC	Yes	No	No	No	Partial	
94.1 FM	WGFJ	Greenville, SC	Yes	No	No	No	No	
1270 AM	WHGS	Hampton, SC	Yes	No	No	Yes	Yes	
1130 AM	WHHW	Hilton Head, SC	Yes	No	No	No	No	
1050 AM	WLON	Lincolnton, NC	No	Yes	No	No	No	
94.9 FM	WVCO	Loris, SC (Myrtle Beach market)	Yes	Yes	No	No	No	
1240 AM	WKDK	Newberry, SC	Yes	Yes	No	Yes	Yes	
105.1 FM	WGFG	Branchville, SC	Yes	Yes	No	No	Yes	
102.9 FM	WQKI-FM	Orangeburg, SC	Yes	Yes	Yes	No	Partial	
1340 AM	WRHI	Rock Hill, SC	Yes	Yes	No	No	Yes	
94.3 FM	W232AX	Rock Hill, SC	Yes	Yes	No	No	Yes	
1390 AM	WOHS	Shelby, NC	No	Yes	No	No	No	
730 AM	WZGV	Shelby, NC	No	Yes	No	No	No	
94.7 FM	WWBD	Sumter, SC	Yes	Yes	No	No	Yes	
1460 AM	WBCU	Union, SC	Yes	Yes	No	Yes	Yes	

== See also ==
- Clemson University
- Clemson Tigers
