= WJTB-FM =

Radio station in South Congaree, South Carolina

- South Congaree, South Carolina; United States
- Broadcast area: Columbia metropolitan area
- Frequency: 95.3 MHz
- Branding: GNN Radio

Programming
- Format: Christian radio
- Affiliations: GNNradio

Ownership
- Owner: Augusta Radio Fellowship Institute, Inc.

History
- First air date: October 29, 1993
- Former call signs: WFMV (1993–2019); WFMV-FM (2019–2020)

Technical information
- Licensing authority: FCC
- Facility ID: 24376
- Class: A
- ERP: 6,000 watts
- HAAT: 93.7 meters (307 ft)
- Transmitter coordinates: 33°53′58″N 81°13′29″W
- Translator: HD2: 105.1 W286CT (Columbia)

Links
- Public license information: Public file; LMS
- Website: gnnradio.org

WJTB-FM (95.3 FM, "GNN Radio") is a commercial Christian radio station licensed to South Congaree, South Carolina, United States. Owned by Augusta Radio Fellowship Institute, Inc., the station services the Columbia metropolitan area and surrounding Midlands region as an affiliate of GNN Radio. The WJTB-FM studios are located in Downtown Columbia while the station transmitter resides in Red Bank. In addition to a standard analog transmission, WJTB-FM broadcasts over three HD Radio channels, and is available online. The WJTB-HD2 digital subchannel, which airs the "Worship and Word Network", and the WJTB-HD3 digital subchannel, which airs the "Millennial-FM Network", also simulcast over low-power FM translators.

== History ==
In early 1991, WKWQ, later known as WZMJ, changed frequencies from 95.3 to 93.1, leaving the 95.3 frequency open. The frequency was reallocated to South Congaree by the FCC and after two years, the license was awarded to Glory Communications, a group led by former WWDM sales manager/media specialist Alex Snipe. The station signed on the air on October 29, 1993, as WFMV. It carried an urban contemporary gospel format. The call letters, WFMV, had been previously assigned to an FM radio station in Blairstown, New Jersey.

WFMV offered mostly contemporary black gospel music with some classic artists such as CeCe Winans, Smokie Norful, Mary Mary, Shirley Caesar, John P. Kee, The Georgia Mass Choir, and Kirk Franklin. Informational programming included The Morning Inspirations, Wellness Watch, Real Power (for voters), Kid's Korner and Watchdog (for consumers); on weekends, I-95 covered community issues.

WFMV was part of the Glory Radio Network along with WTUA, WLJI, WPDT and WSPX. WFMV was named Southeast Music Award station of the year in 1995. On March 24, 1997, WLJI, in Summerton, South Carolina, signed on the air as a full-time simulcast of WFMV.

The station changed its call sign to WFMV-FM on November 13, 2019, which allowed WGCV (620 AM) to take the WFMV call letters.

On February 11, 2020, the sale of WFMV-FM by Glory Communications to Augusta Radio Fellowship Institute, Inc. for $2 million was consummated. The station simultaneously switched its call letters to WJTB-FM and began carrying programming from the Good News Network. The Urban Gospel format heard on WFMV-FM had moved to WFMV earlier in the month.

=== FM translators ===
WJTB-FM's HD-2 subchannel feeds FM translator station W286CT (105.1 FM), airing the "Worship & Word Network."

Broadcast translator for WJTB-FM
Call sign	Frequency	City of license	FID	ERP (W)	HAAT	Class	Transmitter coordinates	FCC info
W286CT	105.1 FM	Columbia, South Carolina	147585	99	70.5 m (231 ft)	D	33°57′35″N 81°02′27″W	LMS
