= WIBZ =

WIBZ-FM
- Wedgefield, South Carolina; United States
- Broadcast area: Sumter County, South Carolina
- Frequency: 95.5 MHz
- Branding: Z95.5

Programming
- Format: Adult hits

Ownership
- Owner: Community Broadcasters, LLC
- Sister stations: WWBD, WDXY, WWHM, WWKT-FM

History
- First air date: February 5, 1985; 41 years ago

Technical information
- Licensing authority: FCC
- Facility ID: 55268
- Class: A
- ERP: 4,400 watts
- HAAT: 118 meters
- Transmitter coordinates: 34°1′49″N 80°27′43″W

Links
- Public license information: Public file; LMS
- Webcast: Listen live
- Website: WIBZ Online

WIBZ (95.5 FM, "Z95.5") is a radio station broadcasting an adult hits format focusing on music from the 1960s–2000s. Licensed to Wedgefield, South Carolina, United States, the station is currently owned by Community Broadcasters, LLC. Its studios are located on 51 Commerce St in Sumter, while the transmitter is located on Tower Rd off of W Wesmark Blvd in Sumter as well. It shares its transmitter with W227BI, a translator for WWHM & W206BY, a translator for WXHL. WIBZ broadcasts with an ERP of 4,400 watts, broadcasting only to Sumter and certain communities around it, such as Manning, Bishopville, and Camden.

== History ==
The station went on the air as WIBZ on 1985-02-05.

In the 1970s, WIBZ was "99Z. The Rock of The Valley" delivering album and alternative rock music to the Parkersburg, West Virginia/Marietta, Ohio broadcast market.
