= WFMV =

WFMV may refer to:

- WFMV (AM), a radio station (620 AM) licensed to serve Cayce, South Carolina, United States
- WJTB-FM, a radio station (95.3 FM) licensed to serve South Congaree, South Carolina, which held the call sign WFMV from 1993 to 2019 and WFMV-FM from 2019 to 2020
- WHCY, a radio station (106.3 FM) licensed to serve Blairstown, New Jersey, United States, which held the call sign WFMV-FM from 1973 to 1983 and WFMV from 1983 to 1992
- WURV, a radio station (103.7 FM) licensed to serve Richmond, Virginia, United States, which held the call sign WFMV from 1961 to 1969
