= WLFK =

- Gouverneur, New York; United States
- Broadcast area: Canton, New York
- Frequency: 95.3 MHz
- Branding: 95-3 The Wolf

Programming
- Format: Country music

Ownership
- Owner: Community Broadcasters, LLC
- Sister stations: WATN; WBDR; WEFX; WOTT; WQTK; WSLB; WTOJ

History
- First air date: December 4, 1967
- Former call signs: WIGS-FM (1967–1976); WLUF (1976–1978); WIGS-FM (1978–1988); WGIX-FM (1988–2010)
- Former frequencies: 92.7 MHz (1967–1981)
- Call sign meaning: "Wolf"

Technical information
- Licensing authority: FCC
- Facility ID: 66658
- Class: A
- ERP: 6,000 watts
- HAAT: 100 meters (330 ft)
- Transmitter coordinates: 44°20′22.0″N 75°23′59.2″W

Links
- Public license information: Public file; LMS
- Website: www.cbogdensburg.com/thewolf/

WLFK (95.3 FM, "95-3 The Wolf") is a radio station licensed for 6,000 watts at Gouverneur, New York.

Owned and operated by Community Broadcasters, LLC, it broadcasts a country format. The station carries a national news feed from CNN at the top of each hour. The station has a local disc jockey, Wolfman Bill, (weekdays 6-9 am), and local news courtesy of John Moore at WWTI-TV 50 (Watertown, New York). The remainder of the schedule is filled by satellite, with no local news after that.

The station broadcasts Clarkson University hockey. The announcer is Bob Ahlfeld.

== Station history ==
WLFK signed-on for the first time on Monday evening, December 4, 1967, as WIGS-FM on 92.7 MHz. The 3,000-watt station was put on-the-air to provide coverage to areas that were unable to receive the signal of (or received interference with) the 1,000-watt WIGS (1230 AM). The two stations simulcast originally.

In the fall of 1976, the FM station changed call letters to WLUF. The callsign was changed back to WIGS-FM on December 18, 1978.

According to a story printed in the Gouverneur Tribune-Press, on the evening of March 24, 1977, the three-story building at 40 Church Street, which housed the WIGS-AM-FM studios, plus the Gouverneur Savings & Loan, a law office and real estate office, was totally destroyed by fire. By 1 p.m. the following day, the station had moved temporarily to the back of the Brown and Storie building, returning to the air just five hours later. One part of the burned-out studio that owner Robert Hartshorn did not replace was the old automated machine, nicknamed "Fred", which apparently continued to work right up until it was destroyed in the fire. "Fred" was not popular with listeners, who preferred live talent, unlike the system, which used pre-recorded shows from the west coast. Work soon began on new permanent facilities for the station, with Hartshorn serving as part of the construction crew at the new site next to the transmitter on Pooler Road. Just six weeks later, the new building was nearly ready, at four times the cost of what it took to put WIGS AM on-the-air back in 1963.

Beginning at noon on February 25, 1981, WIGS-FM began broadcasting at its current frequency of 95.3 MHz in order to make room at 92.7 MHz for WPAC (now WQTK) in Ogdensburg, New York. In later years, the simulcast ended, with the AM side going country and the FM taking on an adult contemporary format.

The station callsign changed to WGIX-FM on July 1, 1988.

In February 1991, both stations suddenly left the air but returned with new owners that fall. The Wireless Works had already owned WSLB and WPAC in Ogdensburg, as well as WZOZ in Oneonta, New York. That November, WGIX and WIGS joined WSLB in a new oldies-formatted trimulcast as "FSR - Full-Service Radio". An ad was placed in the Gouverneur newspaper on November 13, 1991, proclaiming "Live radio is back on WIGS and WGIX".

WIGS signed off permanently in the mid-1990s, and the two remaining stations continued a simulcast until WSLB became "Talk 1400" in the early 2000s. WGIX became "Oldies 95.3" then "Cool 95.3".

In 2003, WGIX-FM added a 50-watt repeater in Watertown, New York, which was formerly used by Majic 103.1. Then in 2008, the station added a 19-watt repeater in Lowville.

On Tuesday, March 9, 2010, the station switched formats to country music, re-branding itself as WLFK, "95-3 The Wolf".
