= WTUA =

- St. Stephen, South Carolina; United States
- Frequency: 106.1 MHz
- Branding: "Power 106"

Programming
- Format: Urban Gospel

Ownership
- Owner: Praise Communications, Inc

Technical information
- Licensing authority: FCC
- Facility ID: 23895
- Class: A
- ERP: 6,000 watts
- HAAT: 100 meters
- Transmitter coordinates: 33°29′36″N 79°53′21″W

Links
- Public license information: Public file; LMS
- Website: wtuaradio.com

WTUA (106.1 FM) is a radio station broadcasting an urban gospel format. Licensed to St. Stephen, South Carolina, United States. The station is currently owned by Praise Communications, Inc. and has a permit to move to 105.9 FM.

WTUA is part of the Glory Radio Network along with WLJI, WPDT and WSPX.

== See also ==
- List of radio stations in South Carolina
