= WOIC =

WOIC may refer to:

- WQXL, a radio station (1470 AM) licensed to Columbia, South Carolina, United States, which used the call letters WOIC from 1954 to 1962
- WISW, a radio station (1320 AM) licensed to Columbia, South Carolina, which used the call letters WOIC from 1962 to 1989
- WPCO (South Carolina), a defunct radio station (1230 AM) formerly licensed to Columbia, South Carolina, which used the call sign WOIC from 1989 to 2018
- WUSA (TV), a television station (channel 9 digital) licensed to Washington, D.C., United States, which used the call sign WOIC from 1949 to 1950
