= WQXL =

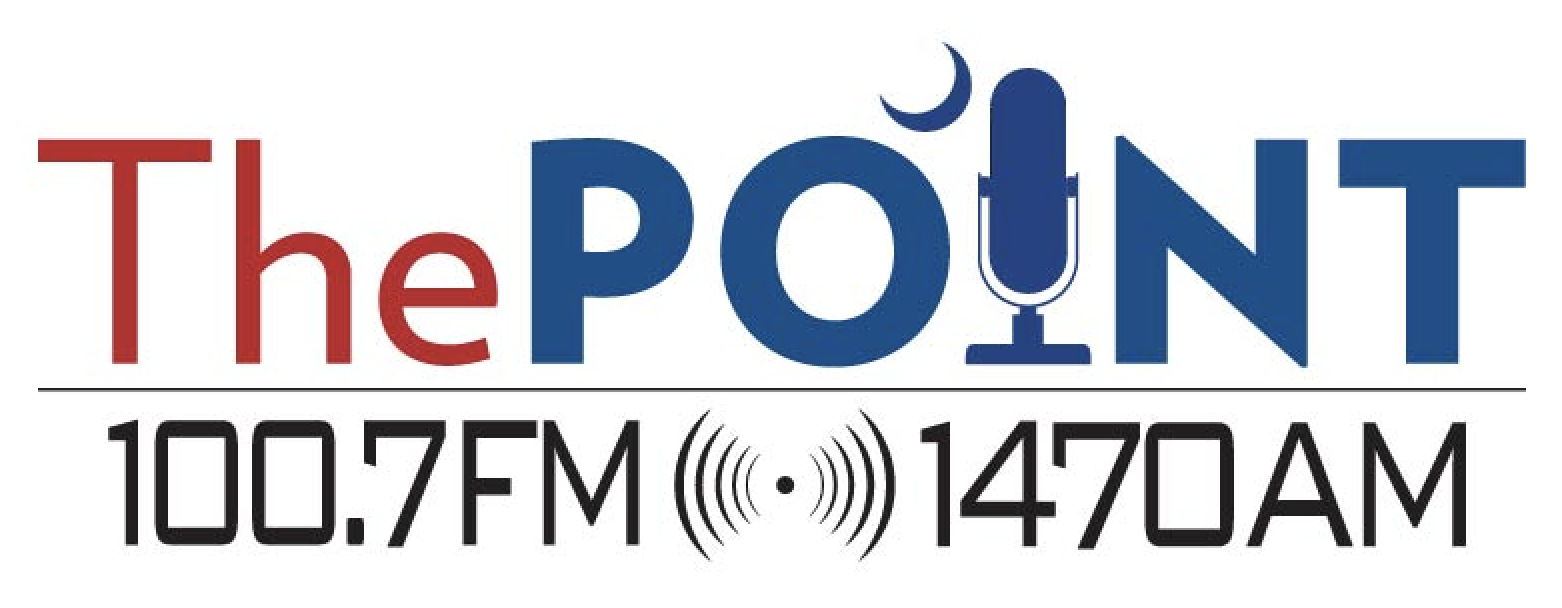
- Columbia, South Carolina; United States
- Broadcast area: Columbia metropolitan area
- Frequency: 1470 kHz
- Branding: "The Point"

Programming
- Format: Talk
- Affiliations: ABC News Radio; Fox News Radio; Compass Media Networks; Genesis Communications Network; Salem Radio Network; Townhall News; USA Radio Network; Westwood One

Ownership
- Owner: Glory Communications, Inc. and Capital City Radio
- Sister stations: WFMV, WTQS

History
- First air date: July 15, 1954

Technical information
- Licensing authority: FCC
- Facility ID: 41333
- Class: D
- Power: 11,000 watts day 100 watts night
- Translator: 100.7 W264DF (Columbia)

Links
- Public license information: Public file; LMS
- Webcast: Listen Live
- Website: makethepointradio.com

WQXL (1470 AM "The Point 100.7 FM and 1470 AM") is a commercial radio station in Columbia, South Carolina. The station is owned by Glory Communications and operated by Capital City Media. It airs a talk radio format. Local hosts are heard in morning and afternoon drive times, with nationally syndicated talk shows heard middays, evenings and late nights. They include Dave Ramsey, Dennis Prager, Todd Schnitt, Ben Shapiro, Brian Kilmeade, and Red Eye Radio. Most hours begin with Salem Radio news. Operator Keven Cohen hosts both the 7 AM and 4 PM radio shows, with a local host at 9 AM, and Phil Kornblut, whose long-running statewide sports radio program has been owned and operated by WQXL since January 29, 2019, after its previous syndicator shut down in-state operations, is on at 6 PM.

The transmitter, located off New State Road in Cayce, transmits with 11,000 watts during the day and 100 watts at night. Programming is simulcast on FM translator W264DF 100.7 MHz in the Columbia area.

== History ==
On July 15, 1954, the station signed on as WOIC, owned by Frank A. Michalak. It was a daytimer powered at 1,000 watts. In 1957, it got a boost to 5,000 watts, under new owners Speidel-Fischer Broadcasting, but it still had to sign-off at sunset. At the time, it aired 90 hours of programming each week for the African-American community.

The station became WQXL in 1962 after the station was sold to the Belk Broadcasting Company. The WOIC call sign resurfaced that same year on 1320 AM (now WISW). WQXL originally aired a Big Band format, which eventually gave way to a Top 40 format by the end of the decade. However it was handicapped with a daytime-only signal and was unsuccessful in competing against format rivals 1230 WNOK and 1400 WCOS, which each had full-time signals. Probably its most notable personality was Mackie "Cactus" Quave who had worked at 560 WIS (now WVOC) and had a successful kids TV show on NBC Network affiliate Channel 10 WIS-TV. WQXL switched to country music in the summer of 1966, but again was bested by rival 620 WCAY (now WFMV). In 1973, the station switched to religious programming and eventually adopted a Contemporary Christian format.

WQXL was bought by Metro Communications in 1989. The company shut down the station on August 23, 2006, in preparation to be moved. While the station was off the air, Metro got the Federal Communications Commission to allow an increase in the station's hours of operation to full-time, powered at 138 watts at night. In the meantime, WQXL's former studios and towers that date back to the WOIC era were torn down in early 2007 as the station moved to Springdale, just outside Columbia.

In June 2007, Metro announced WQXL would be sold. The new owner was Glory Communications Inc., owned by Alex Snipe, Jr. of Columbia. Glory already owned 620 WGCV and 95.3 WFMV. WQXL resumed operations on August 10, 2007. Glory Communications received permission from the FCC to boost the station's daytime power to 11,000 watts, with the nighttime power reduced slightly to 100 watts. The station was paired with an FM translator at 95.9 MHz.

On October 19, 2013, popular Columbia radio host Keven Cohen, who had been fired from Clear Channel station 560 WVOC in November 2012, announced that he had leased WQXL and would program it with a talk radio format. In 2016, the translator was switched to 100.7 MHz.

== Translator ==
Broadcast translator for WQXL
Call sign	Frequency	City of license	FID	ERP (W)	HAAT	Class	Transmitter coordinates	FCC info
W264DF	100.7 FM	Columbia, South Carolina	138354	215	0 m (0 ft)	D	34°2′38″N 80°59′51″W	LMS
