= WCCP =

WCCP may refer to:

- WCCP-FM, a radio station (105.5 FM) licensed to Clemson, South Carolina, United States
- WAHT, a radio station (1560 AM) licensed to Clemson, South Carolina, United States, which used the call sign WCCP until June 1988 and from March 1989 to June 1997
- Web Cache Communication Protocol
- Western Canada Concept Party
