= Community Broadcasters =

American radio broadcasting company

Community Broadcasters, LLC is a Watertown, New York-based radio holding group that owns radio stations in its own market and surrounding areas. It was founded by media executives Bruce Mittman and Jim Leven, and started out in 2006 by buying stations owned by Clancy-Mance Communications, Inc.

== Station list ==
All in the state of New York:

Frequency	Callsign	City of License	Market	Format
1240 kHz	WATN	Watertown, New York	Watertown	News/Talk
106.7 MHz	WBDR	Copenhagen, New York	Watertown	Top 40
100.7 MHz	WEFX	Henderson, New York	Watertown	Country
95.3 MHz	WLFK	Gouverneur, New York	Gouverneur	Country
94.1 MHz	WOTT	Calcium, New York	Watertown	Modern Rock
92.7 MHz	WQTK	Ogdensburg, New York	Ogdensburg	News/Talk
1400 kHz	WSLB	Ogdensburg, New York	Ogdensburg	Sports/Talk
103.1 MHz	WTOJ	Carthage, New York	Watertown	Adult Contemporary

In South Carolina:

Frequency	Callsign	City of License
1240 kHz	WDXY	Sumter, South Carolina
95.3 MHz	WFRK	Quinby, South Carolina
105.3 MHz	WGFG	Branchville, South Carolina
1260 kHz	WHYM	Lake City, South Carolina
95.5 MHz	WIBZ	Wedgefield, South Carolina
1230 kHz	WOLH	Florence, South Carolina
95.7 MHz	WQKI-FM	Orangeburg, South Carolina
93.7 MHz	WSIM	Lamar, South Carolina
94.7 MHz	WWBD	Sumter, South Carolina
1290 kHz	WWHM	Sumter, South Carolina
99.3 MHz	WWKT-FM	Kingstree, South Carolina
98.3 MHz	WLJI	Summerton, South Carolina
105.1 MHz	WPDT	Coward, South Carolina
94.5 MHz	WSPX	Bowman, South Carolina
1490 kHz; 97.1 MHz	WTQS; W246BX	Cameron, South Carolina

=== Former stations ===
The Elmira and Olean stations were originally acquired from Backyard Broadcasting after that company mostly exited radio in 2013. They were spun off to Seven Mountains Media in 2019.

Frequency	Callsign	City of License	Market	Format
106.1 MHz	WNKI	Corning, New York	Elmira-Corning	Top 40
104.9 MHz	WNGZ	Montour Falls, New York	Elmira-Corning	Modern Rock
100.9 MHz	WPGI	Horseheads, New York	Elmira-Corning	Country
820 kHz	WWLZ	Horseheads, New York	Elmira-Corning	News/Talk
1490 kHz	WRCE	Watkins Glen, New York	Elmira Corning	Classic Country
1450 kHz	WOLY	Olean, New York	Olean	Classic Hits
95.7 MHz	WPIG	Olean, New York	Olean	Country

The Florida stations were sold to JVC Broadcasting effective February 1, 2021.

Frequency	Callsign	City of License
92.1 MHz	WECQ	Destin, Florida
102.1 MHz	WWAV	Santa Rosa Beach, Florida
98.1 MHz	WHWY	Holt, Florida
103.1 MHz	WZLB	Valparaiso, Florida

Community Broadcasters surrendered the license for WDKD to the Federal Communications Commission on November 16, 2021.

Frequency	Callsign	City of License
1310 kHz	WDKD	Kingstree, South Carolina
