= WSLB =

- Ogdensburg, New York; United States
- Broadcast area: Northern New York
- Frequency: 1400 kHz
- Branding: ESPN 1400 AM

Programming
- Format: Sports
- Affiliations: ESPN Radio

Ownership
- Owner: Community Broadcasters, LLC
- Sister stations: WATN; WBDR; WEFX; WLFK; WOTT; WQTK; WTOJ

History
- First air date: 1940; 86 years ago
- Call sign meaning: Where the Saint Lawrence Broadens

Technical information
- Licensing authority: FCC
- Facility ID: 66663
- Class: C
- Power: 1,000 watts unlimited
- Transmitter coordinates: 44°42′21.2″N 75°27′53.8″W

Links
- Public license information: Public file; LMS
- Webcast: Listen live
- Website: cbogdensburg.com/espn1400/

WSLB (1400 AM) is a sports radio station, operating from Ogdensburg, New York, United States. Prior to switching to a sports format, WSLB was an oldies radio station. WSLB is the affiliate of ESPN Radio for the St. Lawrence County area.

== History ==
WSLB began broadcasting in 1940 as the Mutual Broadcasting System affiliate in Ogdensburg. The station switched to NBC Radio in the early 1990s when it entered into a three-way simulcast with sister stations WIGS (1230) and WGIX-FM (95.3) in Gouverneur with an oldies format as "FSR -- Full-Service Radio". WIGS went off the air permanently in the mid-1990s and the two remaining stations simulcast until WSLB took a conservative talk format as "Talk 1400". In 2006, the station picked up the ESPN Radio affiliation on weekends before going full-time beginning Saturday, December 1, 2007, dropping its talk format. On December 3, 2007, WQTK began running a similar talk format to the one that had once aired on WSLB.
