= WWHM =

- Sumter, South Carolina; United States
- Broadcast area: Sumter, South Carolina; Sumter County, South Carolina
- Frequency: 1290 kHz
- Branding: Jamz 92.3/93.3

Programming
- Format: Classic hip hop

Ownership
- Owner: Community Broadcasters, LLC
- Sister stations: WWBD, WWKT-FM, WDXY, WIBZ

History
- First air date: 1990 (as WQMC)
- Former call signs: WQMC (10/1989-11/1989); WFIG (11/1989-12/1989); WQMC (1989–2007)

Technical information
- Licensing authority: FCC
- Facility ID: 43833
- Class: D
- Power: 1,000 watts day 12 watts night
- Transmitter coordinates: 33°55′16″N 80°16′59″W
- Translators: 92.3 W222BH (Sumter); 93.3 W227BI (Sumter)

Links
- Public license information: Public file; LMS
- Webcast: Listen Live
- Website: WWHM Online

WWHM (1290 AM) is a radio station licensed to serve Sumter, South Carolina. The station is owned by Community Broadcasters, LLC. It airs a classic hip hop format.

== History ==
The station was assigned the WWHM call letters by the Federal Communications Commission on November 21, 2007. WWHM changed its name & format on August 21 of 2025. Its new name is Jamz 92.3/93.3 & its new format is Classic Hiphop. For many years the frequency was WFIG "World Famous Iris Gardens." It was a country format. It's FM sister station in Sumter, was signed on as WFIG-FM, but became WWDM-FM, The Big DM.

== Format and name change ==
On August 31, 2025, WWHM changed their format from urban oldies to classic hip hop, branded as "Jamz 92.3/93.3". The first song played on Jamz was "Bring Em' Out" by T.I.
