= WGCV =

WGCV may refer to:

- WVGC (AM), a radio station (1400 AM) licensed to serve Elberton, North Carolina, United States, which held the call sign WGCV in 2022
- WFMV (AM), a radio station (620 AM) licensed to serve Cayce, South Carolina, United States, which held the call sign WGCV from 2003 to 2019
- WTPS (AM), a radio station (1240 AM) licensed to serve Petersburg, Virginia, United States, which held the call sign WGCV from 1989 to 2003
