= WPCO (South Carolina) =

Radio station in Columbia, South Carolina (1947–2022)

Coordinates: 33°59′34.6″N 81°2′44.3″W

- Columbia, South Carolina; United States
- Broadcast area: Columbia metropolitan area
- Frequency: 1230 kHz
- Branding: 1230AM The Palm

Programming
- Format: Adult album alternative

Ownership
- Owner: Alpha Media; (Alpha Media Licensee LLC)
- Sister stations: WARQ; WHXT; WMFX; WWDM; WSCZ

History
- First air date: January 1, 1947
- Last air date: January 2022
- Former call signs: WNOK (1947–1979); WXAP (1979–1980); WNOK (1980–1988); WODE (1988–1989); WOIC (1989–2018)
- Call sign meaning: "Palm Columbia"

Technical information
- Facility ID: 73370
- Class: C
- Power: 1,000 watts unlimited

Links
- Website: www.949thepalm.com

WPCO (1230 AM, "1230AM The Palm") was a radio station in Columbia, South Carolina. Last owned by Alpha Media, it broadcast an adult album alternative (AAA) format. Its studios were on Pineview Road in Columbia, with a transmitter tower located near Bicentennial Park along the Congaree River in downtown Columbia. It was also heard on FM translator W235CH at 94.9 MHz, using the translator's dial position as its moniker, "94.9 The Palm". (South Carolina is known as the Palmetto State.)

The station went on the air in 1947 as WNOK. After going silent in January 2022, WPCO's license was cancelled and deleted by the FCC on January 5, 2023. The AAA programming, no longer heard on the AM station, continued on the FM translator, 94.9 W235CH, now rebroadcasting co-owned 93.5 WARQ-HD4. The 94.9 translator was transferred to Norsan Media to broadcast WCEO, and is still heard on WARQ-HD4.

== History ==
The station signed on the air on January 1, 1947. Its original call sign was WNOK and it featured programing from the Mutual Broadcasting System. In the early 1950s, WNOK had added a UHF TV station on Channel 67, eventually changing to Channel 19 by the early 1960s. (WNOK-TV was sold by 1977, becoming WLTX.) Also, an FM station on 104.7 was added in 1958, which is where the WNOK call sign resides today.

In the late 1950s and early 1960s, WNOK programmed various music genres known then as "Block Programming". In the end, Top 40 won out and, by the mid-1960s, it was full-time Top 40. However, after making little headway against WCOS, it tried "The Now Sound" in 1967, a mix of MOR and light rock/pop. It also affiliated with CBS during that time. In late 1970, it returned to Top 40 and briefly gave WCOS a good run for its money. In 1980, the station changed to country and disco formats under the call letters of WXAP. Neither format lasted more than six months and the WNOK call letters were reclaimed at the end of the year. The station eventually simulcasted parts of WNOK-FM's Top 40 (now known as CHR) format, although much of the remaining broadcast day was still automated under adult contemporary and CHR formats. By the fall of 1985, the automation was finally done away with and WNOK was simulcasting full-time with the FM.

In the fall of 1987, WNOK dropped the simulcast, becoming an AOR/classic rock hybrid as "Rock 1230". However, FM station WMFX signed on shortly afterwards with a similar format, taking away the station's potential audience. In September 1988, the station became "Oldies 1230" under the WODE call letters featuring an oldies format. Another FM station, WPRH, became WOMG in the spring of 1989 with a similar format, again taking away much of the station's audience.

In the fall of that year, Price Broadcasting, then-owners of longtime urban contemporary outlet WOIC (1320 AM) announced that they were dropping the call letters and format for a simulcast of sister FM, WOMG. In order to prevent any public outcry, arrangements were made with WODE to move the WOIC call letters, format, and staff over to 1230 AM.

WOIC spent much of the 1990s as well as the early 2000s under various urban-flavored formats. In 2003, WOIC became an affiliate of ESPN Radio. This lasted until 2005 when the ESPN programming was moved to sister FM station WZMJ and WOIC was re-launched as an Air America Radio affiliate.

At times, WOIC's ratings had surpassed WISW's, especially during sporting events, because of the performance of teams on WISW, compared to the performance of teams on WOIC (Clemson Tigers (WOIC) versus Gamecocks).

In the 2007 calendar year, teams broadcast on WOIC carried postseason football and basketball coverage; teams broadcast on rival WISW did not, leaving more revenue and higher ratings for these events, which had helped WOIC's ratings against WISW, even though the postseason months are not calculated on Arbitron ratings for the specific days.

Until January 25, 2010, WOIC was in a unique position because of the nationally syndicated liberal shows (Air America) that contrasted with the local population. Even though Columbia, South Carolina is relatively progressive compared to the rest of South Carolina, the state is viewed as the 'reddest state' and generally conservative to paleo-conservative with small enclaves of progressives. WOIC's programming was a mix of liberal (progressive) nationally syndicated Air America shows and locally produced public interest shows. The weekend show lineup was mostly local programming and helped balance the nationally syndicated overall flavor of the station. There were a number of daily center-left local programs that were heard Monday through Friday. WOIC's line-up served the people of Columbia, better than most, because of the amount of local programming and the ability of listeners to be able to interact with the local show hosts. Especially on the weekends, WOIC was 'Friends and Neighbors' radio.

Changes began to the lineup on January 25, 2010, due to the bankruptcy filing of Air America.

The station became owned by Alpha Media through licensee Alpha Media Licensee LLC, which also owns Urban Contemporary WHXT, Urban AC WWDM, Modern rock WMFX, and Hot AC WARQ in the Columbia radio market.

In July 2012, "The Zone", a local afternoon sports show, moved from WZMJ.

On December 27, 2013, it was announced that the ESPN Radio format would return to WOIC on January 1, 2014, and the station would be rebranded as "ESPN Columbia 1230 AM."

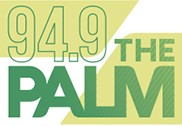
Former logo

On September 30, 2018, WOIC dropped ESPN Radio and began stunting with a loop of Robert Plant's "29 Palms"' as 94.9 The Palm; on October 1, the station switched to adult album alternative under the same name. On October 11, 2018, WOIC changed their call letters to WPCO.

It was reported to the Federal Communications Commission (FCC) that WPCO was silent as of January 10, 2022. The station license was cancelled and deleted by the FCC on January 5, 2023. The AAA programming, no longer heard on the AM station, continued on the FM translator, 94.9 W235CH, rebroadcasting co-owned 93.5 WARQ-HD4.

Norsan Media purchased W235CH with a translator use agreement, with the plan to simulcast WCEO.

== See also ==
- List of radio stations in South Carolina
