= ICBC (disambiguation) =

ICBC may stand for:

- Imperial College Boat Club, in London, England
- Industrial and Commercial Bank of China
- Insurance Corporation of British Columbia, a provincial crown corporation in charge of drivers' licenses and auto insurance
- Inter-Collegiate Business Competition, hosted by Queen's University in Kingston, Ontario, Canada
- Inner City Broadcasting Corporation, a former United States media company
