= Inner City Broadcasting Corporation =

American radio broadcast company

The Inner City Broadcasting Corporation ("ICBC") was an American media company based in New York City. It was one of the first broadcasting companies wholly owned by African Americans.

== History ==
Inner City was founded in 1970 by a group of prominent African-American New Yorkers active in business and civic affairs. They were led by Percy Sutton, an attorney and a former president of the New York borough of Manhattan; and Clarence Jones, a former publisher of the New York Amsterdam News. Sutton and Jones were joined by over fifty shareholders including legendary disk jockey Hal Jackson; Sutton's fellow "Gang of Four" member David Dinkins, who would later become New York's first African-American mayor; Wilbert (Bill) Tatum, who succeeded Jones as publisher of the Amsterdam News; future New York state senator and comptroller Carl McCall; Betty Shabazz, the widow of Black Muslim minister and civil rights leader Malcolm X; civil rights activist, journalist and congressional aide Marcella P. West; and musicians Billy Taylor and Roberta Flack. Dorothy Brunson, who would later become the first African-American woman to wholly own an American radio station, was an executive at the company during its early years.

WLIB, owned by brothers Harry and Morris S. Novik and programmed to New York's black community, was Inner City's first acquisition, in 1972. The sale included a right of first refusal clause to later acquire sister station WLIB-FM, which was renamed WBLS; Inner City exercised the clause two years later. While WLIB continued largely as a talk radio outlet, WBLS's format transitioned from jazz to a progressive mix of black music, under the slogan "The Total Black Experience in Sound." WBLS would experience a period of tremendous success from the mid-1970s to the early 1980s as it pioneered the urban contemporary format under program director Frankie Crocker, and the profile of Inner City rose with it.

Inner City later purchased radio stations in the Los Angeles area; Detroit; San Antonio, Texas (co-founder Percy Sutton's hometown); the San Francisco Bay Area; Philadelphia; Pittsburgh; Fort Wayne, Indiana; Columbia, South Carolina; and Jackson, Mississippi. Inner City also owned a variety of other media assets, including two cable television joint ventures with Time Warner Cable in New York City and Philadelphia.

The company was also given the task of running and reviving the Apollo Theater in New York's Harlem. In this capacity, Inner City Broadcasting was a co-producer of the syndicated television variety series It's Showtime at the Apollo.

== Recent developments ==
In 1990 Percy Sutton retired as chairman of the board of Inner City Broadcasting, though he remained as chairman emeritus until his death in 2009. He was succeeded by his son Pierre Sutton, who served in that capacity until the firm's closure.

In 1999 Inner City lost control of the Apollo Theatre after an investigation by the New York State Attorney General's office (completed by Eliot Spitzer) found that members of the nonprofit Apollo Theatre Foundation, led by Charles Rangel, retained revenues generated by production of It's Showtime at the Apollo. The final decision resulted in Rangel stepping down as chairman of the foundation; he was replaced by actor Ossie Davis. Time Warner took over operational control of the venue as part of the final decision.

In August 2004, ICBC redeemed nearly $140 million accreted value of redeemable preferred stock in a recapitalization led by GE Capital and Alta Communications, a Boston-based private equity firm. By 2006 Inner City had sold or otherwise disposed of the majority of its investments outside of its core radio stations. The last remaining investment, a 60 percent share in Philadelphia-based Urban Cable Works, was sold in November 2005 to Time Warner Cable.

On August 22, 2011, Inner City's creditors petitioned the United States Bankruptcy Court to force the firm's wholly owned subsidiary, Inner City Media Corporation, to declare Chapter 11 bankruptcy on grounds that the company's executives failed to accept a buyout offer. The filing resulted in majority control of Inner City being taken over by YMF Media LLC, controlled jointly by investor Ronald Burkle and former NBA player Earvin "Magic" Johnson. YMF Media eventually purchased 15 Inner City stations for $180 million on October 19, 2012; the firm then broke up the group in a series of subsequent sales during 2013–2014.

== Stations ==
| AM Station | FM Station |

| Market | Station | Years owned | Current status |
|---|---|---|---|
| San Francisco - Oakland - San Jose | KBLX-FM 102.9 | 1979–2012 | Owned by Bonneville International |
| San Francisco - Oakland - San Jose | KVTO 1400 | 1979–2012 | Owned by Pham Radio Communication |
| San Francisco - Oakland - San Jose | KVVN 1430 | 1997–2012 | Owned by Pham Radio Communication |
| Los Angeles | KGFJ 1230 | | KYPA, owned by Woori Media Group |
| Los Angeles | KUTE 101.9 | 1979–1985 | KSCA, owned by Uforia Audio Network |
| Miami - Ft. Lauderdale - Hollywood, FL | WSRF 1580 | | Owned by Niche Radio, Inc. |
| Miami - Ft. Lauderdale - Hollywood, FL | WSHE 103.5 | | WMIB, owned by iHeartMedia |
| Fort Wayne, Indiana | WOWO 1190 | 1994–1995 | Owned by Federated Media |
| Fort Wayne, Indiana | WOWO-FM 102.9 | 1994 | WJCI, owned by Calvary Radio Network |
| Detroit | WLBS 102.7 | 1979–1988 | WDKL, owned by Educational Media Foundation |
| Jackson, Mississippi | WJNT 1180 | 2006–2012 | Owned by Alpha Media |
| Jackson, Mississippi | WJQS 1400 | 2000–2012 | Owned by Alpha Media |
| Jackson, Mississippi | WOAD 1300 | 2000–2012 | Owned by Alpha Media |
| Jackson, Mississippi | WJMI 99.7 | 2000–2012 | Owned by Alpha Media |
| Jackson, Mississippi | WKXI-FM 107.5 | 2000–2012 | Owned by Alpha Media |
| Jackson, Mississippi | WRKS 105.9 | 2000–2012 | Owned by Alpha Media |
| New York City | WLIB 1190 | 1972–2012 | Owned by Emmis Communications |
| New York City | WBLS 107.5 | 1974–2012 | Owned by Mediaco Holding |
| Philadelphia | WHAT 1340 | 2000–2006 | Owned by VM Broadcasting |
| Pittsburgh | WURP 1550 | 2000–2007 | WZUM, owned by Pittsburgh Public Media |
| Columbia, South Carolina | WOIC 1230 | 2000–2012 | Defunct; went silent as WPCO in 2022 |
| Columbia, South Carolina | WARQ 93.5 | 2000–2012 | Owned by Alpha Media |
| Columbia, South Carolina | WHXT 103.9 | 2003–2012 | Owned by Alpha Media |
| Columbia, South Carolina | WMFX 102.3 | 2000–2012 | Owned by Alpha Media |
| Columbia, South Carolina | WWDM 101.3 | 2000–2012 | Owned by Alpha Media |
| Columbia, South Carolina | WZMJ 93.1 | 2003–2012 | Owned by Midlands Media Group |
| San Antonio | KSJL 760 | 1986–1993 | KTKR, owned by iHeartMedia |
| San Antonio | KSLR/KSAQ/KSJL-FM 96.1 | 1986–1998 | KXXM, owned by iHeartMedia |

== See also ==
- Radio One (company)
