= CTSN =

CTSN may refer to:

- Clemson Tigers Sports Network
- Crimson Tide Sports Network
