= WSPX =

WSPX may refer to:

- WSPX (FM), a radio station (94.5 FM) licensed to Bowman, South Carolina, United States
- WSPX-TV, a television station (channel 36, virtual 56) licensed to Syracuse, New York, United States
