= WQTK =

Radio station

- Ogdensburg, New York; United States
- Broadcast area: St. Lawrence County
- Frequency: 92.7 MHz
- Branding: 92.7 WQTK

Programming
- Format: Talk radio
- Affiliations: ABC News Radio; Premiere Networks; Salem Radio Network; Westwood One

Ownership
- Owner: Community Broadcasters, LLC
- Sister stations: WATN, WBDR, WEFX, WLFK, WOTT, WSLB, WTOJ

History
- First air date: June 1, 1981
- Former call signs: WPAC (1981–2003); WBDB (2003–2007)

Technical information
- Licensing authority: FCC
- Facility ID: 66661
- Class: A
- ERP: 3,000 watts
- HAAT: 95 meters (312 ft)
- Transmitter coordinates: 44.706°N 75.465°W

Links
- Public license information: Public file; LMS
- Website: WQTK Online

WQTK (92.7 FM) is a commercial radio station licensed to Ogdensburg, New York, and serving St. Lawrence County. Owned and operated by Community Broadcasters, LLC, WQTK broadcasts a talk radio format, using the slogan "The North Country's News And Talk Authority."

WQTK has an effective radiated power of 3,000 watts. The radio studios and transmitter are on Knox Street near Champlain Street in Ogdensburg.

== Programming ==
WQTK's schedule is largely made up of nationally syndicated conservative talk shows. They include Hugh Hewitt, Glenn Beck, Sean Hannity, Mark Levin, "Coast to Coast AM with George Noory" and "America in the Morning."

Weekends include repeats of weekday shows, some religious programming, as well as "Bill Handel on the Law," "Sunday Nights with Bill Cunningham" and "The Weekend with Joe Pags." Most hours begin with world and national news from CBS Radio News.

The station is an affiliate of the Ottawa Senators Radio Network, and is the only American station affiliated with this network.

== Station history ==
In June 1981, the station signed on the air as WPAC playing Top 40 hits. In 2001, the station changed formats to classic rock, calling itself "Adult Rock PAC 93."

It was owned by The Wireless Works from the time of its 1981 launch until the early 2000s, when it was sold to Clancy-Mance Broadcasting of Watertown, New York. Clancy-Mance changed formats to a Top 40 simulcast of sister station WBDI 106.7 FM in Copenhagen, New York. The two stations were known as "The Border." 92.7 changed its call sign to WBDR.

At 6 a.m. on Monday, December 3, 2007, the station became WQTK. That ushered in an all-talk format on the station, kicking off with "Imus In The Morning", a syndicated talk show from New York City.

On May 22, 2026, WQTK began carrying ABC News Radio immediately after CBS News Radio signed off.
