= WODR =

WODR may refer to:

- WODR-LD, a low-power television station (channel 19) licensed to serve Wausau, Wisconsin, United States
- WGHJ, a radio station (105.3 FM) licensed to serve Fair Bluff, North Carolina, United States, which held the call sign WODR from 2005 to 2015
