= WFOX =

WFOX may refer to:

- WFOX (FM), a radio station (102.3 FM) licensed to St. Andrews, South Carolina, United States
- WFOX-LP, a low-power radio station (104.3 FM) licensed to serve Sandy Springs, South Carolina, United States
- WFOX-TV, a TV station (channel 14, virtual 30) licensed to Jacksonville, Florida, United States
- WICC-FM, a radio station (95.9 FM) licensed to Southport, Connecticut, United States, which used the WFOX call sign from 2006 until 2026
- WSRV, a radio station (97.1 FM) licensed to Gainesville, Georgia, United States, which used the WFOX call sign from 1972 until 2006
