= Warq =

Warq may refer to:

- WARQ, a radio station licensed to Columbia, South Carolina, United States
- Vark, a metallic leaf used on South Asian sweets
