= WSCZ =

Radio station in Winnsboro, South Carolina

Coordinates: 34.363°N 80.911°W

- Winnsboro, South Carolina; United States
- Broadcast area: Columbia metropolitan area
- Frequency: 93.9 MHz
- Branding: Hot 103.9 / 93.9

Programming
- Format: Mainstream urban (WHXT simulcast)
- Affiliations: Premiere Networks

Ownership
- Owner: Connoisseur Media; (Alpha Media Licensee, LLC)
- Sister stations: WHXT, WARQ, WFOX, WWDM

History
- First air date: 1990 (as WQKI-FM)
- Former call signs: WQKI-FM (1991–2003); WIGL (2003–2010)

Technical information
- Licensing authority: FCC
- Facility ID: 54576
- Class: C3
- ERP: 8,900 watts
- HAAT: 166.3 meters (546 ft)

Links
- Public license information: Public file; LMS
- Webcast: Listen Live
- Website: hot1039939.com

WSCZ (93.9 FM) is a commercial radio station licensed to Winnsboro, South Carolina. It is owned by Connoisseur Media and it simulcasts WHXT 103.9 in Orangeburg, South Carolina. Together both stations cover most of the Columbia Metropolitan Area, with WSCZ based to the north and WHXT based to the south. The stations air a mainstream urban radio format. The studios are on Pineview Road in Columbia and WSCZ's transmitter is off Flint Hill Road in Winnsboro.

== Station history ==
WQKI-FM first signed on in 1990 as the FM sister station of WQKI. WQKI-FM featured an urban contemporary music format under the "Quikie 93.9" moniker.

In 2003, Miller Communications acquired WQKI-FM and swapped its call letters with WIGL 102.9. It got a construction permit to upgrade its signal to cover parts of Columbia. In that year, Miller flipped 93.9 to Hot AC as Mix 93.9 with the nationally syndicated program "The Bob and Sheri Show" in the morning. Two years later, WIGL flipped to Classic Hits as Bad Dog 93–9 with Rick & Bubba in the morning. The station shared the same programming with sister WICI-FM 94.7 in Sumter.

On March 30, 2007, after a year that saw little audience growth, WIGL was LMA'ed to Peregon Broadcasting, the operators of WQVA 1170 in Lexington and temporary operator of WHZQ 94.1 in Cross Hill (WHZQ was dropped several weeks after Peregon acquired control of WIGL). Peregon flipped WIGL to Spanish Contemporary as "Radio Ritmo" (Spanish for "rhythm"), making it the first Spanish language FM in the Columbia radio market. Programming included contemporary music and salsa as well as community affairs. The state's Latino population had increased by 45 percent in five years, fourth in the country. Miller Communications' Harold Miller said, "The response has been excellent."

In July 2008, WIGL went dark and the Ritmo format was relegated to the 1170 AM signal. The LMA with Peregon fell through. On Thursday, July 8, 2010, WIGL's call letters were changed to WSCZ-FM. On Friday, July 16, 2010, WSCZ-FM signed on with mainstream rock as "Z 93-9" with the slogan "Everything That Rocks." Then, in November 2010, WSCZ became "Cat Country 93.9", "Columbia's New Station For Today's Country & Your All Time Favorites".

On September 9, 2014, WSCZ began simulcasting WHXT "Hot 103.9". Effective November 30, 2015, Miller Communications sold WSCZ to Alpha Media LLC for $900,000.
