= WBDR =

Coordinates: 43.880°N 75.719°W

- Copenhagen, New York; United States
- Broadcast area: Watertown, New York
- Frequency: 106.7 MHz
- Branding: The Border 106.7

Programming
- Format: CHR–Top 40
- Affiliations: Premiere Networks

Ownership
- Owner: Community Broadcasters, LLC
- Sister stations: WATN, WEFX, WLFK, WOTT, WQTK, WSLB, WTOJ

History
- First air date: 1991; 35 years ago
- Former call signs: WZQC (1991); WWLF-FM (1991–2000); WBDI (2000–2006); WBDR (2006); WBDI (2006–2008)
- Call sign meaning: Border

Technical information
- Licensing authority: FCC
- Facility ID: 43748
- Class: C3
- ERP: 1,800 watts
- HAAT: 363 meters (1,191 ft)

Links
- Public license information: Public file; LMS
- Website: WBDR Online

WBDR (106.7 FM) is a commercial radio station licensed to Copenhagen, New York, and serving the Watertown area of New York State. It has a CHR/Top 40 radio format and is owned by Community Broadcasters, LLC.

Its effective radiated power (ERP) is 1,800 watts. It uses a fairly tall tower, at 363 meters (1,191 ft) in height above average terrain (HAAT).

== History ==
In 1991, the station signed on as WWLF at 106.7 FM; the call sign was changed to WBDI in 2000.

106.7 and 102.7 WBDR were simulcast as "The Border 102-7, 106-7," from 1996 until 2004. In late 2003, WBDI was simulcast on three frequencies: 92.7, 102.7 and 106.7 for a brief period until 102.7 left "The Border" network in 2004, separating from WBDI's format and dropping CHR to switch to a country music format. WBDI then was simulcast on WBDB 92.7 FM, known as ("The Border 92-7, 106-7"), until 2007. Now 106.7 is the only frequency broadcasting WBDR's programming.

On December 3, 2007, 92.7 WBDB changed its call letters to WQTK and flipped to a talk radio format, separating from WBDI's format. On February 26, 2008, WBDI changed its call letters to WBDR (with 102.7 changing call letters to WLYK on the same day).

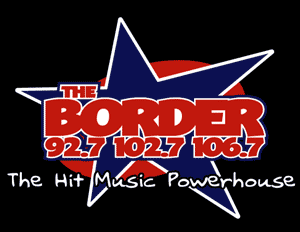
Previous WBDR logo while simulcasting to 92.7 and 102.7

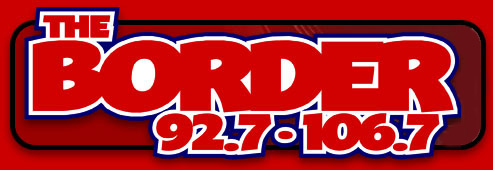
Previous WBDR logo while simulcasting to 92.7
