= WTOJ =

- Carthage, New York; United States
- Broadcast area: Watertown, New York
- Frequency: 103.1 MHz
- Branding: Magic 103.1

Programming
- Format: Adult contemporary
- Affiliations: Compass Media Networks; Premiere Networks

Ownership
- Owner: Community Broadcasters, LLC
- Sister stations: WATN, WBDR, WEFX, WLFK, WOTT, WQTK, WSLB

History
- First air date: November 1, 1984; 41 years ago

Technical information
- Licensing authority: FCC
- Facility ID: 11625
- Class: A
- ERP: 1,800 watts
- HAAT: 181 meters (594 ft)
- Transmitter coordinates: 43.954°N 75.729°W
- Translator: 100.1 W261CP (Lowville)

Links
- Public license information: Public file; LMS
- Webcast: Listen Live
- Website: WTOJ Online

WTOJ (103.1 FM) is an adult contemporary music radio station in Carthage, New York. The station plays music from the 1980s, 1990s, and 2000s. The station is known as "Magic 103.1".

WTOJ also has an FM translator in Lowville W261CP-FM, broadcasting at 100.1 MHz.

== Station history ==
The station first went onto air in 1983. The station has always had an adult contemporary since it signed on.

Magic 103.1's local on-air staff as of 2017 were Ally Payne (mid-days) and Ken Martin (afternoons), with the station programming syndicated programming from John Tesh (mornings) and Delilah (nights). Martin is also the program director for the station and also acts as the production manager for the cluster of stations owned by Community Broadcasters.

Magic 103.1 also carries syndicated programming on the weekend, including American Top 40: The 80s (Saturday 3 PM), Retro Pop Reunion with Joe Cortez (Saturday 7 PM) and American Top 40: The 70's (Sunday 9 AM). Ken Martin had also converted the mono editions of American Top 40 from its first three years to true stereo for Premiere Radio Networks' American Top 40: The 70s.
