= WBDB =

WBDB may refer to:

- WBDB-LP, a defunct low-power radio station (103.3 FM) formerly licensed to serve Richmond, Virginia, United States
- WQTK, a radio station (92.7 FM) licensed to serve Ogdensburg, New York, United States, which held the call sign WBDB from 2003 to 2007
