= WWBD =

- Sumter, South Carolina; United States
- Broadcast area: Florence, Sumter, SC
- Frequency: 94.7 MHz
- Branding: 94.7 The Hog

Programming
- Format: Classic rock

Ownership
- Owner: Community Broadcasters, LLC
- Sister stations: WFRK, WOLH, WPDT, WSIM, WWKT

History
- First air date: 1995 (as WICI)
- Former call signs: WICI-FM (1995); WICI (1995–2009)

Technical information
- Licensing authority: FCC
- Facility ID: 29140
- Class: C3
- ERP: 8,100 watts
- HAAT: 174 meters (571 ft)
- Transmitter coordinates: 34°2′56.00″N 80°12′51.00″W

Links
- Public license information: Public file; LMS
- Webcast: WWBD Webstream
- Website: WWBD Online

WWBD (94.7 FM) is a radio station broadcasting a classic rock music format. Licensed to Sumter, South Carolina, United States, the station is currently owned by Community Broadcasters, LLC.

== History ==
The station was assigned the call letters WICI-FM on January 31, 1995. On February 17, 1995, the station changed its call sign to WICI. On January 21, 2009, the station changed its callsign to the current WWBD.

The "Bad Dog" classic rock format moved from the station that is now WMXZ to WGFG early in 2009. The former WICI also began airing the music, but a few months later added more newer rock.

WWBD was active rock as Rock 94.7 but moved to edgier classic rock from the 70s through the 90s after it fell in the Fall 2018 ratings.
