= WOTT (FM) =

- Calcium, New York; United States
- Broadcast area: Watertown, New York
- Frequency: 94.1 MHz
- Branding: 94 Rock

Programming
- Format: Mainstream rock
- Affiliations: Westwood One; Buffalo Bills Radio Network

Ownership
- Owner: Community Broadcasters, LLC
- Sister stations: WATN; WBDR; WEFX; WLFK; WQTK; WSLB; WTOJ

History
- Former call signs: WZNY (2006–2008); WEFX (2008–2009)
- Call sign meaning: "Watertown"

Technical information
- Licensing authority: FCC
- Facility ID: 166014
- Class: C3
- ERP: 21,500 watts
- HAAT: 108 meters (354 ft)
- Transmitter coordinates: 43°58′0.2″N 75°48′9.7″W

Links
- Public license information: Public file; LMS
- Website: cbwatertown.com/94rock

WOTT (94.1 MHz, "94 Rock") is a commercial radio station licensed to Calcium, New York and serving the Watertown area of New York State. It is owned by Community Broadcasters, LLC, and it airs a mainstream rock radio format.

== History ==
It was originally a country music station, with the call letters WLKC, before taking the current call sign as an oldies station with the on-air name "WOTT (pronounced "watt") Fun Oldies."

After dropping the oldies format and nickname, the station took a classic rock format as "Real Rock 100.7." In early 2007, the station began experimenting with guest DJs and announced that the station would be undergoing some changes. The station rebranded itself as "Rock 100.7".

On February 9, 2009, the station switched frequencies from 100.7 to 94.1 and boosted its power from 6,000 watts to 21,500 watts, allowing the station to reach northern Jefferson county and Lewis county, areas which could never receive the station before. The new class C3 station it moved to was put on the air by Community Broadcasters, LLC after it was purchased from LiveAir Communications, Inc. in January 2009. The station's format and call letters are still the same, but the station's name was changed from Rock 100.7 to Rock 94.

The former 100.7 frequency now belongs to the station WEFX, which at the time was "100.7 The Fox", but is now branded as "100.7 The Eagle".
