= UFO Welcome Center =

Tourist curiosity in South Carolina, United States

Coordinates: 33°21′7″N 80°41′5″W

The UFO Welcome Center was a tourist curiosity located in Bowman, South Carolina, United States, built in the back yard of Jody Pendarvis. It consisted of a 46-foot-wide flying saucer (14 m) built out of wood, fiberglass, and plastic. The structure, entered via a powered ramp, was mounted on four columns, designed to raise and lower with motors. In addition to a labyrinth of mechanical and electronic salvage parts, the saucer was furnished with a bed, satellite television, air conditioning, toilet, and shower. Pendarvis envisioned himself as being an ambassador to aliens and wanted to provide a facility where they could rest after a long journey on UFOs.

Construction on the saucer began in 1994 and it soon became a local tourist attraction. A fee of one dollar was charged for entry. The center was the subject of a 2001 segment in The Daily Show, in which Stephen Colbert presented a caricatured tour of the attraction. In 2003 Pendarvis added a smaller saucer, about 20 feet in width, to the top of the original structure and began living in the saucer during the summers when the saucer is cooler than his nearby mobile home. While previously, in lieu of an admission fee, there was a painted blue wooden tip container, as of 2016 the UFO Welcome Center charges $20 for admission.

On April 22 of 2017, an unidentified intruder broke into the structure and stole a flatscreen TV.

In May of 2018 the UFO Welcome Center began advertising on a billboard on nearby I-26.

In March of 2022, in response to the Russian invasion of Ukraine, the UFO Welcome Center constructed a nonfunctional missile made of scrap metal with the words "To Puttin" [sic] written on the side in white paint.

The UFO Welcome Center burned to the ground at 9am on May 9th, 2024, from a fire of unknown origin. In response to the center's destruction, Pendarvis was quoted as saying "Maybe another UFO came by and set the fire".
