= WQDK =

- Gatesville, North Carolina; United States
- Broadcast area: Northeastern North Carolina; Southside Virginia
- Frequency: 99.3 MHz

Programming
- Format: Christian Radio

Ownership
- Owner: Augusta Radio Fellowship Institute, Inc.

History
- First air date: 1968 (as WRCS-FM)
- Former call signs: WRCS-FM (1968–1981)

Technical information
- Licensing authority: FCC
- Facility ID: 55247
- Class: A
- ERP: 3,700 watts
- HAAT: 128 meters (420 ft)
- Transmitter coordinates: 36°16′29″N 76°43′17″W

Links
- Public license information: Public file; LMS
- Website: gnnradio.org

WQDK (99.3 FM) is a radio station broadcasting a Christian Radio format as an affiliate of Good News Network. Licensed to Gatesville, North Carolina, United States, it serves the Elizabeth City-Nags Head area. The station is owned by Augusta Radio Fellowship Institute, Inc.

Former logo as Q Country 99.3
