= WCEO =

Coordinates: 34°12′42″N 80°50′05″W

WCEO-AM
- Columbia, South Carolina; United States
- Broadcast area: South Carolina
- Frequency: 840 kHz
- Branding: La Raza 840AM Y 94.9FM

Programming
- Format: Regional Mexican
- Affiliations: Charlotte FC

Ownership
- Owner: Norsan Media WCEO, LLC

History
- First air date: January 1, 1994
- Former call signs: WCTG (1988–2000); WCEO (2000–2004); WSCQ (2004)

Technical information
- Licensing authority: FCC
- Facility ID: 54466
- Class: D
- Power: 50,000 watts day
- Translator: 94.9 W235CH (St. Matthew's)

Links
- Public license information: Public file; LMS
- Webcast: Listen Live
- Website: WCEO Online

WCEO (840 AM, "La Raza 840AM Y 94.9FM") is a Regional Mexican radio station located in Columbia, South Carolina, United States. The station is licensed by the Federal Communications Commission (FCC) to broadcast during daytime hours only (sunrise to sunset) with a power of 50,000 watts.

== History ==
840 AM originally signed on January 1, 1994, as WCTG with a Christian/Talk format using programming from USA Radio Network. The format had failed to make a splash in the ratings and was adjusted to a secular Talk format. The station became WCEO in November 2000, but the Talk format continued. Eventually, Spanish-language programming was added on weekends under time broker agreements.

In late November 2004, WCEO briefly changed format to Adult Standards as "Sunny 840", acquiring the callsign WSCQ in the process (WSCQ was used on 100.1 in the Columbia market for many years before becoming WXBT in early 2004). However, this arrangement lasted less than a month before the station changed again to Spanish Contemporary as "La Tremenda", reclaiming the WCEO call letters in the process.

WCEO must leave the air from sunset to sunrise to protect clear-channel WHAS in Louisville, Kentucky.

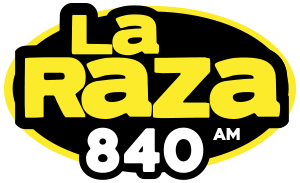
Previous logo

The station is owned by Norsan Media WCEO, LLC.

Norsan Media purchased W235CH, which previously simulcast WPCO, with a translator use agreement, with the plan to simulcast WCEO.
