= WZMJ =

Coordinates: 33.901°N 81.407°W

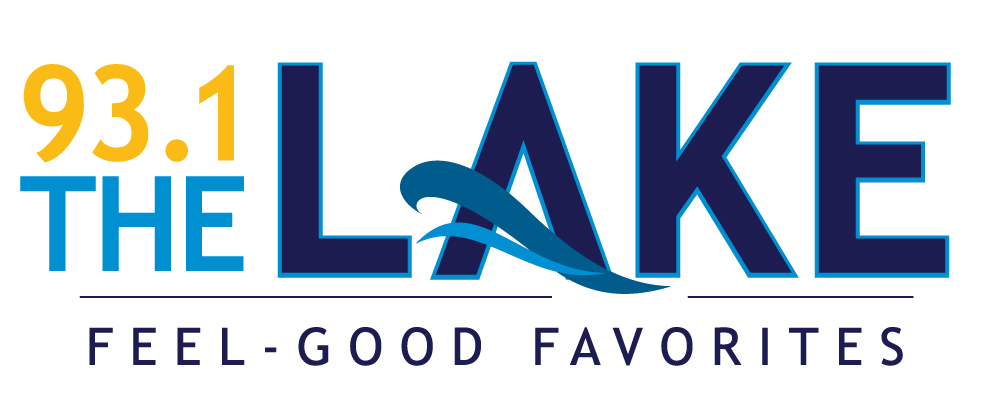
- Batesburg, South Carolina; United States
- Broadcast area: Columbia metropolitan area
- Frequency: 93.1 MHz
- Branding: 93.1 The Lake

Programming
- Format: Classic hits

Ownership
- Owner: Midlands Media Group, LLC
- Sister stations: WUDE

History
- First air date: August 5, 1965
- Former call signs: WBLR-FM (1965–1979); WKWQ-FM (1979–1985); WBLR-FM (1985–1986); WKWQ (1986–1999)
- Former frequencies: 92.1 MHz (1965–1979); 95.3 MHz (1979–1991)
- Call sign meaning: W Z MaJic (the station's previous moniker)

Technical information
- Licensing authority: FCC
- Facility ID: 12421
- Class: A
- ERP: 2,100 watts
- HAAT: 171 meters (561 ft)

Links
- Public license information: Public file; LMS
- Webcast: Listen live
- Website: 931thelakefm.com

WZMJ (93.1 MHz) is a commercial FM radio station licensed to Batesburg, South Carolina, and serving the Columbia metropolitan area. It broadcasts a classic hits radio format and is owned by the Midlands Media Group, LLC. WZMJ calls itself "93.1 The Lake" and features soft to mid-tempo hits of the 1970s, 80s and 90s. The radio studios and offices are on Main Street in Columbia.

WZMJ has an effective radiated power (ERP) of 2,100 watts. The transmitter is on Perry Taylor Road off Two Notch Road in Gilbert, South Carolina.

== History ==
=== WBLR-FM and WKWQ-FM ===
On August 5, 1965, the station signed on the air as WBLR-FM, the sister station to WBLR 1430 AM. At the time, WBLR-FM was located on 92.1 FM. The two stations simulcast a middle of the road (MOR) format of adult music with local news and information.

In 1979, in order to accommodate a class/power increase for WTWE—Manning, WWBD—Bamberg was moved from 92.7 to 92.1, which required WBLR-FM to move from 92.1 to 95.3. WBLR-FM switched its call sign to WKWQ-FM when it moved, playing country music.

It flipped to album rock as "K-95 Rock" in 1986 and started to target nearby Columbia. In 1988, the station changed again to urban contemporary as "Hot 95" in an attempt to compete with urban powerhouse 101.3 WWDM. But WWDM was more powerful and Hot 95 failed to attract many listeners. During this period, the broadcasting tower was moved closer to Columbia.

=== Move to 93.1 ===
WKWQ moved its frequency from 95.3 to 93.1 in early 1991. The station was re-launched as K-93, but was handicapped by underfunded ownership. The station eventually went to satellite programming using Satellite Music Network's "The Touch" Adult Urban Contemporary format and was paired with sister station 103.9 WKSO (now known as WHXT) located in Orangeburg.

This arrangement lasted until 1999 when WKWQ broke off from the simulcast with WKSO and flipped to Urban Oldies as "Majik 93.1." It switched its call letters to WZMJ to echo the "Majik" moniker. Unfortunately, Majic 93.1 never took off due to strong competition from Jammin' Oldies outlet WSCQ (now known as WXBT), which launched a few months later. In 2000, the format was changed to Beach Music.

WZMJ and co-owned urban contemporary outlet WHXT were sold in 2003 to Inner City Broadcasting, a large black-owned company with stations in several large and medium sized markets, primarily broadcasting to the local African-American community. Inner City already owned the market's #1 urban station, 101.3 WWDM.

=== 93.1 The Hound ===
Shortly after the sale, the station changed format to Young Country as "93.1 The Hound." It was unusual for Inner City to own a country station. But 93.1 The Hound was designed as a flanker to help sister station WWDM stay #1, ahead of Clear Channel Communications's country outlet WCOS-FM. Never the less, 93.1 The Hound managed to gain a small audience.

However, in 2005, after the sign-on of Double O Radio's New Country outlet WWNU, sister AM's WOIC ESPN Radio format moved to WZMJ, while WOIC was re-launched as an Air America Radio progressive talk outlet.

=== The Lake ===
On July 27, 2012, Lake Murray Communications, LLC took ownership of the station from bankrupted ICBC Broadcast Holdings and changed it to its current format, branded as "Z93 The Lake". The music format was created by Mike Willis, a 40-year radio veteran, station owner & President/CEO of Lake Murray Communications, LLC. According to Willis, "The format is a product of my early broadcasting and radio station influences, such as WBBQ Augusta, Georgia; WKZQ Myrtle Beach; WLS Chicago; WABC & WNBC NYC; WLAC Nashville; and WOWO Ft. Wayne, Indiana."

93.1 WZMJ airs local high school football and basketball from schools around Lexington County and Lake Murray.

Effective November 1, 2018, Midlands Media Group acquired WZMJ from Lake Murray Communications for $450,000. The station later modified its moniker to "93.1 The Lake."
