= WLGP =

- Harkers Island, North Carolina; United States
- Broadcast area: Greenville-New Bern
- Frequency: 100.3 MHz

Programming
- Format: Christian Radio
- Affiliations: Good News Network

Ownership
- Owner: Augusta Radio Fellowship Institute, Inc.

Technical information
- Licensing authority: FCC
- Facility ID: 27623
- Class: C1
- ERP: 100,000 watts
- HAAT: 148 meters
- Transmitter coordinates: 34°48′17″N 76°54′23″W

Links
- Public license information: Public file; LMS
- Website: gnnradio.org

WLGP (100.3 FM) is a radio station broadcasting a Christian Radio format as an affiliate of Good News Network. Licensed to Harkers Island, North Carolina, United States, it serves the Greenville-New Bern area. The station is currently owned by Augusta Radio Fellowship Institute, Inc.

Programs heard on WLGP include; Grace to You with John MacArthur, In Touch with Charles Stanley, Thru the Bible with J. Vernon McGee, Lester Roloff, Love Worth Finding with Adrian Rogers, Turning Point with David Jeremiah, Back to the Bible with Woodrow Kroll, Family Life Today with Dennis Rainey and Bob Lepine, Running to Win with Erwin Lutzer, Focus on the Family, and Unshackled!.
