= WGFG =

- Branchville, South Carolina; United States
- Broadcast area: Orangeburg, South Carolina; Bowman, South Carolina
- Frequency: 105.3 MHz
- Branding: 105.3 The Cat

Programming
- Format: Country

Ownership
- Owner: Community Broadcasters, LLC
- Sister stations: WQKI-FM, WSPX

Technical information
- Licensing authority: FCC
- Facility ID: 6485
- Class: C3
- ERP: 12,500 watts
- HAAT: 141.1 meters (463 ft)
- Transmitter coordinates: 33°26′35″N 80°48′16″W

Links
- Public license information: Public file; LMS
- Webcast: Listen Live
- Website: WGFG Online

WGFG (105.3 FM), known on-air as "105.3 The Cat", is a country music radio station licensed to Branchville, South Carolina, United States. The station is currently owned by Community Broadcasters, LLC.

Bad Dog is also the home of Bamberg-Ehrhardt High School football and Clemson Tigers football. Some of the artists that can be found on The Bad Dog are Led Zeppelin, Pink Floyd, Lynyrd Skynyrd, Styx, and lesser-known classic rock artists like the Ozark Mountain Daredevils, Little Feat and Average White Band. It was Orangeburg's home for John Boy and Billy every weekday morning until the move over to 105.1. Award-winning radio personality and producer Russ T. Fender co-hosts the morning show with Hailey.

== History ==
Prior to the move of Bad Dog to 105.1, the station carried an Adult Contemporary format as Star 105.1.

The "Bad Dog" format moved to 105.1 MHz and began simulcasting with its former exclusive home at 95.7 on January 14, 2009, as the 95.7 frequency WWBD was sold to Apex Broadcasting. The WWBD letters moved to the former WICI in Sumter, which was also called "Bad Dog".

In 2009, WGFG moved to 105.3 FM.

Logo under previous branding

On July 1, 2011 WGFG changed their format to country, branded as "Cat Country 105.3".

On November 16, 2015 WGFG slightly rebranded as "105.3 The Cat".
