= WZIQ =

Radio station in Smithville-Albany, Georgia

- Smithville, Georgia; United States
- Frequency: 106.5 MHz
- Branding: GNN Radio

Programming
- Format: Christian
- Affiliations: Good News Network

Ownership
- Owner: Augusta Radio Fellowship Institute, Inc.

History
- First air date: May 17, 1992
- Former call signs: WXAA (1992–1993)

Technical information
- Licensing authority: FCC
- Facility ID: 29130
- Class: A
- ERP: 2,450 watts
- HAAT: 157 meters (515 ft)
- Transmitter coordinates: 31°47′59.00″N 84°14′54.00″W

Links
- Public license information: Public file; LMS
- Website: gnnradio.org

WZIQ (106.5 FM) is a Christian radio station licensed to serve Smithville, Georgia, United States. The station is owned by Augusta Radio Fellowship Institute, Inc.

It airs a contemporary Christian format and is an affiliate of the "Good News Network".

The station was assigned the call WXAA letters by the Federal Communications Commission on May 17, 1992. On May 15, 1993, the station changed its call sign to the current WZIQ.

Former logo
