= WGHJ =

- Fair Bluff, North Carolina; United States
- Broadcast area: Whiteville, North Carolina, Wilmington, North Carolina, and Myrtle Beach, South Carolina Elizabethtown, North Carolina
- Frequency: 105.3 MHz
- Branding: Good News Network

Programming
- Format: Christian radio
- Affiliations: Good News Network

Ownership
- Owner: Augusta Radio Fellowship Institute

History
- First air date: 2003 (as WSIM)
- Former call signs: WSIM (2000–2003); WPPG (2003–2004); WNFI (2004–2005); WODR (2005–2015)

Technical information
- Licensing authority: FCC
- Facility ID: 78329
- Class: C3
- ERP: 25,000 watts
- HAAT: 150 meters
- Transmitter coordinates: 34°17′1.00″N 78°48′9.00″W

Links
- Public license information: Public file; LMS
- Webcast: Listen Live
- Website: gnnradio.org

WGHJ (105.3 FM) is a radio station broadcasting a Christian radio format. Licensed to Fair Bluff, North Carolina, United States, and serving the Whiteville, North Carolina area, the station is owned by Augusta Radio Fellowship Institute.

== History ==
The station went on the air as WSIM on May 2, 2000. On June 18, 2003, the station changed its call sign to WPPG, then to WNFI on September 7, 2004, on March 22, 2005 to WODR, and on December 15, 2015 to the current WGHJ. In June 2003, WPPG began airing a Triple-A format. The Penguin, also heard on 106.7 FM starting in August, was "a different kind of bird" that played "the music you've been waiting for." Program director Mark Keefe came from WNCW. Later, this station played oldies. As Radio Fiesta, the station's format was Regional Mexican, with its programming also heard on WOLH and WHYM in Florence, South Carolina and WFMO, which is licensed to Fairmont, North Carolina.

In 2008, WODR owner The Padner Group planned studios in Whiteville, North Carolina and a new beach music format called "Cool 105.3," along with a signal increase to 11 kilowatts. James E. Reddish, known to listeners of WIXE in Monroe, North Carolina as James Edward "Foxx", became general manager. The change took effect September 29, with Foxx as morning host.

In addition to beach music, Cool 105.3 broadcast the Bladen Sports Network, with East Bladen and West Bladen High School high school football, and the Elizabethtown-White Lake Area Chamber of Commerce's Summer Sounds Concert Series.

Effective December 15, 2015, WODR was sold to Augusta Radio Fellowship Institute and switched to Good News Network's Christian radio format, changing its callsign to WGHJ.
