= WZSN =

Radio station in Greenwood, South Carolina

- Greenwood, South Carolina; United States
- Broadcast area: Lakelands
- Frequency: 103.5 MHz
- Branding: GNN Radio

Programming
- Format: Christian radio
- Affiliations: GNN Radio

Ownership
- Owner: Augusta Radio Fellowship Institute, Inc.

History
- First air date: March 3, 1989 (as WMTY-FM)
- Former call signs: WMTY-FM (1989–1999)

Technical information
- Licensing authority: FCC
- Facility ID: 68852
- Class: C3
- ERP: 25,000 watts
- HAAT: 100 meters (330 ft)
- Transmitter coordinates: 34°9′46″N 82°11′41″W

Links
- Public license information: Public file; LMS
- Webcast: https://radio.securenetsystems.net/v5/WLPE
- Website: gnnradio.org

WZSN is a Christian radio station located in Greenwood, South Carolina. The station is licensed by the Federal Communications Commission (FCC) to broadcast on 103.5 FM with an ERP of 25 kW. The station is an affiliate of GNN Radio and is owned and operated by Augusta Radio Fellowship Institute, Inc.

== History ==
The station went on the air as WMTY-FM on March 9, 1989. On January 20, 1991, the station changed its call sign to the current WZSN.

Prior to being acquired by Augusta Radio Fellowship Institute, Inc. in January 2024, and becoming an affiliate of its GNN Radio in May 2024, WZSN was an adult contemporary station for many years known as "Sunny 103.5". The station carried ABC Radio's Hits & Favorites satellite format.

The station was founded by Wally Mullinax who was a popular DJ on country-music WESC-AM "660 in Dixie" in Greenville, SC from 1963 to 1975.
