= WSIM =

- Lamar, South Carolina; United States
- Broadcast area: Florence, South Carolina
- Frequency: 93.7 MHz (HD Radio)
- Branding: Frank 93.7

Programming
- Format: Adult hits
- Subchannels: HD2: Jamz 107.5 (Classic hip hop); HD3: Star 97.1 (Hot adult contemporary)
- Affiliations: Westwood One

Ownership
- Owner: Community Broadcasters, LLC
- Sister stations: WFRK

History
- First air date: October 1992 (as WKHT)
- Former call signs: WXMA (1990–1992); WKHT (1992–2003)

Technical information
- Licensing authority: FCC
- Facility ID: 55269
- Class: A
- ERP: 2,800 watts
- HAAT: 147.9 meters (485 ft)
- Transmitter coordinates: 34°12′12.00″N 79°51′52.00″W
- Translator: (see below)

Links
- Public license information: Public file; LMS
- Webcast: Listen live HD3: Listen live
- Website: Frank 93.7; HD2: Jamz 107.5; HD3: Star 97.1

WSIM (93.7 FM) is a radio station broadcasting an adult hits format. Licensed to Lamar, South Carolina, United States, the station serves the Florence area. The station is currently owned by Community Broadcasters, LLC and features programming from Westwood One . The programming was also simulcast on the now-defunct WDKD.

== Translators ==
In addition to the main station, WSIM has been relayed by a translator to widen its broadcast area. W246AW was "97.1 Frank FM", while W255BD has been a translator for WOLH.

Broadcast translator for WSIM-HD2
Call sign	Frequency	City of license	FID	ERP (W)	Class	FCC info
W298BI	107.5 FM	Florence, South Carolina	142034	160	D	LMS

Broadcast translator for WSIM-HD3
Call sign	Frequency	City of license	FID	ERP (W)	Class	FCC info
W246AW	97.1 FM	Florence, South Carolina	138949	250	D	LMS

== History ==
This station played oldies for several years with the slogan "Good Time Rock and Roll".

Previous logo

More recently, it was adult contemporary. In September 2012, WSIM changed to hot adult contemporary.

On April 5, 2022, WSIM and its HD2 subchannel swapped its adult CHR "Star" and variety "Frank" formats.

On May 27, 2022, W298BI launched a classic hip hop format branded as "Jamz 107.5" on its HD-2 subchannel, with Star moving to HD-3.
