= WHYM =

Former simulcast of WFRK
- Lake City, South Carolina; United States
- Frequency: 1260 kHz
- Branding: Live 95

Programming
- Format: News/talk
- Affiliations: Fox News Radio; Premiere Networks; Westwood One

Ownership
- Owner: Community Broadcasters, LLC

History
- First air date: October 9, 1953 (as WJOT)
- Last air date: December 2025
- Former call signs: WJOT (1953–1991); WVLC (1991–1992); WRIP (1992–1996)
- Call sign meaning: Former slogan as an acronym; "We have your music", or the word hymn

Technical information
- Licensing authority: FCC
- Facility ID: 24149
- Class: D
- Power: 5,000 watts day; 55 watts night
- Transmitter coordinates: 33°51′42.6″N 79°44′14.2″W

Links
- Public license information: Public file; LMS
- Webcast: Listen live
- Website: cbpeedee.com/wfrk953/

WHYM (1260 AM) was a class D radio station licensed to serve Lake City, South Carolina. The station was owned by Community Broadcasters, LLC. The station simulcast WFRK, a news/talk station known as "Live 95".

== Programming ==
Syndicated talk shows hosted on WHYM included Glenn Beck, Dennis Miller, Fred Thompson, and Alan Colmes. Sports coverage included Fox Sports Radio, the weekday morning Press Box with Allen Smothers and University of South Carolina sports. Fox News Radio aired each hour.

== History ==
The station signed on in 1953 as WJOT and aired a variety of local programming.

Then the station shared some of its programming with adult standards radio station WOLS (later WTIX, now WOLH) in Florence, South Carolina. The slogan used by this station was "We Have Your Music".

At one point WHYM was Christian radio.

GHB Broadcasting sold WTIX and WHYM to Estuardo Rodriguez in 2006. WHYM then aired a Regional Mexican music format called Radio Fiesta along with what was once again WOLS.

Miller Communications, Inc. bought WOLH and WHYM in 2008. The switch to an urban oldies format was made in 2009.

On March 1, 2013, WHYM changed its format to sports, with programming from ESPN Radio. WHYM simulcasted WOLH in Florence, also heard on W255BD in Darlington.

Miller Communications sold WHYM, 11 other South Carolina radio stations, and several translators to Community Broadcasters, LLC for $2.5 million, in a transaction that was consummated on January 7, 2016.

WHYM was closed down in December 2025; by then, it was a simulcast of conservative talk station WFRK. The Federal Communications Commission cancelled the station's license on February 4, 2026.
