= WCCP-FM =

- Clemson, South Carolina; United States
- Broadcast area: Upstate South Carolina
- Frequency: 105.5 MHz
- Branding: 105.5 The Roar

Programming
- Format: Sports
- Affiliations: Clemson Tigers Sports Network (flagship station); Atlanta Braves Radio Network; Atlanta Falcons Radio Network; Infinity Sports Network

Ownership
- Owner: John Byrne; (Byrne Acquisition Group, LLC)
- Sister stations: WAHT

History
- First air date: April 8, 1993 (at 104.9)
- Former frequencies: 104.9 MHz (1993–2014)

Technical information
- Licensing authority: FCC
- Facility ID: 24481
- Class: C3
- ERP: 20,000 watts
- HAAT: 114 meters (374 ft)
- Transmitter coordinates: 34°38′13.10″N 82°42′29.70″W

Links
- Public license information: Public file; LMS
- Webcast: Listen Live
- Website: theroarfm.com

WCCP-FM (105.5 MHz) is a commercial radio station in Clemson, South Carolina. It is owned by the Byrne Acquisition Group, headed by John Byrne, and it broadcasts a sports format known as "The Roar". Weekdays it has a line up of local sports hosts. Nights and weekends, it carries CBS Sports Radio. Programming is simulcast on WAHT 1560 AM in Cowpens, South Carolina, and on its FM translator at 97.5 MHz.

WCCP-FM has an effective radiated power (ERP) of 20,000 watts. The transmitter is off Harper Road in Pendleton, South Carolina.

== Station history ==
WCCP-FM signed on the air on April 8, 1993 at 104.9 MHz. It was an oldies station using the name "Foothills 104.9", but switched to all-sports by the end of the decade. Tommy Powell was mainly responsible for getting WCCP-FM 104.9 on the air. Since 2003, WCCP-FM has been the flagship radio station for Clemson University athletics. It also carries Atlanta Falcons football and Atlanta Braves baseball games.

On May 5, 2014, WCCP-FM moved from 104.9 FM to 105.5 FM and rebranded as "105.5 The Roar".

== See also ==
- WAHT
