= GNN Radio =

Christian radio network in the Southeastern United States

Good News Network
- Type: Radio network
- Country: United States
- Branding: GNN Radio

Ownership
- Owner: Augusta Radio Fellowship Institute, Inc.

Links
- Webcast: Listen Live
- Website: www.gnnradio.org

GNNradio (Good News Network) is a network of Christian radio stations in the Southeastern United States, broadcasting Christian talk and teaching programs as well as Christian music.

Programs heard on Good News Network include Grace to You with John MacArthur, In Touch with Charles Stanley, Thru the Bible with J. Vernon McGee, Turning Point with David Jeremiah, Running to Win with Erwin Lutzer, Focus on the Family, and Unshackled!

== Stations ==
The Good News Network is heard on 24 full-powered stations in Georgia, Alabama, South Carolina, and North Carolina; as well as 3 translators.

=== Full-powered stations ===
Call sign	Frequency	City of license	FID	ERP (W)	Class	FCC info
WLPE	91.7 FM	Augusta, Georgia	3236	1,150	A	LMS
WLPT	88.3 FM	Jesup, Georgia	23953	20,000	C1	LMS
WGPH	91.5 FM	Vidalia, Georgia	23950	31,000	C2	LMS
WPWB	90.5 FM	Byron, Georgia	3229	16,500	C2	LMS
WLPG	91.7 FM	Florence, South Carolina	9083	20,000	C2	LMS
WLPF	98.5 FM	Ocilla, Georgia	11646	2,300	A	LMS
WLGP	100.3 FM	Harkers Island, North Carolina	27623	100,000	C1	LMS
WZIQ	106.5 FM	Smithville, Georgia	29130	2,450	A	LMS
WWGF	107.5 FM	Donalsonville, Georgia	78706	6,000	A	LMS
WPMA	102.7 FM	Buckhead, Morgan County, Georgia	740462	7,500	C3	LMS
WTHP	94.3 FM	Gibson, Georgia	83423	6,300	C3	LMS
WSJA	91.3 FM	York, Alabama	173427	5,000	A	LMS
WHBJ	99.1 FM	Barnwell, South Carolina	184539	25,000	C3	LMS
WGHJ	105.3 FM	Fair Bluff, North Carolina	78329	11,000	C3	LMS
WNNG-FM	99.9 FM	Unadilla, Georgia	15309	6,000	A	LMS
WFAL	105.9 FM	Milner, Georgia	190444	4,900	A	LMS
WJTB-FM	95.3 FM	Columbia, South Carolina	24376	6,000	A	LMS
WJNA-FM	96.7 FM	Westminster, South Carolina	84470	22,500	C3	LMS
WMJB-FM	95.3 FM	Valley, Alabama	52040	25,000	C3	LMS
WZTR	104.3 FM	Dahlonega, Georgia	34319	3,700	A	LMS
WQDK	99.3 FM	Gatesville, North Carolina	741733	3,700	A	LMS
WJSG	104.3 FM	Hamlet, North Carolina	29672	6,000	C3	LMS
WBHC-FM	92.1 FM	Hampton, South Carolina	25915	6,000	A	LMS
WZSN	103.5 FM	Greenwood, South Carolina	68852	25,000	C3	LMS

=== Translators ===
Call sign	Frequency	City of license	FID	ERP (W)	Class	FCC info
W236CC	95.1 FM	Richmond Hill, Georgia	139936	38	D	LMS
W244AY	96.7 FM	Myrtle Beach, South Carolina	3238	27	D	LMS
W252BD	98.3 FM	Blakely, Georgia	138268	27	D	LMS

== The Good News Network in Spanish ==
The Good News network also operates three full-powered Spanish language Christian stations, as well as three low-powered translators.

Call sign	Frequency	City of license	FID	ERP (W)	Class	FCC info
WBLR	(1430 AM) FM	Batesburg, South Carolina	17764	5,000 day 163 night	D	LMS
W277DC	103.3 FM	Batesburg, South Carolina	138324	250	D	LMS
WKTM	106.1 FM	Soperton, Georgia	70118	6,000	A	LMS
W268AS	101.5 FM	North Augusta, South Carolina	138261	10	D	LMS
WJDS	88.7 FM	Sparta, Georgia	92979	2,000	A	LMS
W298AS	107.5 FM	Lake Oconee, Georgia	138353	10	D	LMS
