= WARQ =

Radio station in Columbia, South Carolina

- Columbia, South Carolina; United States
- Broadcast area: Columbia metropolitan area
- Frequency: 93.5 MHz (HD Radio)
- Branding: 93.5 The Bubble

Programming
- Format: Hot adult contemporary
- Subchannels: HD2: ALT 99.7 (Alternative rock); HD3: Worship & Word Network (Christian radio); HD4: The Palm (Adult album alternative)

Ownership
- Owner: Connoisseur Media; (Alpha Media Licensee, LLC)
- Sister stations: WHXT, WFOX, WWDM, WSCZ

History
- First air date: February 6, 1971; 55 years ago
- Call sign meaning: 'We Are Q 93.5 (previous branding)

Technical information
- Licensing authority: FCC
- Facility ID: 58400
- Class: A
- ERP: 2,800 watts
- HAAT: 135 meters (443 ft)
- Transmitter coordinates: 34.001°N 81.035°W
- Translators: HD2: 99.7 W259CL (Columbia); HD3: 105.1 W286CT (Columbia)

Links
- Public license information: Public file; LMS
- Webcast: Listen Live; Listen Live (HD2); Listen Live (HD3); Listen Live (HD4)
- Website: 935thebubble.com alt997.com (HD2) worshipandwordnetwork.com (HD3); 949thepalm.com (HD4)

WARQ (93.5 FM) is a commercial radio station in Columbia, South Carolina. It is owned by Connoisseur Media and its studios are on Pineview Road in Columbia, off U.S. Route 378.

WARQ is licensed by the Federal Communications Commission (FCC) to broadcast with an effective radiated power (ERP) of 2,800 watts. The transmitter tower is atop the Capitol Center building at 1201 Main Street. WARQ broadcasts using HD Radio (hybrid) technology. Its HD digital subchannels carry three formats: alternative rock as ALT 99.7, Christian radio from the Worship & Word Network, and adult album alternative as “The Palm”.

== History ==
=== Easy listening ===
The station signed on the air on February 6, 1971. Its original call sign was WXRY. It broadcast in mono with an automated beautiful music format. Later, the station converted to FM stereo, still with an easy listening music format supplied on reel to reel tape by Schulke. The station played quarter hour sweeps of mostly soft instrumental cover versions of adult hits, along with Broadway and Hollywood show tunes.

In 1983, the station adopted the call letters WCEZ, standing for Columbia and EZ listening music. It used the slogans "The Beautiful Place to Be" and "Easy 93 WCEZ."

=== Soft AC ===
Shortly after the sale of WCEZ and sister station WVOC 560 AM to Ridgley Communications, WCEZ abandoned the Easy Listening format, shifting to soft adult contemporary music. It incorporated more vocals and eliminated all but a few instrumentals. WCEZ adopted the moniker "Lite 93.5" and began carrying a satellite-delivered music service supplied by Westwood One known as "Format 41."

Ridgley Communications later filed for bankruptcy protection. A private ownership group, in the fall of 1989, purchased WCEZ and WVOC out of bankruptcy. The group of owners, which included Olympia Networks' Steve Bunyard and broadcast veteran Rick Dames, organized and operated the stations under the Clayton Radio name.

=== Gold-based AC ===
In January 1990, Clayton Radio replaced Format 41 with a Gold-based "WARM" adult contemporary format developed by McVay Media. The station adopted the moniker "Star 93.5" and the call letters WAAS. The call letters were designed to put the station at the top of the Arbitron rating service list of stations and stood for "We Are Always Shining." The jingles used by WAAS were customized versions of JAM's "Q-Cuts" package.

By 1992, WAAS was at a crossroads. The station was experiencing financial difficulties as well as a ratings battle with two other ACs in the market, WTCB and WSCQ (now known as WXBT).

=== Active rock ===
That August, the station, in a rather bold move, flipped to active rock under the "Rock 93.5" handle. Most songs were from the 1990s, but the playlist included a few harder-edged classic rock titles as well. The new call letters became WARQ and the station set out to battle established album rock and classic rock hybrid WFOX for the Columbia rock audience.

In early 1995, WARQ was sold to new owners and the studios were moved with new sister station WWDM. When the move was completed, a brief stunt was done on April Fools' Day when WARQ dropped Album Rock for Hip hop as "93 Jamz" for about an hour. After the stunting was done, "Rock 93.5" was relaunched with a new on-air slogan "Real Rock". At that point, the station segued toward a mix of active rock and alternative rock as a hybrid.

=== Alternative rock ===
WARQ become a full time alternative rock station by early 1996. It dropped the "Real Rock" slogan in the process, switching to "Columbia's Rock Alternative".

In 1999, a new handle known as "Channel 93.5" was adopted by Clear Channel Communications, the stations latest owner. This lasted until 2004, when the "Rock 93.5" moniker was reclaimed after Inner City Broadcasting bought WARQ and its sister stations.

From 2000 to 2003, WARQ hosted the Fallout concerts at Finlay Park, featuring popular bands of the time including Incubus and Our Lady Peace. WARQ hosted Fallout again from 2009 to 2012 outside of Jillian's bar in the Vista, and hosted Springout from 2010-'13 there also. Their lineup for Fallout '09 was Atlanta's Collective Soul (for their Collective Soul album, Atlanta's Cartel, and Charleston's Deepfield. In 2010, Fallout had Tennessee's Fuel, Jacksonville's Red Jumpsuit Apparatus, and Athens' Dead Confederate. In 2011, Fallout had Canada's Theory of a Deadman and Michigan's Pop Evil. In 2012, Fallout had Mississippi's Saving Abel, Charlotte's Paper Tongues, and Columbia's Weaving the Fate (Villanova). In 2010, WARQ's Springout had California's Papa Roach and Florida's Nonpoint. In 2011, Springout had Kentucky's Cage the Elephant and Atlanta's Manchester Orchestra (for their Simple Math album). In 2012, Springout had Awolnation and Neon Trees. In 2013, Springout had Jacksonville's Shinedown.

=== Hot AC and Top 40 ===
The station was owned for a short time by YMF Media LLC through licensee YMF Media South Carolina Licensee LLC. In late 2020, it was acquired by Alpha Media (formerly known as L&L Broadcasting). which also bought Urban Contemporary WHXT, Urban AC WWDM, Modern rock WFOX, and Sports WOIC in the Columbia radio market at the time of purchase.

On March 21, 2014, after playing "Say Goodbye" by Theory of a Deadman, WARQ began stunting with a loop directing listeners to co-owned rock station WFOX. On March 24, at 12 a.m., WARQ ended stunting and changed its format to Hot AC, branded as "Q93.5". However, the station gradually morphed into a Mainstream Top 40 by 2017. On July 2, 2021, WARQ rebranded as "Live 93.5".

=== 93.5 The Bubble ===
On March 13, 2026, at 10 a.m., after playing "Ordinary" by Alex Warren, WARQ began stunting with a broad adult hits-style playlist, looping over approximately 6 hours through the weekend, with cryptic sweepers hinting at a new format "bubbling up" and being set to "pop" the following Monday, March 16 (a nod to Columbia's noted nickname of "Soda City"). The "Live" format had failed to catch any life in the Nielsen Audio market ratings, with a 1.0 in the January 2026 books, the last before the move.

At midnight on March 16, the station relaunched the hot AC format with an adult hits-style presentation, expanding the playlist to include significantly more classic hits from the 1990s onward, as "93.5 The Bubble". The first song after the relaunch was "Golden" by Huntrix, by coincidence doing so the evening after said song had won the Academy Award for Best Original Song at the 2026 Academy Awards.

=== HD Radio ===
WARQ added an HD2 digital subchannel known as "Rock 99.7", launched around Christmas 2016. It feeds an FM translator at 99.7 MHz, playing active rock and modern rock, with only a few minutes of commercials each hour. It airs songs from the 1990s, '00s, '10s, and new alternative rock, like Rock 93.5 did. It later rebranded to ALT 99.7.

WARQ added an HD3 subchannel, airing Christian Radio programming, from the Worship & Word Network. It feeds an FM translator at 105.1 MHz.

An HD4 subchannel was added when co-owned WPCO 1230 AM went silent. That station had played adult album alternative rock on the AM frequency, while it fed an FM translator at 94.9 MHz. Together they were known as "94.9 The Palm." (South Carolina is known as "The Palmetto State.") The AM station was taken off the air in January 2022 and its license was later returned to the FCC. But the programming on the FM translator continues, now fed by WARQ-HD4. The 94.9 translator was bought by Norsan Media, which flipped the translators format to Regional Mexican. The HD-4 still keeps the same format, still under the moniker of "94-9 The Palm".

== Previous logos ==
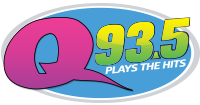
