= WLJI =

- Summerton, South Carolina; United States
- Broadcast area: Columbia, South Carolina; Orangeburg, South Carolina
- Frequency: 98.3 MHz
- Branding: Almighty 98.3

Programming
- Format: Urban contemporary gospel

Ownership
- Owner: Peter Schiff; (Community Broadcasters, LLC)

History
- First air date: March 24, 1997; 28 years ago

Technical information
- Licensing authority: FCC
- Facility ID: 63707
- Class: C3
- ERP: 16,000 watts
- HAAT: 100 meters (328 feet)
- Transmitter coordinates: 33°42′58″N 80°20′44″W

Links
- Public license information: Public file; LMS
- Website: WLJI Online

WLJI (98.3 FM), known as "Almighty 98.3", is a full-time urban contemporary gospel radio station located in the Midlands region of South Carolina. WLJI is licensed to Summerton, a small town located near Sumter. WLJI broadcasts with 16 kW.

== History ==
On March 24, 1997, WLJI signed on the air as a full-time simulcast of WFMV.
