= Quinby, South Carolina =

- Town
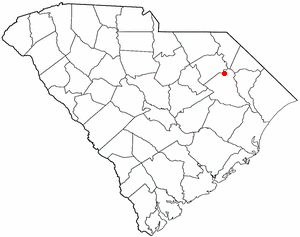
- Location of Quinby in South Carolina
- Coordinates: 34°13′41″N 79°44′08″W
- Country: United States
- State: South Carolina
- County: Florence

Area
  - Total: 1.31 sq mi (3.38 km^{2})
  - Land: 1.31 sq mi (3.38 km^{2})
  - Water: 0 sq mi (0.00 km^{2})
- Elevation: 121 ft (37 m)

Population (2020)
  - Total: 915
  - Density: 700.2/sq mi (270.33/km^{2})
- Time zone: UTC-5 (EST)
  - Summer (DST): UTC-4 (EDT)
- ZIP code: 29506
- Area codes: 843, 854
- FIPS code: 45-58795
- GNIS feature ID: 2407168
- Website: www.townofquinby.com

Quinby is a town in Florence County, South Carolina, United States. As of the 2020 census, Quinby had a population of 915. It is part of the Florence Metropolitan Statistical Area.

== Geography ==
Quinby is located in northern Florence County and is bordered on the south and west by the city of Florence, the county seat. The town limits extend north to Black Creek, a tributary of the Pee Dee River. Interstate 95 passes north and west of the town, with the closest access from Exit 169, 3 miles (5 km) to the north.

According to the United States Census Bureau, the town has a total area of 1.4 square miles (3.5 km^{2}), all land.

== Demographics ==
Historical population
Census	Pop.	Note	%±
1970	788		—
1980	952		20.8%
1990	865		−9.1%
2000	842		−2.7%
2010	932		10.7%
2020	915		−1.8%
U.S. Decennial Census

=== 2020 census ===
Quinby town, South Carolina – Racial and ethnic composition Note: the US Census treats Hispanic/Latino as an ethnic category. This table excludes Latinos from the racial categories and assigns them to a separate category. Hispanics/Latinos may be of any race.
Race / Ethnicity (NH = Non-Hispanic)	Pop 2000	Pop 2010	Pop 2020	% 2000	% 2010	% 2020
White alone (NH)	361	278	227	42.87%	29.83%	24.81%
Black or African American alone (NH)	470	636	641	55.82%	68.24%	70.05%
Native American or Alaska Native alone (NH)	1	0	1	0.12%	0.00%	0.11%
Asian alone (NH)	0	0	2	0.00%	0.00%	0.22%
Native Hawaiian or Pacific Islander alone (NH)	0	0	0	0.00%	0.00%	0.00%
Other race alone (NH)	0	1	0	0.00%	0.11%	0.00%
Mixed race or Multiracial (NH)	7	14	33	0.83%	1.50%	3.61%
Hispanic or Latino (any race)	3	3	11	0.36%	0.32%	1.20%
Total	842	932	915	100.00%	100.00%	100.00%

=== 2000 census ===
As of the census of 2000, there were 842 people, 331 households, and 254 families residing in the town. The population density was 755.6 inhabitants per square mile (291.7/km^{2}). There were 351 housing units at an average density of 315.0 per square mile (121.6/km^{2}). The racial makeup of the town was 42.87% White, 56.18% African American, 0.12% Native American, and 0.83% from two or more races. Hispanic or Latino of any race were 0.36% of the population.

There were 331 households, out of which 30.5% had children under the age of 18 living with them, 63.1% were married couples living together, 12.7% had a female householder with no husband present, and 23.0% were non-families. 22.1% of all households were made up of individuals, and 8.8% had someone living alone who was 65 years of age or older. The average household size was 2.54 and the average family size was 2.97.

In the town, the population was spread out, with 23.4% under the age of 18, 5.5% from 18 to 24, 24.3% from 25 to 44, 29.7% from 45 to 64, and 17.1% who were 65 years of age or older. The median age was 43 years. For every 100 females, there were 92.2 males. For every 100 females age 18 and over, there were 88.0 males.

The median income for a household in the town was $52,639, and the median income for a family was $55,556. Males had a median income of $33,125 versus $25,417 for females. The per capita income for the town was $22,804. About 8.1% of families and 7.8% of the population were below the poverty line, including 13.5% of those under age 18 and 1.8% of those age 65 or over.
