= WFMV (AM) =

Coordinates: 33°57′34″N 81°02′28″W

- Cayce, South Carolina; United States
- Broadcast area: Columbia metropolitan area
- Frequency: 620 kHz

Programming
- Format: Urban Gospel

Ownership
- Owner: Glory Communications Inc.

History
- First air date: August 22, 1958
- Former call signs: WCAY (1958–1981); WLFF (1981–1984); WABX (1984); WTGH (1984–2003); WGCV (2003–2019)

Technical information
- Licensing authority: FCC
- Facility ID: 42020
- Class: D
- Power: 2,500 watts days 126 watts nights
- Translators: 96.1 W241DJ (Columbia) (98.9 MHz) W255DR (Saint Matthews); 107.1 W296EI (Columbia)

Links
- Public license information: Public file; LMS
- Website: columbiainspiration.com facebook.com/WFMVcolumbia

WFMV (620 kHz) is a commercial AM radio station licensed to Cayce, South Carolina, and serving the Columbia metropolitan area. It is owned by Glory Communications and broadcasts an urban gospel radio format.

By day, WFMV is powered at 2,500 watts. But to avoid interfering with other stations on 620 AM, it reduces power at night to only 126 watts. It uses a non-directional antenna at all times. Programming is also heard on two FM translator stations, 96.1 W241DJ and 107.1 W296EI.

== History ==
On August 22, 1958, the station signed on as WCAY. It was Columbia's first fulltime Country music radio station. By the early 1970s, the station faced financial problems as WCOS-FM became the dominant country music station in the market. The station was sold, becoming WLFF with an Adult Standards format. In the mid-1980s, the station was sold again and changed its call sign to WTGH, playing an Urban Gospel format.

In 2003, WTGH was sold to Glory Communications, which kept the format but changed the call letters to WGCV. Glory Communications also owns WQXL in the Columbia radio market. WTGH changed its call sign to WFMV on December 18, 2019, becoming a simulcast of 95.3 WFMV-FM.

The FM station was sold to Christian radio broadcaster "Good News Network," switching its call letters to WJTB-FM. At that point, the AM station became the primary home of WFMV. With two FM translators in the Columbia area, it continues to serve its listeners on both the AM and FM bands.
