= WTQS =

Simulcasting WFRK, Florence, SC
- Cameron, South Carolina, United States
- Frequency: 1490 kHz
- Branding: Orangeburg's News Talk 97.1 WTQS

Programming
- Format: Talk radio
- Affiliations: Premiere Networks, Fox News Radio

Ownership
- Owner: Peter Schiff; (Community Broadcasters, LLC)
- Sister stations: WFRK

History
- First air date: 2008

Technical information
- Licensing authority: FCC
- Facility ID: 160804
- Class: C
- Power: 1,000 watts
- Transmitter coordinates: 33°33′09″N 80°44′38″W
- Translator: 97.1 W246BX (Orangeburg)

Links
- Public license information: Public file; LMS
- Website: cborangeburg.com/wtqs

WTQS (1490 AM) is a radio station licensed to Cameron, South Carolina, United States, serving the Orangeburg-Calhoun area. The station is currently owned by Peter Schiff, through licensee Community Broadcasters, LLC, and is a simulcast of WFRK in Florence.

On May 11, 2015, WTQS was granted a Federal Communications Commission construction permit to move to 1500 kHz, construct a new taller and much more efficient antenna, downgrade from Class C to Class D, increase day power to 5,000 watts, decrease critical hours power from 1,000 watts to 730 watts and discontinue operation at night. The FM station is a 24-7 station.

Programming is conservative talk radio; unlike WFRK, the South Carolina Gamecocks are not broadcast in Orangeburg, as the market is not served by the team. However, WTQS is a member of the Atlanta Braves Radio Network.
