= WHXT =

Radio station in Orangeburg, South Carolina

Coordinates: 33.670°N 80.873°W

- Orangeburg, South Carolina; United States
- Broadcast area: Columbia metropolitan area
- Frequency: 103.9 MHz
- Branding: Hot 103.9 / 93.9

Programming
- Format: Mainstream urban
- Affiliations: Premiere Networks

Ownership
- Owner: Connoisseur Media; (Alpha Media Licensee LLC)
- Sister stations: WARQ, WFOX, WWDM, WSCZ

History
- First air date: September 1973 (as WHCE)
- Former call signs: WHCE (1973–1976); WORG-FM (1976–1985); WORG (1985–1999)
- Call sign meaning: "HoT" (the station's moniker); X is in place of "O"

Technical information
- Licensing authority: FCC
- Facility ID: 50522
- Class: C3
- ERP: 9,200 watts
- HAAT: 162 meters (531 ft)
- Repeater: 93.9 WSCZ (Winnsboro)

Links
- Public license information: Public file; LMS
- Webcast: Listen Live
- Website: hot1039939.com

WHXT (103.9 FM) is a mainstream urban radio station licensed to Orangeburg, South Carolina, and serves the Columbia metropolitan area. The Connoisseur Media outlet is licensed by the Federal Communications Commission (FCC) to broadcast with an effective radiated power (ERP) of 9.2 kW. The station goes by the name Hot 103.9/93.9 and its current slogan is "Columbia's #1 Choice for Blazin' Hip-Hop and R&B." Its studios are on Pineview Road in Columbia, while the transmitter tower is located west of St. Matthews, South Carolina, southeast of Columbia.

== History ==
The station originally signed on in September 1973 as WHCE (call sign meaning We Have Country Entertainment) in Orangeburg with a country music format. It shared property with Top 40-formatted WORG 1580, but was under slightly different ownership. In 1976, WHCE became WORG-FM and switched to a Top 40-adult contemporary hybrid format, simulcasting much of the programming with the AM station in the process.

In the spring of 1989, WORG-FM changed formats to CHR as WKSO with the moniker of 103.9 Kiss-FM (The WORG call letters eventually resurfaced on a new FM station licensed to the nearby community of Elloree). The CHR format lasted until the early 90s when it changed, once again to Mainstream Urban.

For the next several years, the station had various Mainstream Urban formats, including a period where the station simulcasted with WKWQ (now WZMJ) in the Columbia radio market. By June 1999, the station had made a long-planned move into the Columbia market, becoming WHXT with the Hot 103.9 moniker. The station was the first serious challenger to WWDM's long-standing dominance in the Mainstream Urban format, eventually beating them in the Arbitron ratings on several occasions. ICBC bought out WHXT in 2003, and WWDM restructured its format to an Urban AC.

WHXT was home to the nationally syndicated Doug Banks Morning Show until the end of 2007; it is now home to The Breakfast Club.

The station is owned by Alpha Media through licensee Alpha Media Licensee LLC, which also owns Urban AC WWDM, Classic rock WMFX, and Alternative WARQ in the Columbia radio market.

On September 9, 2014, WHXT began simulcasting on WSCZ 93.9 FM.
