= WATN (AM) =

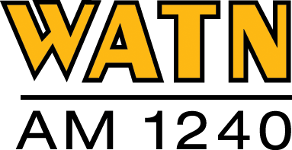
- Watertown, New York; United States
- Frequency: 1240 kHz

Programming
- Format: Talk
- Affiliations: ABC News Radio; Fox News Radio; Compass Media Networks; Premiere Networks; Salem Radio Network; Westwood One

Ownership
- Owner: Community Broadcasters, LLC
- Sister stations: WBDR, WEFX, WOTT, WTOJ

History
- First air date: February 3, 1941
- Call sign meaning: Watertown

Technical information
- Licensing authority: FCC
- Facility ID: 11624
- Class: C
- Power: 1,000 watts unlimited
- Transmitter coordinates: 43°58′49.22″N 75°56′10.73″W

Links
- Public license information: Public file; LMS
- Webcast: Listen live
- Website: cbwatertown.com/watn/

WATN (1240 AM) is a commercial radio station in Watertown, New York. The station airs a talk radio format and is owned by Community Broadcasters, LLC.

WATN is powered at 1,000 watts using a non-directional antenna. The transmitter is off Wealtha Avenue in Watertown.

== Programming ==
Most weekday programs on WATN are nationally syndicated conservative talk shows. Two local programs are heard each weekday: Hotline, an hour-long lunchtime show hosted by former Watertown Mayor Jeffrey Graham, and Live at Five, an afternoon drive time show hosted by Glenn Curry. Syndicated hosts include Hugh Hewitt, Chris Plante, Sean Hannity, Mark Levin, John Batchelor and Red Eye Radio.

Weekend syndicated hosts include Gary Sullivan (home repair), Bill Handel (law), Ron Ananian (car repair), Michio Kaku (science), Joe Pags, Howie Carr and a Sunday night oldies show. Most hours begin with world and national news from CBS News Radio.

== History ==
WATN first signed on the air on February 3, 1941. It is Watertown's oldest radio station, beating 1300 WWNY (now 790 WTNY) by three months.

WATN was first owned by the Watertown Broadcasting Corporation with studios at 118 Washington Street. It originally broadcast with 250 watts and has always used WATN as its call sign.

On May 22, 2026, WATN began carrying ABC News Radio immediately after CBS News signed off.
