= WWDM =

Radio station in Sumter, South Carolina

Coordinates: 34.051°N 80.682°W

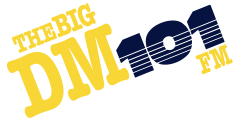
- Sumter, South Carolina; United States
- Broadcast area: Columbia metropolitan area
- Frequency: 101.3 MHz
- Branding: "1013 The Big DM"

Programming
- Format: Urban adult contemporary
- Affiliations: Premiere Networks; Westwood One

Ownership
- Owner: Connoisseur Media; (Alpha Media Licensee LLC)
- Sister stations: WARQ, WHXT, WFOX, WSCZ

History
- First air date: 1961
- Former call signs: WFIG-FM (1961–1975)
- Call sign meaning: WW; DM = used in "Big DM 101 FM branding

Technical information
- Licensing authority: FCC
- Facility ID: 58398
- Class: C
- ERP: 100,000 watts horizontal 82,000 watts vertical
- HAAT: 403 meters (1,322 ft)

Links
- Public license information: Public file; LMS
- Webcast: Listen Live
- Website: thebigdm.com

WWDM (101.3 FM) is an urban adult contemporary radio station licensed to Sumter, South Carolina and serves the Columbia metropolitan area. The Connoisseur Media outlet is licensed by the Federal Communications Commission (FCC) to broadcast with an effective radiated power (ERP) of 100 kW from a transmitter east of Fort Jackson. The station goes by the name 1013 The Big DM and its current slogan is "Your #1 Station for R&B". Its studios are located in Columbia.

== History ==
101.3 began as WFIG-FM in 1961, licensed to Sumter, South Carolina, with 3,000 watts of power. At the time, the station was simulcasting the country format of sister AM WFIG 1290.

In 1973, DJ Pete Boss convinced Miles to allow him the opportunity to program R&B music on WFIG-FM during the evening hours of 7 to 10 PM in exchange for selling the advertising time for his show. The R&B show became successful and the hours were eventually extended throughout the rest of the broadcast day on WFIG-FM. In 1975, the FM call letters were changed to WWDM to solidify its change to full-time urban contemporary.

In 1976, WWDM increased its transmitting power from the 3,000 watts that it was licensed at sign-on, to 100,000 watts. Because of the station's geographical location near the center of the state, as well as being one of the few high-powered FMs in the area at the time, over time, with excellent programming and attention paid to public service, the station became an important voice in the South Carolina African-American community. It has won numerous awards over the years for its news programming and features, which contributed to WWDM's dominance over most urban stations in the market that came and went.

In the mid-1980s, the station languished in the middle of the Columbia ratings, bested by lower-power stations in similar formats, licensed to Columbia. Then-owner and General Manager John Marshall sought higher ratings and sales. He engaged consultant Dean Landsman to conduct market research and to consult the station. Under Landsman's programming (with heavy research and computer programs written by Marshall and Landsman), the station became format dominant, as well as going on to rank either number 1 or 2 in the Columbia Arbitron ratings. Landsman remained as consultant, and brought in Program Director Andre Carson. Under Carson as PD the station ranked at the top of the market. Marshall retired and put the station in the hands of Steve Paterson as GM.

By the late 1990s, long after Landsman and Carson were gone, and Marshall had sold the property, WWDM suffered a minor setback when it was outranked in listenership by new-coming urban stations WLXC (the only other Urban AC) and WHXT. WWDM, at the time, played hip hop and R&B. To curtail excessive competition, ICBC (the owners) bought WHXT, and WWDM restructured its urban contemporary format to serve the adult Black demographics.

Today, WWDM is home to two syndicated shows: The Steve Harvey Morning Show and The D.L. Hughley Show in the afternoons.

The station is owned by Alpha Media through licensee Alpha Media Licensee LLC, which also owns Urban Contemporary WHXT, Classic rock WFOX, and Hot AC WARQ in the Columbia radio market which acquired the stations in a buyout from Inner City Broadcasting Corporation.
