= WSPX (FM) =

- Bowman, South Carolina; United States
- Broadcast area: Orangeburg, South Carolina
- Frequency: 94.5 MHz
- Branding: Almighty 94.5

Programming
- Format: Urban gospel

Ownership
- Owner: Peter Schiff; (Community Broadcasters, LLC)
- Sister stations: WGFG, WQKI-FM

Technical information
- Licensing authority: FCC
- Facility ID: 54503
- Class: A
- ERP: 3,500 watts
- HAAT: 132.4 meters (434 ft)
- Transmitter coordinates: 33°19′13″N 80°43′52″W

Links
- Public license information: Public file; LMS
- Website: cborangeburg.com/almighty945/

WSPX (94.5 MHz) is an FM radio station broadcasting an urban gospel format. Licensed to Bowman, South Carolina, United States, the station is currently owned by Peter Schiff, through licensee Community Broadcasters, LLC.
