= WFRK =

Radio station in Quinby–Florence, South Carolina

- Quinby, South Carolina; United States
- Broadcast area: Florence, South Carolina
- Frequency: 95.3 MHz
- Branding: Live 95

Programming
- Format: Talk
- Affiliations: Fox News Radio; Premiere Networks; Westwood One

Ownership
- Owner: Community Broadcasters, LLC
- Sister stations: WTQS

History
- First air date: 2010
- Call sign meaning: "Frank" (previous format)

Technical information
- Licensing authority: FCC
- Facility ID: 183329
- Class: A
- ERP: 3,900 watts
- HAAT: 125 meters (410 ft)
- Transmitter coordinates: 34°13′48.6″N 79°44′48.2″W

Links
- Public license information: Public file; LMS
- Website: cbpeedee.com/wfrk953/

WFRK (95.3 FM), known as "Live 95", is a talk formatted radio station licensed to Quinby, South Carolina. The station is owned by Community Broadcasters, LLC and is simulcast on WTQS.

== History ==
Originally, Frank FM aired on W246AW 97.1, a translator with 250 watts which simulcast the WSIM HD-2 channel. Later, Frank FM became a full power station at 95.3. Music came from the 1960s through the present, with artists that included Jimmy Buffett, The Beatles, Rod Stewart, Madonna, Hootie & the Blowfish and Phil Collins. The slogan was "We play it all".

On July 19, 2012, WFRK began moving to a talk format as Live 95, while Frank FM returned to the translator and is again branded "97.1 Frank FM". The changed was planned for August 1, but on July 16, WJMX (970 AM) dropped Rush Limbaugh, and WFRK announced July 18 that it was adding the show. Other shows would include "Kinard and Koffee in the Morning". After Limbaugh's passing in 2020, Premiere Networks announced that its evening host Buck Sexton and Fox Sports Radio personality Clay Travis would take over Limbaugh's time slot as The Clay Travis and Buck Sexton Show beginning June 21, 2021. Unlike Limbaugh's program, The Clay Travis and Buck Sexton Show airs on WJMX, owned by iHeartMedia.
