= WDXY =

Radio station in Sumter, South Carolina

- Sumter, South Carolina; United States
- Frequency: 1240 kHz
- Branding: News Talk 1240

Programming
- Language: English
- Format: News Talk Information
- Affiliations: ABC Radio, Gamecock Sports Network (men's basketball)

Ownership
- Owner: Community Broadcasters, LLC

History
- First air date: May 23, 1960

Technical information
- Licensing authority: FCC
- Facility ID: 55267
- Class: C
- Power: 1,000 watts unlimited
- Transmitter coordinates: 33°54′16.00″N 80°19′25.00″W
- Translator: 105.9 Megahertz (W290AY)

Links
- Public license information: Public file; LMS
- Website: cbsumter.com/wdxy1240am/

WDXY (1240 AM) is a conservative radio station broadcasting a News Talk Information format. It is licensed to Sumter, South Carolina, United States. The station is currently owned by Community Broadcasters, LLC and features programming from ABC Radio.

== Programming ==
Programming on WDXY includes mostly national conservative talk programming, such as Dan Bongino, Sean Hannity, and Glenn Beck. The station also airs a local morning show, "Wake Up Carolina".
