= WFOX (FM) =

Radio station in St. Andrews, South Carolina

Coordinates: 34.099°N 81.080°W

- St. Andrews, South Carolina; United States
- Broadcast area: Columbia metropolitan area
- Frequency: 102.3 MHz
- Branding: Fox 102.3

Programming
- Format: Classic rock

Ownership
- Owner: Connoisseur Media; (Alpha Media Licensee LLC)
- Sister stations: WARQ; WHXT; WSCZ; WWDM

History
- First air date: January 23, 1985 (as WWGO)
- Former call signs: WWGO (1985–1987); WMFX (1987–2026)
- Call sign meaning: "Fox"

Technical information
- Licensing authority: FCC
- Facility ID: 19471
- Class: A
- ERP: 6,000 watts
- HAAT: 100 meters (330 ft)

Links
- Public license information: Public file; LMS
- Webcast: Listen live
- Website: www.fox1023.com

WFOX (102.3 MHz) is a commercial FM radio station licensed to St. Andrews, South Carolina, and serving the Columbia metropolitan area. The Connoisseur Media outlet broadcasts a classic rock radio format, with a few alternative rock artists also in the playlist. The station goes by the name Fox 102.3. Its studios and offices are located on Pineview Drive in Columbia.

WFOX has an effective radiated power (ERP) of 6,000 watts. Its transmitter is on Winterwood Road near Monticello Road.

== History ==
On January 23, 1985, the station first signed on as WWGO. It played a mix of oldies and adult contemporary music under the "Go 102" handle. This format finished in the top five the first rating period with disc jockey John Anderson hosting mornings. It was sold in early 1987 after its second rating period saw a drop.

New owners changed the format to album rock, with a lean musically toward classic rock. The new call sign was WMFX, using the moniker Fox 102. The changes paid off as the station was usually placed within the Top 5 of the Arbitron ratings since that time.

In 1994, the station adjusted its format further toward classic rock and added the syndicated John Boy and Billy show for mornings.

The station was owned by Alpha Media through Alpha Media Licensee LLC, which also owned WHXT, WWDM, and WARQ in the Columbia radio market.

In March 2014, WMFX changed to mainstream rock, retaining the classic rock songs while adding alternative rock selections, from mostly 1990s artists such as Nirvana, Smashing Pumpkins, and The Foo Fighters. Groups from the 2000s such as Nickelback, Staind, Hoobastank and Trapt are also heard on WMFX.

Alpha Media merged with Connoisseur Media on September 4, 2025. The call sign was changed to WFOX—previously used by Connoisseur-owned WICC-FM—on February 1, 2026.
