= WQKI-FM =

- Orangeburg, South Carolina; United States
- Frequency: 95.7 MHz
- Branding: Jamz 95.7

Programming
- Format: Classic hip hop

Ownership
- Owner: Community Broadcasters, LLC
- Sister stations: WGFG, WSPX

History
- First air date: December 8, 1987 (as WIGL at 102.9)
- Former call signs: WIGL (1987–2003)
- Former frequencies: 102.9 MHz (1987–2021)

Technical information
- Licensing authority: FCC
- Facility ID: 6484
- Class: A
- ERP: 4,000 watts
- HAAT: 123.3 meters
- Transmitter coordinates: 33°26′34″N 80°48′14″W

Links
- Public license information: Public file; LMS
- Webcast: Listen Live
- Website: cborangeburg.com/jamz

WQKI-FM (95.7 MHz) is a commercial radio station licensed to Orangeburg, South Carolina. It airs a classic hip hop radio format and is owned by Community Broadcasters, LLC.

WQKI-FM has a construction permit issued by the Federal Communications Commission to move its frequency to 95.7 MHz and slightly increase its effective radiated power (ERP) to 4,000 watts from the current output of 3,100 watts.

== History ==
The station went on the air as WIGL on December 8, 1987. On November 7, 2003, the station changed its call sign to the current WQKI-FM.

WQKI-FM planned a move to 95.7 FM in Batesburg-Leesville; the owner was Willis Broadcasting from Tennessee before the station was later purchased by Miller Communications, Inc.

Miller Communications sold WQKI-FM, 11 other South Carolina radio stations, and several translators to Community Broadcasters, LLC for $2.5 million, in a transaction that was consummated on January 7, 2016.

In December 2022, WQKI-FM dropped its urban oldies format and began stunting with Christmas music. It launched a classic hip hop format on December 26, branded as "Jamz 95.7". The first song under the new format was 50 Cent's "In da Club".
