= WAHT =

Simulcasting WCCP-FM Clemson, South Carolina
- Cowpens, South Carolina; United States
- Broadcast area: Clemson–Spartanburg, South Carolina
- Frequency: 1560 kHz
- Branding: 105.5 The Roar

Programming
- Format: Sports radio
- Affiliations: Infinity Sports Network

Ownership
- Owner: John and Blake Byrne; (Byrne Acquisition Group, LLC)

History
- First air date: 1969; 57 years ago
- Former call signs: WCCP (1969–1988); WBES (1988–1989); WCCP (1989–1997)

Technical information
- Licensing authority: FCC
- Facility ID: 24482
- Class: D
- Power: 15,000 watts (day); 870 watts (critical hours)
- Transmitter coordinates: 34°42′04″N 82°49′30″W
- Translator: 97.5 W248DD (Cowpens)

Links
- Public license information: Public file; LMS
- Webcast: Listen Live
- Website: theroarfm.com

WAHT (1560 kHz) is a commercial AM radio station licensed to Cowpens, South Carolina, and serving Clemson and Spartanburg. WAHT offers a sports format, simulcasting WCCP-FM 105.5 FM in Clemson. Local hosts are heard during the day on weekdays, with CBS Sports Radio airing nights and weekends. The station is owned by John and Blake Byrne, through licensee Byrne Acquisition Group, LLC.

By day, WAHT transmits with 15,000 watts, but because 1560 AM is a clear channel frequency, WAHT must sign off at night to avoid interference. During critical hours, WAHT broadcasts with 870 watts. The station uses a non-directional antenna at all times. WAHT is also heard on 250-watt FM translator W248DD at 97.5 MHz.

== History ==
WCCP/1560 signed on in 1969 by Matt Phillips (who later founded WRIX-AM-FM in Anderson, South Carolina). The callsign was previously assigned to Savannah, Georgia, on 1450 kHz; that station became WBYG and is not longer on the air. Former CBS Morning News anchor Jane Robelot worked at WCCP in the late 1970s and early 1980s.

On April 23, 2007, WAHT changed its format to sports, simulcasting WCCP-FM (then at 104.9).
