= Bowman, South Carolina =

- Town
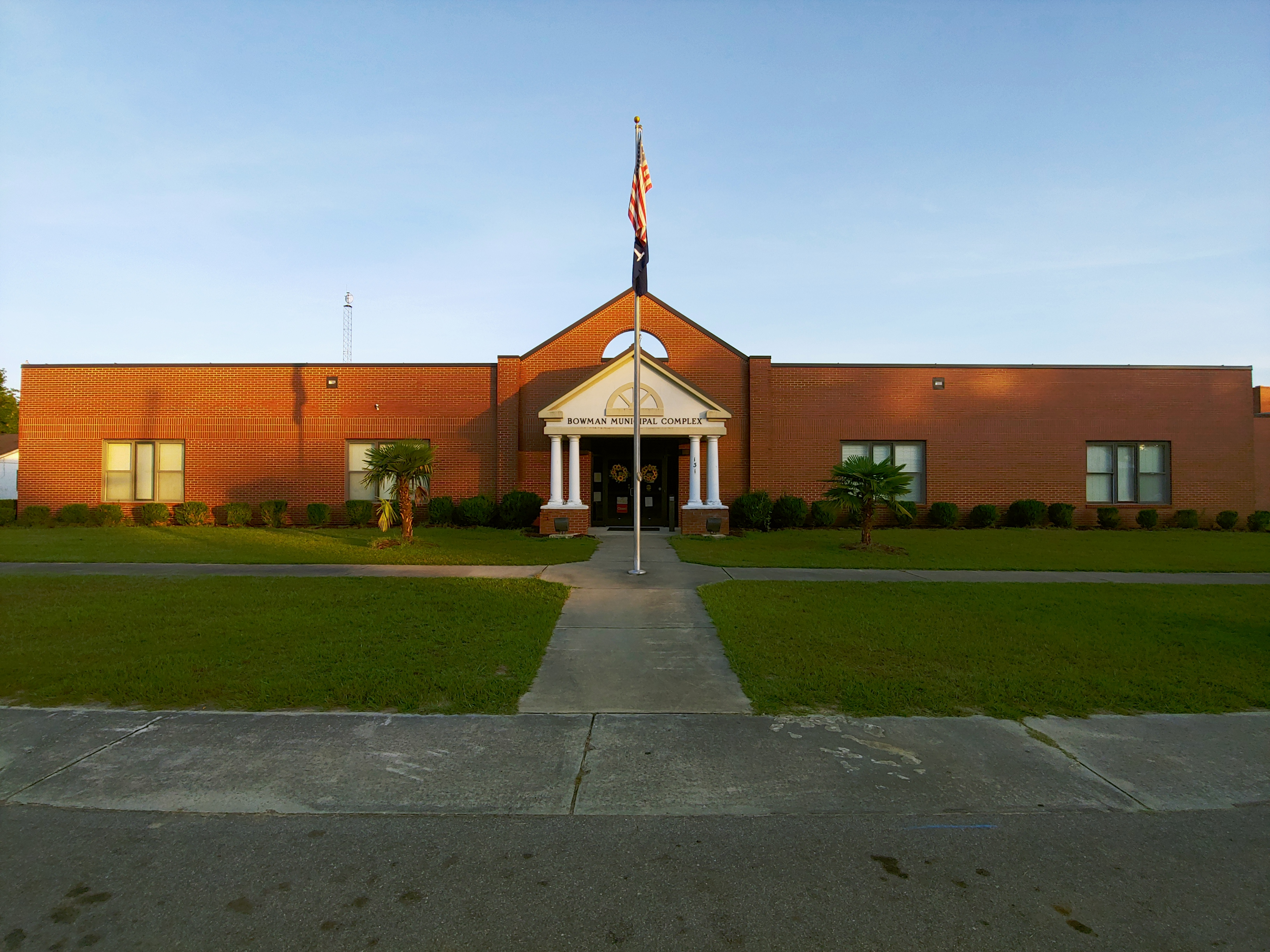
- Town hall

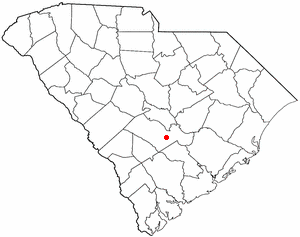
- Location in Orangeburg County, South Carolina
- Coordinates: 33°20′54″N 80°41′03″W
- Country: United States
- State: South Carolina
- County: Orangeburg

Area
  - Total: 1.18 sq mi (3.05 km^{2})
  - Land: 1.18 sq mi (3.05 km^{2})
  - Water: 0 sq mi (0.00 km^{2})
- Elevation: 138 ft (42 m)

Population (2020)
  - Total: 788
  - Density: 669.6/sq mi (258.54/km^{2})
- Time zone: UTC-5 (EST)
  - Summer (DST): UTC-4 (EDT)
- ZIP code: 29018
- Area codes: 803, 839
- FIPS code: 45-07840
- GNIS feature ID: 2405307
- Website: townofbowman.sc.gov

Bowman is a town in Orangeburg County, South Carolina, United States. As of the 2020 census, Bowman had a population of 788.

== Geography ==
According to the United States Census Bureau, the town has a total area of 1.2 square miles (3.1 km^{2}), all land.

== History ==
Interest in building a town at the intersection of present-day US 178 (Charleston Highway) and S.C. 210 (Branchville-Providence Roads) was evidenced in the acquisition of substantial properties of the Reddick A. Bowman estate by one Samuel W. Dibble, Sr. of Orangeburg, SC in 1887. The Smoak Tramway, a six-mile logging railroad extending from Branchville toward north Four Holes Swamp which was chartered in 1884, was also targeted for acquisition by Dibble's associate, Thomas M. Raysor, who operated the Raysor Mill near Stokes. These actions, aimed at developing and exploiting the agricultural and lumbering potential of an area that had remained rather dormant since the American Civil War, were taking place in the late 1880s. These represented the prelude to the chartering of the future Town of Bowman and the transportation and land development organizations and operations which preceded its chartering.

The site chosen for Bowman was actually situated in the center of a rice farming country, later transformed into a major cotton-producing area where the land has a clay sub-soil, ideal for this and other crops. it was located on an old road that was traveled in colonial days by people going from Charleston to Orangeburg, and which was once alleged to have been known as Oak Ridge, a plateau about ten miles long and five miles wide.

One of the oldest remaining operating companies located in Bowman, South Carolina, is V.P. Kiser Lumber Company, which now produces pine shingles. Some wood from Kiser Lumber Company was used to build Bowman's UFO Welcome Center.

== Tornado ==
On the afternoon of December 5, 1977, a tornado, approaching from the west parallel to Highway 210, struck the downtown area. Three people were injured, the streets were littered with glass and debris, a few trailers were demolished, buildings were unroofed, and a power failure occurred. No people were killed.

== Post office ==
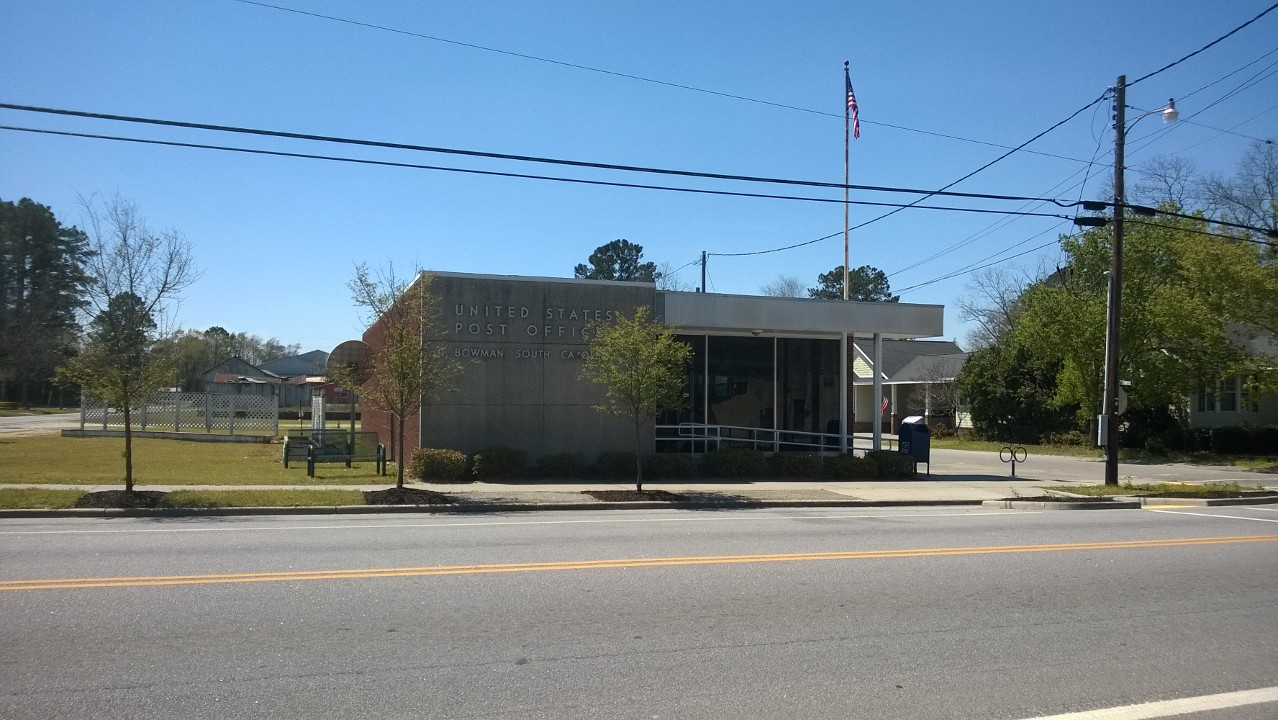
Post office

In the early years immediately prior to the founding of Bowman, mail service amounted to once or twice-a-week deliveries from Orangeburg by horse and buggy to outlying communities, such as Rileys, Connors and Ruples. The first post office in the Town of Bowman was located at Railroad Avenue and Ott Street (later Main Street) in the store of John W. Berry, a pioneer merchant, and he served as the first postmaster. The building also served as a residence, and it had the first telephone between Bowman and Branchville. The postal system of those early years in Bowman's history involved horse and buggy deliveries about twice a week from Orangeburg, and patrons from both town and surrounding areas had to pick up their mail from the post office until rural routes and carriers were organized to deliver mail outside the town limits in the early 1900s. Three rural routes were operational by 1907. The earliest carriers of record were W. H. Dukes, W. L. Bishop, O. P. Evans and Andrew Stroman, Sr. A fourth route was later added to serve the surrounding area, since reduced to three, and finally to the current two routes.

== War memorial ==
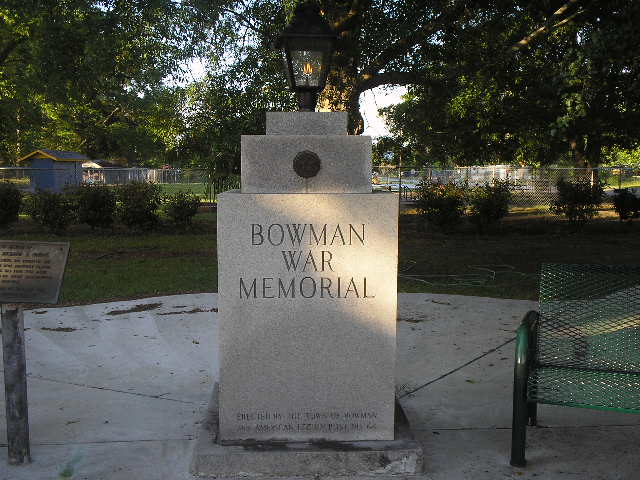
War Memorial and Eternal Flame - 1987

In 1987, a monument and eternal flame were constructed for residents who died in war:

World War I

- James Edward Easterlin
- John Wesley Weathers
- John Moorer Livingston

World War II

- James Edmund Berry
- Thomas Richard Edwards
- Leonard Everett Berry
- George Arthur Kemmerlin
- Benjamin Franklin Knight

Vietnam War

- James Allen Johnson
- Henry Dennis West, III
- Jessie Clarence Felder

== UFO Welcome Center ==
Bowman is home to the former UFO Welcome Center roadside attraction, which is "Major Fun" according to Roadside America. As of 2024 the UFO Welcome Center in Bowman, South Carolina unfortunately has burned down and is no longer available to visit. There are no plans on rebuilding the Welcome Center at this time.

== Demographics ==
Historical population
| Census | Pop. | Note | %± |
|---|---|---|---|
| 1900 | 134 | | — |
| 1910 | 327 | | 144.0% |
| 1920 | 733 | | 124.2% |
| 1930 | 754 | | 2.9% |
| 1940 | 799 | | 6.0% |
| 1950 | 857 | | 7.3% |
| 1960 | 1,106 | | 29.1% |
| 1970 | 1,095 | | −1.0% |
| 1980 | 1,137 | | 3.8% |
| 1990 | 1,063 | | −6.5% |
| 2000 | 1,198 | | 12.7% |
| 2010 | 968 | | −19.2% |
| 2020 | 788 | | −18.6% |
U.S. Decennial Census

Bowman town, South Carolina – Racial and ethnic composition Note: the US Census treats Hispanic/Latino as an ethnic category. This table excludes Latinos from the racial categories and assigns them to a separate category. Hispanics/Latinos may be of any race.
| Race / Ethnicity (NH = Non-Hispanic) | Pop 2000 | Pop 2010 | Pop 2020 | % 2000 | % 2010 | % 2020 |
|---|---|---|---|---|---|---|
| White alone (NH) | 352 | 270 | 216 | 29.38% | 27.89% | 27.41% |
| Black or African American alone (NH) | 823 | 675 | 542 | 68.70% | 69.73% | 68.78% |
| Native American or Alaska Native alone (NH) | 4 | 0 | 2 | 0.33% | 0.00% | 0.25% |
| Asian alone (NH) | 2 | 1 | 1 | 0.17% | 0.10% | 0.13% |
| Native Hawaiian or Pacific Islander alone (NH) | 0 | 0 | 0 | 0.00% | 0.00% | 0.00% |
| Other race alone (NH) | 0 | 2 | 3 | 0.00% | 0.21% | 0.38% |
| Mixed race or Multiracial (NH) | 9 | 3 | 18 | 0.75% | 0.31% | 2.28% |
| Hispanic or Latino (any race) | 8 | 17 | 6 | 0.67% | 1.76% | 0.76% |
| Total | 1,198 | 968 | 788 | 100.00% | 100.00% | 100.00% |

As of the 2020 United States census, there were 788 people, 317 households, and 150 families residing in the town.

=== 2000 census ===
As of the census of 2000, there were 1,198 people, 463 households, and 321 families residing in the town. The population density was 1,034.5 inhabitants per square mile (399.4/km^{2}). There were 532 housing units at an average density of 459.4 per square mile (177.4/km^{2}). The racial makeup of the town was 29.47% Caucasian, 68.86% African American, 0.33% Native American, 0.17% Asian, 0.33% from other races, and 0.83% from two or more races. Hispanic or Latino people of any race were 0.67% of the population.

There were 463 households, out of which 33.0% had children under the age of 18 living with them, 39.1% were married couples living together, 24.4% had a female householder with no husband present, and 30.5% were non-families. 28.5% of all households were made up of individuals, and 14.3% had someone living alone who was 65 years of age or older. The average household size was 2.58 and the average family size was 3.16.

In the town, the population was spread out, with 27.4% under the age of 18, 9.6% from 18 to 24, 26.9% from 25 to 44, 21.8% from 45 to 64, and 14.4% who were 65 years of age or older. The median age was 37 years. For every 100 females, there were 88.4 males. For every 100 females age 18 and over, there were 79.4 males.

The median income for a household in the town was $22,750, and the median income for a family was $29,167. Males had a median income of $25,583 versus $18,828 for females. The per capita income for the town was $11,662. About 23.0% of families and 30.3% of the population were below the poverty line, including 39.4% of those under age 18 and 25.0% of those age 65 or over.
