= WOLH =

Radio station in Florence, South Carolina

- Florence, South Carolina; United States
- Broadcast area: Florence, South Carolina
- Frequency: 1230 kHz
- Branding: ESPN 96.3 - 1230

Programming
- Format: Sports
- Affiliations: ESPN Radio

Ownership
- Owner: Community Broadcasters, LLC

History
- First air date: 1937 (as WOLS)
- Former call signs: WOLS (1937–2005); WTIX - 12/01/2005; WOLS - 06/22/2006; WOLH - 02/12/2008

Technical information
- Licensing authority: FCC
- Facility ID: 73400
- Class: C
- Power: 1,000 watts unlimited
- Transmitter coordinates: 34°13′48″N 79°44′49″W
- Translator: 96.3 W242CB (Florence)

Links
- Public license information: Public file; LMS
- Website: cbpeedee.com/wolh/

WOLH (1230 AM) is a radio station airing a sports format known as "ESPN 96.3 - 1230". Licensed to Florence, South Carolina, United States, the station serves the Florence area. The station is owned by Community Broadcasters, LLC. The station's programming also aired on WHYM in Lake City and W255BD in Darlington.

== FM Translator ==
WOLH programming is relayed to an FM translator in addition to the main frequency on 1230 kHz.

Broadcast translator for WOLH
Call sign	Frequency	City of license	FID	ERP (W)	Class	FCC info
W242CB	96.3 FM	Florence, South Carolina	142029	170	D	LMS

== History ==
WOLH at 1230 AM was once WOLS, signing on in 1937; it was the first radio station in Florence, South Carolina. WOLS was once owned and operated by Melvin Purvis (1903–1960), the former FBI agent credited with capturing or killing John Dillinger and Pretty Boy Floyd in the 1930s. Studios were located on the 100 block of S. Dargan Street in downtown Florence. Daytime power was 1,000 watts but reduced to 500 watts at sunset.

WOLS was home to the "Holiday Show" Hosted by Doug Williams. The program was on the air for 28 years before moving to television for another 8 years.

WOLS was an adult standards station using the Stardust format. Most of its programming was also heard on WHYM. Both stations aired some Christian programming.

In 2003, WOLS was bought by the Colonial Radio Group and was known as "The Sports Animal."It featured Sporting News Radio programming and had a weekly sports talk radio show hosted by on-air personalities Jeff Andrulonis and Bradley Turner. When GHB Broadcasting sold the station and WHYM to Estuardo Rodriguez in 2006, the call letters WTIX were used. On February 12, 2008, the call sign was changed to WOLH so that the old call sign "WOLS" could be moved to a Charlotte, North Carolina, station upon its switch to oldies. WOLH was then known as Radio Fiesta, with a Regional Mexican format, with programming also heard on WHYM, WODR and WFMO.

Miller Communications, Inc. bought WOLH and WHYM in 2008. The switch to the talk format was made in 2009.

On October 4, 2012, WOLH changed its format to Rhythmic oldies, branded as "Jammin' 98.9" (the 98.9 frequency in the branding is for FM translator W255BD 98.9 FM in Darlington, South Carolina).

On March 1, 2013, WOLH changed its format to sports, with programming from ESPN Radio. The Press Box Radio show with Allen Smothers and Emerson Phillips would remain, as would South Carolina Gamecocks basketball; Gamecocks baseball was being added. ESPN programming would include Major League Baseball, NBA basketball and college football.

Miller Communications sold WOLH, 11 other South Carolina radio stations, and several translators to Community Broadcasters, LLC for $2.5 million, in a transaction that was consummated on January 7, 2016.
