= WPDT =

- Coward, South Carolina; United States
- Frequency: 105.1 MHz
- Branding: Almighty 105.1

Programming
- Format: Urban gospel

Ownership
- Owner: Peter Schiff; (Community Broadcasters, LLC)

History
- First air date: 1991-07-26 (as WRHA)
- Former call signs: WRHA (1991–1995)

Technical information
- Licensing authority: FCC
- Facility ID: 66643
- Class: C3
- ERP: 18,000 watts
- HAAT: 117 meters
- Transmitter coordinates: 33°58′2″N 79°43′3″W

Links
- Public license information: Public file; LMS
- Website: WPDT Online

WPDT (105.1 FM) is a radio station broadcasting an urban gospel format. Licensed to Coward, South Carolina, United States. The station is currently owned by Peter Schiff, through licensee Community Broadcasters, LLC.

== History ==
The station went on the air as WRHA on 1991-07-26. On 1995-05-19, the station changed its call sign to the current WPDT.
