= WWKT-FM =

- Kingstree, South Carolina; United States
- Broadcast area: Florence, South Carolina
- Frequency: 99.3 MHz
- Branding: 99.3 The Cat

Programming
- Format: Country

Ownership
- Owner: Community Broadcasters, LLC

History
- Call sign meaning: The Cat

Technical information
- Licensing authority: FCC
- Facility ID: 15836
- Class: C3
- ERP: 11,000 watts
- HAAT: 149.9 meters
- Transmitter coordinates: 33°54′7.00″N 79°59′52.00″W

Links
- Public license information: Public file; LMS
- Webcast: Listen Live
- Website: WWKT-FM Online

WWKT-FM (99.3 MHz) is a radio station broadcasting a country music format. Licensed to Kingstree, South Carolina, United States, the station serves the Florence/Sumter/Kingstree area. The station is currently owned by Community Broadcasters, LLC. The station is commonly known as "99-3, the Cat", and their line-up includes "Palmer In The Morning" featuring Ed Palmer from 6-10am weekdays, Haley from 10a-3p, Matt Jordan from 3p-7p, and 'The Big Time With Whitney Allen" from 7p-midnight .

Logo under previous branding
