= WEFX =

Coordinates: 43.820°N 76.091°W

- Henderson, New York; United States
- Broadcast area: Watertown, New York
- Frequency: 100.7 MHz
- Branding: 100.7 The Eagle

Programming
- Format: Country music
- Affiliations: Premiere Networks; Westwood One

Ownership
- Owner: Community Broadcasters, LLC

History
- First air date: 1991 (as WOTT-FM)
- Former call signs: WOTT-FM (1991–2009)
- Call sign meaning: WatErtown's FoX (previous format)

Technical information
- Licensing authority: FCC
- Facility ID: 30799
- Class: A
- ERP: 6,000 watts
- HAAT: 100 meters (330 ft)

Links
- Public license information: Public file; LMS
- Website: cbwatertown.com/theeagle

WEFX (100.7 FM, "100.7 The Eagle") is a commercial radio station licensed to Henderson, New York, United States. It is owned by Community Broadcasters, LLC, and airs a country music radio format.

The radio studios and offices are on Wealtha Avenue in Watertown, New York. The transmitter is on Paul Road at Smithfield Road in Adams, New York. WEFX is a Class A FM station with an effective radiated power (ERP) of 6,000 watts.

== History ==
In 1991, the station first signed on the air. Its original call sign was WOTT-FM. It was the sister station of WOTT 1410 AM (now WNER).

A classic hits format was launched on 100.7 on February 11, 2009. WEFX uses the frequency formerly occupied by WOTT, which moved to 94.1 in Calcium, New York, on February 9, 2009.

As a classic hits station, WEFX played music from the 1960s, 1970s, and 1980s. It used the slogan "Plays the music you grew up with."

On September 6, 2012, WEFX changed its format from classic hits to country music. The station is branded as "100.7 The Eagle".
