= List of radio stations in South Carolina =

The following is a list of FCC-licensed radio stations in the U.S. state of South Carolina, which can be sorted by their call signs, frequencies, cities of license, licensees, and programming formats.

== List of radio stations ==
Call sign	Frequency	City of license	Licensee	Format
WAAW	94.7 FM	Williston	Wisdom, LLC	Sports (FSR)
WABB	1390 AM	Belton	The Power Foundation	Southern gospel
WABV	1590 AM	Abbeville	R & M Christian Broadcasting, LLC	Classic hits/Oldies
WAFJ	88.3 FM	Belvedere	Radio Training Network, Inc.	Contemporary Christian
WAGP	88.7 FM	Beaufort	Community Broadcasting Corp. of Beaufort, Inc.	Christian talk
WAHP	88.5 FM	Due West	Radio Training Network, Inc.	Contemporary worship music (HIS Radio Praise)
WAHT	1560 AM	Cowpens	Byrne Acquisition Group, LLC	Sports (WCCP-FM simulcast; ISN)
WAIM	1230 AM	Anderson	Palmetto Broadcasting Company, Inc.	News/Talk
WALC	100.5 FM	Charleston	Radio Training Network, Inc.	Christian radio (HIS Radio)
WALD	1080 AM	Johnsonville	Glory Communications, Inc.	Religious
WARQ	93.5 FM	Columbia	L&L Licensee, LLC	Hot adult contemporary
WASC	1530 AM	Spartanburg	New South Broadcasting Corporation	Urban Oldies
WAVF	101.7 FM	Hanahan	Saga South Communications, LLC	Adult hits
WAVO	1150 AM	Rock Hill	Blue Ridge Broadcasting Corporation	Contemporary Christian
WAYA-FM	100.9 FM	Ridgeville	Hope Media Group	Contemporary Christian
WAYS	1050 AM	Conway	Cumulus Licensing LLC	Sports (FSR)
WAZS	980 AM	Summerville	Norsan Communications and Management, Inc.	Regional Mexican
WBAJ	890 AM	Blythewood	Bible Clarity	Religious
WBCU	1460 AM	Union	Union-Carolina Broadcasting Company, Inc.	Country
WBEI-LP	102.9 FM	Charleston	Bishop England High School	Catholic
WBHC-FM	92.1 FM	Hampton	Bocock Communications, LLC	Hot adult contemporary
WBIJ	88.7 FM	Saluda	Radio Training Network, Inc.	Contemporary Christian
WBLR	1430 AM	Batesburg	Augusta Radio Fellowship Institute, Inc.	Christian (Good News Network)
WBPB	1540 AM	Pickens	Berea Baptist Broadcasting, Spanish	Spanish religious
WBSC-LP	102.3 FM	Bamberg	Rising High Foundation	Oldies
WBZF	98.5 FM	Hartsville	Cumulus Licensing LLC	Urban contemporary gospel
WCAM	1590 AM	Camden	Kershaw Radio Corp.	Classic country
WCCP-FM	105.5 FM	Clemson	Byrne Acquisition Group, LLC	Sports (WW1)
WCDC	950 AM	Moncks Corner	The Moody Bible Institute of Chicago	Christian
WCEO	840 AM	Columbia	Norsan Broadcasting WCEO, LLC	Spanish
WCFJ	92.1 FM	Irmo	Radio Training Network	Christian radio (HIS Radio)
WCGF-LP	104.3 FM	Greer	Greer Christian Radio, Inc.	Religious Teaching
WCKI	1300 AM	Greer	Mediatrix SC, Inc.	Catholic
WCKN	92.5 FM	Moncks Corner	Saga South Communications, LLC	Country
WCMG	94.3 FM	Latta	Cumulus Licensing LLC	Urban adult contemporary
WCOO	105.5 FM	Kiawah Island	L.M. Communications II of South Carolina, Inc.	Adult album alternative
WCOS	1400 AM	Columbia	iHM Licenses, LLC	Sports (FSR)
WCOS-FM	97.5 FM	Columbia	iHM Licenses, LLC	Country
WCRE	1420 AM	Cheraw	Pee Dee Broadcasting, LLC	Classic hits
WCRS	1450 AM	Greenwood	Anne's Entertainment Vision, Inc.	News/Talk
WCSZ	1070 AM	Sans Souci	Redemptive Strategies Broadcasting, LLC	Spanish Top 40
WCZZ	1090 AM	Greenwood	Broomfield Broadcasting, Inc.	Urban adult contemporary
WDAI	98.5 FM	Pawleys Island	Cumulus Licensing LLC	Mainstream urban
WDAR-FM	105.5 FM	Darlington	iHM Licenses, LLC	Mainstream urban
WDEK	1170 AM	Lexington	The Meeting Place Church of Greater Columbia	Gospel
WDLL	90.5 FM	Dillon	American Family Association	Religious talk (AFR)
WDOG-FM	93.5 FM	Allendale	Good Radio Broadcasting, Inc.	Country
WDSC	800 AM	Dillon	iHM Licenses, LLC	Sports (FSR)
WDXY	1240 AM	Sumter	Community Broadcasters, LLC	News/Talk
WEAF	1130 AM	Camden	Jeff Andrulonis	Urban contemporary gospel
WEBK	91.1 FM	Society Hill	Richburg Educational Broadcasters, Inc.	Oldies
WEGX	92.9 FM	Dillon	iHM Licenses, LLC	Country
WEHF-LP	99.9 FM	Bennettsville	Bennettsville Community Radio	Southern gospel
WELP	1360 AM	Easley	Upstate Radio, Inc.	Christian
WEPR	90.1 FM	Greenville	South Carolina Educational TV Commission	Classical/news/talk
WESC	660 AM	Greenville	iHM Licenses, LLC	Classic country
WESC-FM	92.5 FM	Greenville	iHM Licenses, LLC	Classic country
WEZL	103.5 FM	Charleston	iHM Licenses, LLC	Country
WEZV	105.9 FM	North Myrtle Beach	Byrne Acquisition Group MB, LLC	Adult contemporary
WFBC-FM	93.7 FM	Greenville	Audacy License, LLC	Top 40 (CHR)
WFBS-LP	107.9 FM	Salem	Salem Radio Inc	Oldies
WFCH	88.5 FM	Charleston	Family Stations, Inc.	Religious (Family Radio)
WFGN	1180 AM	Gaffney	Hope Broadcasting, Inc.	Religious
WFMV	620 AM	Cayce	Glory Communications, Inc.	Urban contemporary gospel
WFOC-LP	93.3 FM	Florence	Columbus Club of Florence, South Carolina	Catholic
WFOX	102.3 FM	St. Andrews	L&L Licensee, LLC	Classic rock
WFOX-LP	104.3 FM	Sandy Springs	Spreading Cheer	Classic Hits/Variety
WFRK	95.3 FM	Quinby	Community Broadcasters, LLC	Talk
WFSC-LP	106.9 FM	Florence	City of Florence	Tourism Info
WFXH-FM	106.1 FM	Hilton Head Island	Dick Broadcasting Company, Inc. of Tennessee	Active rock
WGCD	1490 AM	Chester	Wisdom, LLC	Urban adult contemporary
WGEO-LP	105.7 FM	Georgetown	City of Georgetown (Georgetown City Fire Department)	Tourism Info
WGFG	105.3 FM	Branchville	Community Broadcasters, LLC	Country
WGFJ	94.1 FM	Cross Hill	Radio Training Network, Inc.	Christian radio (HIS Radio)
WGLD-FM	93.9 FM	Conway	Maryland Media One, LLC	Classic alternative
WGOG	101.7 FM	Walhalla	Appalachian Broadcasting Company, Inc.	Country
WGSP-FM	102.3 FM	Pageland	Norsan Media Group of South Carolina, LLC	Spanish tropical
WGTN	1400 AM	Georgetown	Waccamaw Broadcasting, LLC	Southern rock/outlaw country/blues
WGTR	107.9 FM	Buckport	iHM Licenses, LLC	Country
WGVL	1440 AM	Greenville	iHM Licenses, LLC	Black-oriented news
WGWY-LP	107.7 FM	Greenville	Monsignor Andrew K. Gwynn, Inc	Variety
WGYT-LP	92.1 FM	Greer	Tyger River Radio	Oldies
WHBJ	99.1 FM	Barnwell	Augusta Radio Fellowship Institute, Inc.	Christian (Good News Network)
WHGS	1270 AM	Hampton	Bocock Communications, LLC	Silent
WHHD	98.3 FM	Clearwater	Beasley Media Group, LLC	Top 40 (CHR)
WHHW	1130 AM	Hilton Head Island	Dick Broadcasting Company, Inc. of Tennessee	Regional Mexican
WHMC-FM	90.1 FM	Conway	South Carolina Educational TV Commission	Public radio; news/talk
WHQA	103.1 FM	Honea Path	The Power Foundation	Southern gospel
WHQB	90.5 FM	Gray Court	The Power Foundation	Southern gospel
WHRT-FM	91.9 FM	Cokesbury	Radio Training Network, Inc.	Christian classic hits (Classic HIS Radio)
WHRZ-LP	104.1 FM	Spartanburg	First Baptist Church	Christian Top 40 (His Radio Z)
WHXT	103.9 FM	Orangeburg	L&L Licensee, LLC	Mainstream urban
WHZK-LP	97.7 FM	Greenwood	South Carolina Mass Choir, Inc.	Spanish
WHZT	98.1 FM	Williamston	SM-WHZT, LLC	Rhythmic contemporary
WIAR-LP	100.5 FM	Hilton Head Island	Island Christian Radio, Inc.	Christian
WIBZ	95.5 FM	Wedgefield	Community Broadcasters, LLC	Adult hits
WIIZ	97.9 FM	Blackville	Nicwild Communications, Inc.	Mainstream urban
WIWF	96.9 FM	Charleston	Radio License Holding CBC, LLC	Classic hits
WJAY	1280 AM	Mullins	Door of Hope Christian Church, Inc.	Urban contemporary gospel
WJBS	1440 AM	Holly Hill	Harry J. Govan	Gospel
WJMX	1400 AM	Darlington	iHM Licenses, LLC	News/Talk
WJMX-FM	103.3 FM	Cheraw	iHM Licenses, LLC	Top 40 (CHR)
WJMZ-FM	107.3 FM	Anderson	SM-WJMZ, LLC	Urban adult contemporary
WJNA	96.7 FM	Westminster	Augusta Radio Fellowship Institute, Inc.	Country
WJNI	106.3 FM	Ladson	Kirkman Broadcasting Inc.	Urban contemporary gospel
WJTB-FM	95.3 FM	South Congaree	Augusta Radio Fellowship Institute, Inc.	Christian
WJWJ-FM	89.9 FM	Beaufort	South Carolina Educational TV Commission	Public radio; news/talk
WKCL	91.5 FM	Ladson	Chapel Holy Spirit Church & Bible College	Religious
WKDK	1240 AM	Newberry	Newberry Broadcasting Company, Inc.	Oldies
WKER-FM	91.1 FM	McCormick	Saint Paul Radio, Inc.	
WKSP	96.3 FM	Aiken	iHM Licenses, LLC	Urban adult contemporary
WKVC	88.9 FM	North Myrtle Beach	Educational Media Foundation	Contemporary Christian (K-Love)
WKVG	94.5 FM	Greenville	Educational Media Foundation	Contemporary Christian (K-Love)
WKWQ-LP	100.7 FM	Beaufort	South Carolina LowCountry Gullah People's Movement	R&B Oldies
WKXC-FM	99.5 FM	Aiken	Beasley Media Group, LLC	Country
WKZK	1600 AM	North Augusta	Gospel Radio, Inc.	Gospel
WKZQ-FM	96.1 FM	Forestbrook	Dick Broadcasting Company, Inc. of Tennessee	Alternative rock
WLBG	860 AM	Laurens	Southeastern Broadcast Associates, Inc.	Variety
WLFF	106.5 FM	Georgetown	Cumulus Licensing LLC	Classic country
WLFJ-FM	89.3 FM	Greenville	Radio Training Network, Inc.	Christian radio (HIS Radio)
WLFW	92.7 FM	Johnston	The Power Foundation	Southern gospel
WLGI	90.9 FM	Hemingway	Regional Baha'i Council of the Southeastern States	Variety
WLHH	104.9 FM	Ridgeland	Saga South Communications, LLC	Classic hits
WLJI	98.3 FM	Summerton	Community Broadcasters, LLC	Urban contemporary gospel
WLJK	89.1 FM	Aiken	South Carolina Educational TV Commission	Public radio; news/talk
WLPG	91.7 FM	Florence	Augusta Radio Fellowship Institute, Inc.	Christian
WLRE-LP	96.5 FM	Elloree	Elloree Educational Association	Classic country
WLSQ	1240 AM	Loris	Banana Jack Murphy Productions, LLC	Conservative talk
WLTE	95.5 FM	Powdersville	Educational Media Foundation	Contemporary worship (Air1)
WLTQ	730 AM	Charleston	Mediatrix SC, Inc.	Catholic
WLTR	91.3 FM	Columbia	South Carolina Educational TV Commission	Classical/news/talk
WLTS	103.3 FM	Greer	Educational Media Foundation	Contemporary worship (Air1)
WLTY	96.7 FM	Cayce	iHM Licenses, LLC	Adult hits
WLVH	101.1 FM	Hardeeville	iHM Licenses, LLC	Urban adult contemporary
WLXC	103.1 FM	Columbia	Radio License Holding CBC, LLC	Urban adult contemporary
WLXM-LP	107.9 FM	Lexington	Calvary Chapel of Lexington	Contemporary Christian
WMBJ	88.3 FM	Murrells Inlet	Radio Training Network, Inc.	Christian radio (HIS Radio)
WMGL	107.3 FM	Ravenel	Radio License Holding CBC, LLC	Urban adult contemporary
WMHK	89.7 FM	Columbia	Educational Media Foundation	Contemporary Christian (K-Love)
WMIR	1200 AM	Atlantic Beach	Colonial Media and Entertainment, LLC	Urban contemporary gospel
WMSZ-LP	95.9 FM	Hartsville	Lighthouse Gospel Network	Easy listening
WMXG	99.3 FM	Chester	Radio One of North Carolina, LLC	Christian
WMXP-LP	95.5 FM	Greenville	Malcolm X Grassroots Movement	Variety
WMXT	102.1 FM	Pamplico	Cumulus Licensing LLC	Classic rock
WMXZ	95.9 FM	Isle of Palms	Saga South Communications, LLC	Top 40 (CHR)
WMYB	92.1 FM	Myrtle Beach	Dick Broadcasting Company, Inc. of Tennessee	Top 40 (CHR)
WNBK	90.9 FM	Whitmire	Richburg Educational Broadcasters, Inc.	Oldies
WNFO	1430 AM	Sun City Hilton Head	Walter M. Czura	Spanish variety
WNGR-LP	95.5 FM	Tigerville	North Greenville College	Christian
WNIR-LP	95.5 FM	Newberry	Newberry College	Variety
WNKT	107.5 FM	Eastover	Radio License Holding CBC, LLC	Sports (ISN/FSR)
WNMB	900 AM	North Myrtle Beach	Gorilla Broadcasting Company, LLC	Regional Mexican
WNOK	104.7 FM	Columbia	iHM Licenses, LLC	Top 40 (CHR)
WNRR	1380 AM	North Augusta	Eternity Records, LLC	Urban contemporary gospel
WNSC-FM	88.9 FM	Rock Hill	South Carolina Educational TV Commission	Public radio; news/talk
WOBS-LP	106.1 FM	Orangeburg	South Carolina State University	Variety
WOCS-LP	93.7 FM	Orangeburg	New Perspectives Media Assoc.	Urban adult contemporary
WOEZ	93.7 FM	Burton	Saga South Communications, LLC	Soft adult contemporary
WOHM-LP	96.3 FM	Charleston	Media Reform SC	Variety
WOLH	1230 AM	Florence	Community Broadcasters, LLC	Sports (ESPN)
WOLI	910 AM	Spartanburg	Norsan Media LLC	Regional Mexican
WOMG	98.5 FM	Lexington	Radio License Holding CBC, LLC	Classic hits
WOPA-LP	102.7 FM	Clio	Clio Opera Inc.	Variety
WORD	950 AM	Spartanburg	Audacy License, LLC	Sports (ISN/BetQL)
WORG	100.3 FM	Elloree	Educational Media Foundation	Contemporary Christian (K-Love)
WOSF	105.3 FM	Gaffney	Gaffney Broadcasting, LLC	Urban adult contemporary
WPCC	1410 AM	Clinton	Large Time Radio Network LLC	Rhythmic oldies, beach music
WPCI	1490 AM	Greenville	Paper Cutters, Inc.	Variety
WPCX-LP	97.1 FM	Clinton	Presbyterian College	Adult alternative
WPDT	105.1 FM	Coward	Community Broadcasters, LLC	Urban contemporary gospel
WPGI	93.7 FM	Georgetown	GT Radio, LLC	Country
WPIF	1470 AM	Georgetown	Waccamaw Broadcasting, LLC	Oldies/beach music
WPJF	1260 AM	Greenville	Iglesia Vida y Esperanza de Greenville, South Carolina	Spanish Christian
WPJK	1580 AM	Orangeburg	South Carolina State University	Sports (ESPN)
WPJM	800 AM	Greer	Full Gospel WPJM 800 AM Radio, Inc.	Gospel
WPLS-LP	95.9 FM	Greenville	Furman University	Adult alternative
WPOG	710 AM	St. Matthews	Grace Baptist Church of Orangeburg	Christian
WPUB-FM	102.7 FM	Camden	Kershaw Radio Corporation	Oldies
WQAT-LP	99.5 FM	Belton	Allen Temple Ame Church	Urban contemporary gospel
WQKI-FM	95.7 FM	Orangeburg	Community Broadcasters, LLC	Classic hip hop
WWFN-FM	100.1 FM	Lake City	Cumulus Licensing LLC	Sports
WQSC	1340 AM	Charleston	Kirkman Broadcasting, Inc.	Classic country
WQUL	1510 AM	Woodruff	New Mountains to Climb, LLC	Classic hits
WQXL	1470 AM	Columbia	Glory Communications, Inc.	Talk
WRBK	90.3 FM	Richburg	Richburg Educational Broadcasters, Inc.	Oldies
WRFE	89.3 FM	Chesterfield	Positive Alternative Radio, Inc.	Southern gospel
WRFJ	91.5 FM	Fort Mill	Radio Training Network, Inc.	Contemporary worship (HIS Radio Praise)
WRFQ	104.5 FM	Mount Pleasant	iHM Licenses, LLC	Classic rock
WRHI	1340 AM	Rock Hill	Our Three Sons Broadcasting, LLP	News/Talk, live sportscasts
WRHJ-LP	93.1 FM	Rock Hill	Southside Baptist Church	Conservative Christian
WRHM	107.1 FM	Lancaster	Our Three Sons Broadcasting, LLP	Country
WRIX	1020 AM	Homeland Park	The Power Foundation	Bluegrass
WRJA-FM	88.1 FM	Sumter	South Carolina Educational TV Commission	Public radio; news/talk
WRNN-FM	99.5 FM	Socastee	Dick Broadcasting Company, Inc. of Tennessee	News/Talk
WROO	104.9 FM	Mauldin	iHM Licenses, LLC	Sports (FSR)
WROP-LP	92.7 FM	Columbia	St. Peter's Catholic School	Catholic
WROQ	101.1 FM	Anderson	Audacy License, LLC	Country
WRQP-LP	97.5 FM	Bennettsville	Marlboro County Broadcasters	Variety
WRTH-LP	101.5 FM	Greenville	Quality Radio Partners, Inc.	Top 40 (CHR)
WRWN	107.9 FM	Port Royal	Dick Broadcasting Company, Inc. of Tennessee	Classic hits
WRXZ	107.1 FM	Briarcliff Acres	iHM Licenses, LLC	Mainstream rock
WRZE	94.1 FM	Kingstree	iHM Licenses, LLC	Classic rock
WSBF-FM	88.1 FM	Clemson	Clemson University Board of Trustees	Educational
WSCC-FM	94.3 FM	Goose Creek	iHM Licenses, LLC	News/Talk
WSCI	89.3 FM	Charleston	South Carolina Educational TV Commission	Classical/news/talk
WSCZ	93.9 FM	Winnsboro	Alpha Media Licensee LLC	Mainstream urban
WSEA	100.3 FM	Atlantic Beach	Cumulus Licensing LLC	Sports (ISN)
WSEJ-LP	96.7 FM	Spartanburg	St. Paul the Apostle Catholic School	Catholic
WSHP-FM	103.9 FM	Easley	Radio Training Network, Inc.	Contemporary worship music (HIS Radio Praise)
WSIM	93.7 FM	Lamar	Community Broadcasters, LLC	Adult hits
WSNW	1150 AM	Seneca	Blue Ridge Broadcasting Corporation	Adult contemporary
WSPA-FM	106.3 FM	Simpsonville	Audacy License, LLC	Regional Mexican
WSPG	1400 AM	Spartanburg	Fox Sports Spartanburg 2 LLC	Sports (FSR)
WSPO	1390 AM	Charleston	Saga South Communications, LLC	Tourist information
WSPX	94.5 FM	Bowman	Community Broadcasters, LLC	Urban contemporary gospel
WSSB-FM	90.3 FM	Orangeburg	South Carolina State University	Jazz
WSSC	1340 AM	Sumter	Sumter Baptist Temple, Inc.	Conservative Christian
WSSL-FM	100.5 FM	Gray Court	iHM Licenses, LLC	Country
WSSX-FM	95.1 FM	Charleston	Radio License Holding CBC, LLC	Top 40 (CHR)
WSYN	103.1 FM	Surfside Beach	Cumulus Licensing LLC	Classic hits
WTBI-FM	91.5 FM	Greenville	Tabernacle Baptist Bible College	Southern gospel and religious
WTCB	106.7 FM	Orangeburg	Radio License Holding CBC, LLC	Adult contemporary
WTKN	94.5 FM	Murrells Inlet	Byrne Acquisition Group MB, LLC	Conservative talk
WTMA	1250 AM	Charleston	Radio License Holding CBC, LLC	News/Talk
WTMZ	910 AM	Dorchester Terrace–Brentwood	Kirkman Broadcasting, Inc.	Sports (ISN/FSR)
WTMZ-FM	98.9 FM	McClellanville	Kirkman Broadcasting, Inc.	Sports (ESPN)
WTPJ-LP	102.3 FM	York	Temple Presbyterian Church in America	Religious Teaching
WTQS	1490 AM	Cameron	Community Broadcasters, LLC	Talk
WTUA	106.1 FM	St. Stephen	Praise Communications, Inc.	Urban contemporary gospel
WUBB	106.9 FM	Bluffton	Dick Broadcasting Company, Inc. of Tennessee	Country
WUBK	88.1 FM	Enoree	Richburg Educational Broadcasters, Inc.	
WUCC	99.9 FM	Williston	Conquering with Christ, LLC	
WUDE	94.3 FM	Forest Acres	Midlands Media Group LLC	Classic country
WULR	980 AM	York	Iglesia Nueva Vida of High Point	Contemporary Christian
WUSC-FM	90.5 FM	Columbia	The University of South Carolina	Freeform
WVCD	790 AM	Bamberg–Denmark	Voorhees College	Christian
WVCO	94.9 FM	Loris	Carolina Beach Music Broadcasting Corp.	Oldies/beach music
WVGB	1490 AM	Beaufort	Mount Carmel Baptist Church	Gospel
WVOC	560 AM	Columbia	iHM Licenses, LLC	News/Talk
WVOY-LP	98.9 FM	Jefferson	The Church of God, Inc. Emmanuel	Religious Teaching
WVSC	103.1 FM	Port Royal	Saga South Communications, LLC	Adult hits
WVSZ	107.3 FM	Chesterfield	Our Three Sons Broadcasting, LLP	Country
WWBD	94.7 FM	Sumter	Community Broadcasters, LLC	Classic rock
WWDM	101.3 FM	Sumter	L&L Licensee, LLC	Urban adult contemporary
WQPD (FM)	100.5 FM	Marion	Cumulus Licensing LLC	Sports
WWHK	1450 AM	Myrtle Beach	Dick Broadcasting Company, Inc. of Tennessee	Classic country
WWHM	1290 AM	Sumter	Community Broadcasters, LLC	Urban oldies
WWKT-FM	99.3 FM	Kingstree	Community Broadcasters, LLC	Country
WWOK-LP	95.3 FM	Greenville	Missionary Broadcasters Inc.	Easy listening
WWOS	810 AM	Walterboro	Grace Baptist Church of Orangeburg	Christian talk
WWOS-FM	91.9 FM	St. George	Grace Baptist Church of Orangeburg	Christian
WWRK	970 AM	Florence	iHM Licenses, LLC	Classic rock
WWWZ	93.3 FM	Summerville	Radio License Holding CBC, LLC	Mainstream urban
WWXM	97.7 FM	Garden City	iHM Licenses, LLC	Top 40 (CHR)
WXBT	100.1 FM	West Columbia	iHM Licenses, LLC	Mainstream urban
WXLY	102.5 FM	North Charleston	iHM Licenses, LLC	Adult contemporary
WXMB-LP	101.5 FM	Myrtle Beach	Calvary Chapel of Myrtle Beach	Religious Teaching
WXNE-LP	98.1 FM	Pontiac	Friends of Independent Public Radio Northeast Ltd	Variety
WXNW-LP	99.1 FM	Seven Oaks	Friends of Independent Public Radio Northwest	Variety
WXPS-LP	92.1 FM	Spartanburg	Truth Chapel World Evangelism Fellowship Church	Gospel
WXRU-LP	107.9 FM	Piedmont	Lost Souls Youth Development Corporation	Urban oldies
WXRY-LP	99.3 FM	Columbia	Alumni Broadcasters, LLC	Adult alternative
WXST	99.7 FM	Hollywood	Saga South Communications, LLC	Urban adult contemporary
WYAV	104.1 FM	Myrtle Beach	Dick Broadcasting Company, Inc. of Tennessee	Classic rock
WYBB	98.1 FM	Folly Beach	L.M. Communications of South Carolina, Inc.	Mainstream rock
WYCJ-LP	104.5 FM	Simpsonville	The Church in Simpsonville	Religious Teaching
WYEJ-LP	106.7 FM	Anderson	Anderson Family Radio	Christian
WYEZ	100.7 FM	Andrews	Byrne Acquisition Group MB, LLC	Adult contemporary
WYFG	91.1 FM	Gaffney	Bible Broadcasting Network, Inc.	Conservative religious (BBN)
WYFH	90.7 FM	North Charleston	Bible Broadcasting Network, Inc.	Conservative religious (BBN)
WYFV	88.5 FM	Cayce	Bible Broadcasting Network, Inc.	Conservative religious (BBN)
WYKZ	98.7 FM	Beaufort	iHM Licenses, LLC	Adult contemporary
WYLA-LP	97.5 FM	Charleston	The Charleston County Public Library	Variety
WYMB	920 AM	Manning	Cumulus Licensing LLC	Hot adult contemporary
WYNN	540 AM	Florence	Cumulus Licensing LLC	Urban contemporary gospel
WYNN-FM	106.3 FM	Florence	Cumulus Licensing LLC	Mainstream urban
WYRD	1330 AM	Greenville	Audacy License, LLC	Sports (ISN/BetQL)
WYRD-FM	98.9 FM	Spartanburg	Audacy License, LLC	News/Talk
WYRF-LP	92.5 FM	Florence	Radio Free Communications, Inc.	Christian pop/rock
WYTX-LP	98.5 FM	Rock Hill	York Technical College	Variety
WZJO-LP	90.9 FM	Columbia	St. Joseph Catholic School	Catholic
WZJY	1480 AM	Mount Pleasant	Norsan Communications and Management, Inc.	Spanish tropical
WZLA-FM	92.9 FM	Abbeville	Ronald Shelley Reid	Classic country
WZLC	88.9 FM	Summerville	Radio Training Network, Inc.	Christian radio (HIS Radio)
WZMJ	93.1 FM	Batesburg	Midlands Media Group, LLC	Classic hits
WZSN	103.5 FM	Greenwood	Broomfield Broadcasting, Inc.	Adult contemporary
WZTF	102.9 FM	Scranton	iHM Licenses, LLC	Urban adult contemporary
WZVZ-LP	97.3 FM	Six Mile	Battle of Central SC Committee	Variety
WZZQ	1500 AM	Gaffney	Fowler Broadcast Communications Inc.	Adult hits

== Defunct ==
- WAGL
- WAGS
- WANS
- WBAW (AM)
- WBAW-FM
- WBSC
- WCSE (AM)
- WDAB
- WDKD
- WDOG
- WFIS (AM)
- WGUS-FM
- WHSC
- WHYM
- WISW
- WJDJ
- WJES
- WKMG
- WKSC
- WLCM
- WLMA
- WNMI-LP
- WPCO
- WPJS
- WQNT
- WSCM-LP
- WWPZ-LP
- WYLA-LP
- WYLI-LP
- WZKQ-LP

== See also ==
- South Carolina media
  - List of newspapers in South Carolina
  - List of television stations in South Carolina
  - Media of locales in South Carolina: Charleston, Columbia, Greenville

== Bibliography ==
- Jack Alicoate, ed. (1939), "South Carolina", Radio Annual, New York: Radio Daily, OCLC 2459636 – via Internet Archive
- "AM Stations in the U.S.: South Carolina", Radio Annual Television Year Book, New York: Radio Television Daily, 1963, OCLC 10512375 – via Internet Archive

== Images ==
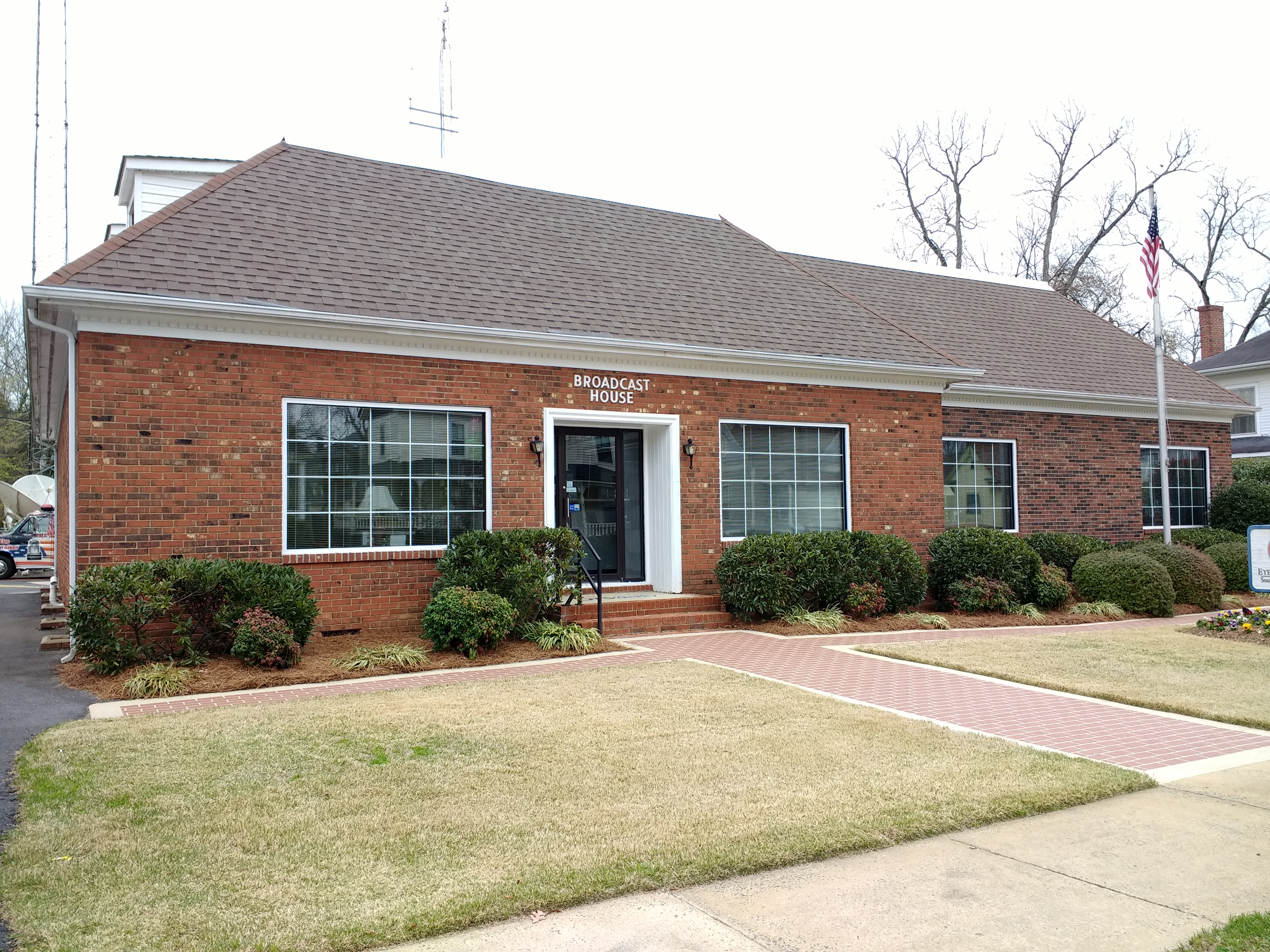
WRHI radio, Rock Hill, South Carolina, 2017
