= WYMB =

Former simulcast of WQPD Lake City
- Manning, South Carolina; United States
- Frequency: 920 kHz
- Branding: Q100.1

Programming
- Format: Hot adult contemporary
- Affiliations: Westwood One

Ownership
- Owner: Cumulus Media; (Cumulus Licensing LLC)
- Sister stations: WBZF; WCMG; WMXT; WQPD; WWFN-FM; WYNN; WYNN-FM

History
- First air date: July 15, 1957
- Last air date: March 7, 2025

Technical information
- Licensing authority: FCC
- Facility ID: 11652
- Class: B
- Power: 2,300 watts day; 1,000 watts night
- Transmitter coordinates: 33°41′24.6″N 80°16′22.3″W

Links
- Public license information: Public file; LMS
- Webcast: Listen live
- Website: www.q1001.com

WYMB (920 AM) was a radio station licensed to serve Manning, South Carolina, United States. The station was owned by Cumulus Media. It formerly simulcast a hot adult contemporary format with WQPD in Lake City, South Carolina.

== History ==
On August 28, 2023, WYMB's format changed from classic country to hot adult contemporary, branded as "Q100.1".

WYMB went silent in March 2025. It was one of 6 Cumulus stations to close the weekend of March 7, as part of a larger shutdown of underperforming Cumulus stations. In March 2026, WYMB turned in its license to the Federal Communications Commission. It was cancelled on March 9, 2026.
