= WJMX =

WJMX may refer to:

- WJMX (AM), a radio station (1400 AM) licensed to serve Darlington, South Carolina, United States
- WJMX-FM, a radio station (103.3 FM) licensed to Cheraw, South Carolina
- WWRK, a radio station (970 AM) licensed to Florence, South Carolina, which held the call sign WJMX from 1947 to 2013
