= 800 AM =

AM radio frequency

The following radio stations broadcast on AM frequency 800 kHz: 800 AM is a Mexican clear-channel frequency; XEROK Ciudad Juárez, is the dominant station on 800 AM. See also List of broadcast station classes.

== In Argentina ==
- LT43 in Charata, Chaco
- LU15 in Viedma, Río Negro
- LV23 in General Alvear, Mendoza
- Wajzugun in San Martín de los Andes, Neuquén

== In Brazil ==
- Rádio MEC in Rio de Janeiro, Rio de Janeiro and Brasília, Federal District

== In Canada ==
Call sign	City of license	Daytime power (kW)	Nighttime power (kW)	Transmitter coordinates
CHAB	Moose Jaw, Saskatchewan	10	10	50.377222°N 105.393056°W
CJAD	Montreal, Quebec	50	10	45.2472°N 73.5231°W
CJBQ	Belleville, Ontario	10	10	43.968889°N 77.419167°W
CKLW	Windsor, Ontario	50	50	42.0569°N 83.0028°W
CKOR	Penticton, British Columbia	10	0.5	49.423611°N 119.571944°W
VOWR	St. John's, Newfoundland and Labrador	10	2.5	47.5719°N 52.7528°W

== In Caribbean Netherlands ==
- PJB3 in Kralendijk, Bonaire

== In El Salvador ==
- YSAX in San Salvador, El Salvador

== In Mexico ==
Stations in bold are clear-channel stations.

- XEAN-AM in Ocotlán, Jalisco
- XEERG-AM in Ojo de Agua, Nuevo León
- XEQT-AM in Veracruz, Veracruz
- **XEROK-AM** in Ciudad Juárez, Chihuahua - 50 kW, transmitter located at 31.695556°N 106.383611°W
- XESPN-AM in Tijuana, Baja California
- XEZV-AM in Tlapa de Comonfort, Guerrero

== In the United States ==
Call sign	City of license	Facility ID	Class	Daytime power (kW)	Nighttime power (kW)	Transmitter coordinates
KAGH	Crossett, Arkansas	2937	D	0.24		33.134722°N 91.946944°W
KBFP	Bakersfield, California	28846	B	1	0.44	35.345556°N 118.9925°W
KBRV	Soda Springs, Idaho	17437	D	10	0.15	42.644167°N 111.611389°W
KDDD	Dumas, Texas	74312	D	0.25	0.008	35.861667°N 101.930556°W
KDWC	Luverne, Minnesota	39259	D	0.5	0.08	43.650278°N 96.171944°W
KINY	Juneau, Alaska	823	B	10	7.6	58.301389°N 134.440556°W
KPDQ	Portland, Oregon	58628	B	1	0.5	45.4775°N 122.750278°W
KQCV	Oklahoma City, Oklahoma	6487	B	2.5	1	35.4125°N 97.673889°W
KREI	Farmington, Missouri	35531	D	1	0.15	37.792222°N 90.41°W
KVOM	Morrilton, Arkansas	43830	D	0.25	0.04	35.157778°N 92.767778°W
KXIC	Iowa City, Iowa	29075	D	1	0.199	41.6875°N 91.544167°W
WCHA	Chambersburg, Pennsylvania	10110	D	1	0.196	39.928056°N 77.695556°W
WDEH	Sweetwater, Tennessee	39377	B	1	0.379	35.613611°N 84.459167°W
WDSC	Dillon, South Carolina	16935	B	1	0.38	34.368889°N 79.404722°W
WHOS	Decatur, Alabama	44023	D	1	0.215	34.598611°N 87.006667°W
WJAT	Swainsboro, Georgia	54809	B	1	0.5	32.581944°N 82.356111°W
WKBC	North Wilkesboro, North Carolina	72457	B	1	0.308	36.187778°N 81.141667°W
WKZI	Casey, Illinois	73711	B	0.25	0.25	39.304444°N 87.971389°W
WLAD	Danbury, Connecticut	65456	B	1	0.286	41.374167°N 73.446389°W
WMGY	Montgomery, Alabama	73260	D	1	0.143	32.413333°N 86.290278°W
WNNW	Lawrence, Massachusetts	14752	B	3	0.244	42.673889°N 71.190556°W
WPCA	Waupaca, Wisconsin	36245	B	5	0.5	44.354167°N 89.058056°W
WPEL	Montrose, Pennsylvania	43658	D	1	0.135	41.854444°N 75.863889°W
WPJM	Greer, South Carolina	2319	B	1	0.438	34.949722°N 82.245278°W
WPLK	Palatka, Florida	54721	B	1	0.334	29.651944°N 81.592222°W
WSHO	New Orleans, Louisiana	9235	B	1	0.233	29.845°N 90.110833°W
WSVS	Crewe, Virginia	320	B	10	0.27	37.195278°N 78.166944°W
WTMR	Camden, New Jersey	24658	B	5	0.5	39.909167°N 75.1°W
WVAL	Sauk Rapids, Minnesota	78914	B	2.6	0.85	45.605°N 94.139167°W
WVHU	Huntington, West Virginia	505	D	5	0.185	38.393056°N 82.473333°W
