= WWFN =

WWFN may refer to:

- WWFN-FM, a radio station (100.5 FM) licensed to serve Marion, South Carolina, United States
- WQPD (FM), a radio station (100.1 FM) licensed to serve Lake City, South Carolina, which held the call signs WWFN or WWFN-FM from 1990 to 2023
