= WQPD =

WQPD may refer to:

- WQPD (FM), a radio station (100.5 FM) licensed to serve Marion, South Carolina
- WWFN-FM, a radio station (100.1 FM) licensed to serve Lake City, South Carolina, United States, which held the call sign WQPD from 2023 to 2026
- WLKF, a radio station (1430 AM) licensed to serve Lakeland, Florida, United States, which held the call sign WQPD from 1971 to the early 1980s
