= WTBI =

WTBI may refer to:

- WTBI-FM, a radio station (91.5 FM) licensed to serve Greenville, South Carolina, United States
- WBPB, a radio station (1540 AM) licensed to serve Pickens, South Carolina, which held the call sign WTBI from 1984 to 2022
