= WDOG =

WDOG may refer to:

- WDOG-FM, a radio station (93.5 FM) licensed to serve Allendale, South Carolina, United States
- WDOG (AM), a defunct radio station (1460 AM) formerly licensed to serve Barnwell, South Carolina
