= WNBK =

WNBK may refer to:

- WNBK (FM), a radio station (90.9 FM) licensed to Whitmire, South Carolina, United States
- WKYC, a television station (channel 3) licensed to Cleveland, Ohio, United States, which formerly held the call sign WNBK
