= 1090 AM =

Clear-channel frequency

The following radio stations broadcast on AM frequency 1090 kHz: 1090 AM is a United States and Mexican clear-channel frequency. WBAL Baltimore and XEPRS-AM Rosarito-Tijuana share Class A status on 1090 AM. KAAY in Little Rock, Arkansas, is a former class A station on this frequency but was reduced to class B when it downgraded its nighttime power in 2026.

== In Argentina ==
- Libertad in Rosario, Santa Fe

== In Canada ==
- CBON-12 in Mattawa, Ontario - 40 watts, transmitter located at 46.3136°N 78.7214°W

== In Mexico ==
Stations in bold are clear-channel stations.

- XEAU-AM in Monterrey, Nuevo León
- XEFC-AM in Mérida, Yucatán
- XEHR-AM in Puebla, Puebla
- **XEPRS-AM** in Rosarito, Baja California - 50 kW daytime, 50 kW nighttime, transmitter located at 32.402278°N 117.086722°W
- XEWL-AM in Nuevo Laredo, Tamaulipas

== In the United States ==
Stations in bold are clear-channel stations.

Call sign	City of license	Facility ID	Class	Daytime power (kW)	Nighttime power (kW)	Critical hours power (kW)	Transmitter coordinates
KAAY	Little Rock, Arkansas	33253	B	50	3.4		34.6°N 92.225°W
KBOZ	Bozeman, Montana	16775	B	5	5		45.616111°N 111.087778°W
KEXS	Excelsior Springs, Missouri	14620	D	10		4	39.294167°N 94.260278°W
KMXA	Aurora, Colorado	10057	B	50	0.5		39.664722°N 104.656667°W
KNWS	Waterloo, Iowa	49784	D	1	0.057		42.443889°N 92.299444°W
KPTR	Seattle, Washington	6387	B	50	50		47.393889°N 122.423611°W
KSOU	Sioux Center, Iowa	67756	D	0.5			43.056111°N 96.171389°W
KTGO	Tioga, North Dakota	67183	D	1.1	0.006		48.391111°N 102.934444°W
KVOP	Plainview, Texas	54681	B	5	0.5		34.092222°N 101.640556°W
WAQE	Rice Lake, Wisconsin	55338	D	5			45.537778°N 91.763889°W
WBAF	Barnesville, Georgia	3973	D	1			33.053611°N 84.135278°W
**WBAL**	Baltimore, Maryland	65679	A	50	50		39.375833°N 76.7725°W
WCAR	Livonia, Michigan	73397	B	0.25	0.5		42.329444°N 83.361944°W
WCRA	Effingham, Illinois	19047	D	0.64	0.011		39.107222°N 88.562222°W
WCZZ	Greenwood, South Carolina	68856	D	5		2.25	34.162778°N 82.194722°W
WENR	Englewood, Tennessee	39379	D	1			35.426389°N 84.515833°W
WFCV	Fort Wayne, Indiana	6489	D	2.5		1	41.083611°N 85.075556°W
WHGG	Kingsport, Tennessee	64508	D	10		1.8	36.461111°N 82.453333°W
WILD	Boston, Massachusetts	47413	D	4.8		1.9	42.402778°N 71.074444°W
WKBZ	Muskegon, Michigan	25087	D	1			43.276667°N 86.253889°W
WKFI	Wilmington, Ohio	58371	D	1			39.436667°N 83.855833°W
WKTE	King, North Carolina	6427	D	1			36.296667°N 80.371667°W
WSOL	San German, Puerto Rico	58832	B	0.25	0.73		18.078889°N 67.021667°W
WTNK	Hartsville, Tennessee	5862	D	1	0.002		36.388056°N 86.165278°W
WTSB	Selma, North Carolina	71088	D	9		1.7	35.615833°N 78.409167°W
WWGC	Albertville, Alabama	6211	D	0.5			34.264444°N 86.278889°W

== In Uruguay ==
- CX 28 Radio Imparcial in Montevideo
