= WFIS =

WFIS may refer to

- World Federation of Independent Scouts
- WFIS (AM), a defunct radio station (1600 AM) formerly licensed to Fountain Inn, South Carolina, United States
- Washington Federation of Independent Schools
