= Kevin Peterson (disambiguation) =

Kevin Peterson may refer to:

- Kevin Peterson (born 1994), American football player
- Kevin Peterson, character in Abandoned (film)
- Kevin Peterson, presenter on WFIS (AM)

== See also ==
- Kevin Pietersen (born 1980), England international cricketer
- Kevin Petersen (disambiguation)
