= WDSC =

WDSC may refer to:

- WDSC (AM), a radio station (800 AM) licensed to Dillon, South Carolina, United States
- WDSC-TV, a television station (channel 24, virtual 15) licensed to New Smyrna Beach, Florida, United States
- Wadi Degla SC, a sports club based in Cairo, Egypt
