= WKMG =

WKMG may refer to:

- WKMG-TV, a television station (channel 26/virtual channel 6) licensed to serve Orlando, Florida, United States
- WKMG-LD, a low-power television station (channel 21, virtual 6) licensed to serve Ocala, Florida
- WKMG (AM), a defunct radio station (1520 AM) formerly licensed to serve Newberry, South Carolina, United States
