= WLMA =

WLMA may refer to:

- WFXO (AM), a radio station (1050 AM) licensed to serve Alexander City, Alabama, United States, which held the call sign WLMA from 2016 to 2019
- WLMA (South Carolina), a defunct radio station (1350 AM) formerly licensed to serve Greenwood, South Carolina, United States
- WLMA (TV), a religious television station (channel 4, virtual 44) licensed to serve Lima, Ohio, United States
