= WKSC =

WKSC may refer to:

- WKSC-FM, a contemporary hit radio station (103.5 FM) licensed to serve Chicago, Illinois, United States
- WKSC (AM), a defunct radio station (1300 AM) formerly licensed to serve Kershaw, South Carolina, United States
