= WBSC (disambiguation) =

The WBSC, or World Baseball Softball Confederation, is the world governing body for baseball, softball, and Baseball5.

WBSC may also refer to:

- World Buddhist Sangha Council, a Buddhist ecumenical organization
- WBSC (AM), a defunct radio station (1550 AM) formerly licensed to serve Bennettsville, South Carolina, United States
- WBSC-LP, a low-power radio station (102.3 FM) licensed to serve Bamberg, South Carolina, United States
- WMYA-TV, a television station (channel 35, virtual 40) licensed to Anderson, South Carolina, United States, which used the call sign WBSC-TV from September 1999 to June 2006

== See also ==
- West Bengal State Council of Technical and Vocational Education and Skill Development (WBSCTVESD) (India)
