= WYLA-LP =

Radio station in Charleston, South Carolina (2016–2018)

- Charleston, South Carolina; United States
- Broadcast area: Charleston metropolitan area
- Frequency: 97.5 MHz
- Branding: Local Radio for the Lowcountry

Programming
- Format: Community radio

Ownership
- Owner: Charleston County Public Library

History
- First air date: March 1, 2016
- Last air date: May 18, 2018

Technical information
- Licensing authority: FCC
- Facility ID: 193140
- ERP: 100 watts
- HAAT: 28.56 m (93.7 ft)
- Transmitter coordinates: 32°47′18.3″N 79°55′52.6″W

Links
- Public license information: LMS

WYLA-LP was a LPFM radio station licensed to Charleston, South Carolina, with a local music and arts format. The station operated on FM 97.5 MHz under the ownership of the Charleston County Public Library.

WYLA-LP aired 24 hours daily, concentrating on locally oriented music, poetry, and spoken word programming. Evening programming included community-generated shows such as Electronic Escape, The Vinyl Vault, Rebel Souls Road Show, World Wide Saturday Night, Cruising Down Doo-Wop Lane, The Night Owl, Celtic Waves, The Swing Shift, Vintage Country, Prophetic Voices of the Lowcountry, The 80's Alternative Flashback, and Image-Free Radio.

WYLA-LP broadcast with 100 non-directional watts of power. The station's studio was located in the Main Branch of the Charleston County Public Library at 68 Calhoun St., Charleston, SC 29401.

The station was accessible via the library's website and YouTube.

== History ==
WYLA-LP was granted a construction permit on November 6, 2014. The station began its broadcasting activities on March 1, 2016, and was granted a license to cover on March 21, 2016.

The station manager was Kevin Crothers.

In May 2018, the Charleston County Public Library announced it would discontinue the radio station. In a Charleston City Paper article, a spokesperson for the library cited the need to shift the "library's strategic mission". According to the paper, the library's press release stated that WYLA-LP did not serve in "fostering the flow of information and education" although statements attributed to local listeners refuted the library's position. Online user comments argued that the station aligned with the library's published Mission Statement and Vision.

WYLA-LP last aired on May 18, 2018. In April 2019, the Library agreed to transfer the silent station's license to the Lowcountry Alliance For Media And Art. The Library later rescinded this decision and allowed the license to expire, depriving the community of an artistically-valuable resource.

== Reception ==
WYLA-LP received a "Critics Pick" in the Charleston City Paper Best of Charleston 2016 and "Best of Charleston 2017" awards.

The station was nominated in the "Best Cover Story" category of the Charleston City Paper Best of 2017 awards for the story WYLA 97.5 Finds its Focus in Charlestons Legit Music Scene.

The station was noted for in the press for offering "exciting new ways for the library to serve the public" and for its "dedication to Charleston music".
