= WBAW-FM =

Radio station in Georgia, United States (1966–2016)

- Barnwell, South Carolina; United States
- Frequency: 99.1 MHz

Programming
- Format: Defunct

Ownership
- Owner: Bullie Broadcasting Corporation

History
- First air date: August 31, 1966
- Last air date: April 25, 2016
- Former frequencies: 101.7 MHz
- Call sign meaning: "Barnwell"; see WBAW (AM)

Technical information
- Licensing authority: FCC
- Facility ID: 54879
- Class: C3
- ERP: 25,000 watts
- HAAT: 100 meters
- Transmitter coordinates: 32°7′15″N 81°47′56″W

Links
- Public license information: Public file; LMS

WBAW-FM (99.1 FM) was a radio station which most recently broadcast a gospel music format as "Praise 99.1". Licensed to Barnwell, South Carolina, United States, the station was owned by Bullie Broadcasting Corporation.

WBAW-FM was established in 1966. It was acquired by its final owners in 1998; a move to Pembroke, Georgia, on 99.3 MHz was approved in the early 2000s but never occurred, and after the death of the principal owner of Bullie Broadcasting, the station entered into financial difficulties and closed in 2016.

== History ==
WBAW-FM went on the air August 31, 1966, on 101.7 MHz; it was co-owned with WBAW (740 AM), the daytime-only station in Barnwell, and simulcast some of its programs. During the 1980s, the station had urban contemporary music on nights and weekends; the DJ, Henry Louis Wallace, was later convicted for ten murders in Charlotte, North Carolina.

The 3,000-watt outlet was approved in 1991 to upgrade to 25,000 watts on 99.1 MHz. In 1993, Joe Wilder sold the 79 percent of Radio WBAW, Inc., that he owned to his son H. Drew Wilder, who already owned the remainder; at the time, WBAW-AM-FM broadcast an adult contemporary format. The WBAW stations were split in 1998: the AM station went to Jacor and ultimately closed in 2000, while the FM, then bearing a news/talk format, was sold for $475,000 to Bullie Broadcasting Corporation, owned by Gary Dodd.

Beginning in 2000, Dodd spearheaded an attempt to move the station from Barnwell to Pembroke, Georgia, on 99.3 MHz. From this facility, it would rimshot Savannah. After WBAW AM (then known as WBUB) closed, the Federal Communications Commission, however, imposed a condition in 2001 that required that a new radio station licensed to Barnwell be on air before WBAW-FM was allowed to test in Pembroke. The relicensing of WDOG to Barnwell in 2006 lifted this block, but progress was slow to nonexistent. The proposed tower site in Claxton was near a property that the Georgia State Historic Preservation Office deemed eligible for inclusion on the National Register of Historic Places; because no other feasible site was available, the parties reached a memorandum of understanding stipulating that Bullie could not build the tower needed until the historic site was documented and an environmental assessment concluded.

Beginning in 2012, the station was silent for long stretches of time, often operating at low power, while the Pembroke site was built. However, construction was impaired and eventually stalled out for financial reasons after Gary Dodd, the owner of Bullie, died in 2013 after a battle with skin cancer. The lengthy project ended up costing WBAW-FM its ability to broadcast from Barnwell altogether; the allotment had been given to a new station, WHBJ, and the FCC wished to prevent warehousing of spectrum.

After not broadcasting since April 25, 2016, the station's license was canceled on September 27, 2017. In 2021, the Pembroke allotment was included in FCC Auction 109 and won by Nelson Rodríguez for $400,000.
