= Charleston Library Society =

Subscription library in South Carolina, US

Coordinates: 32°46′42″N 79°55′58″W

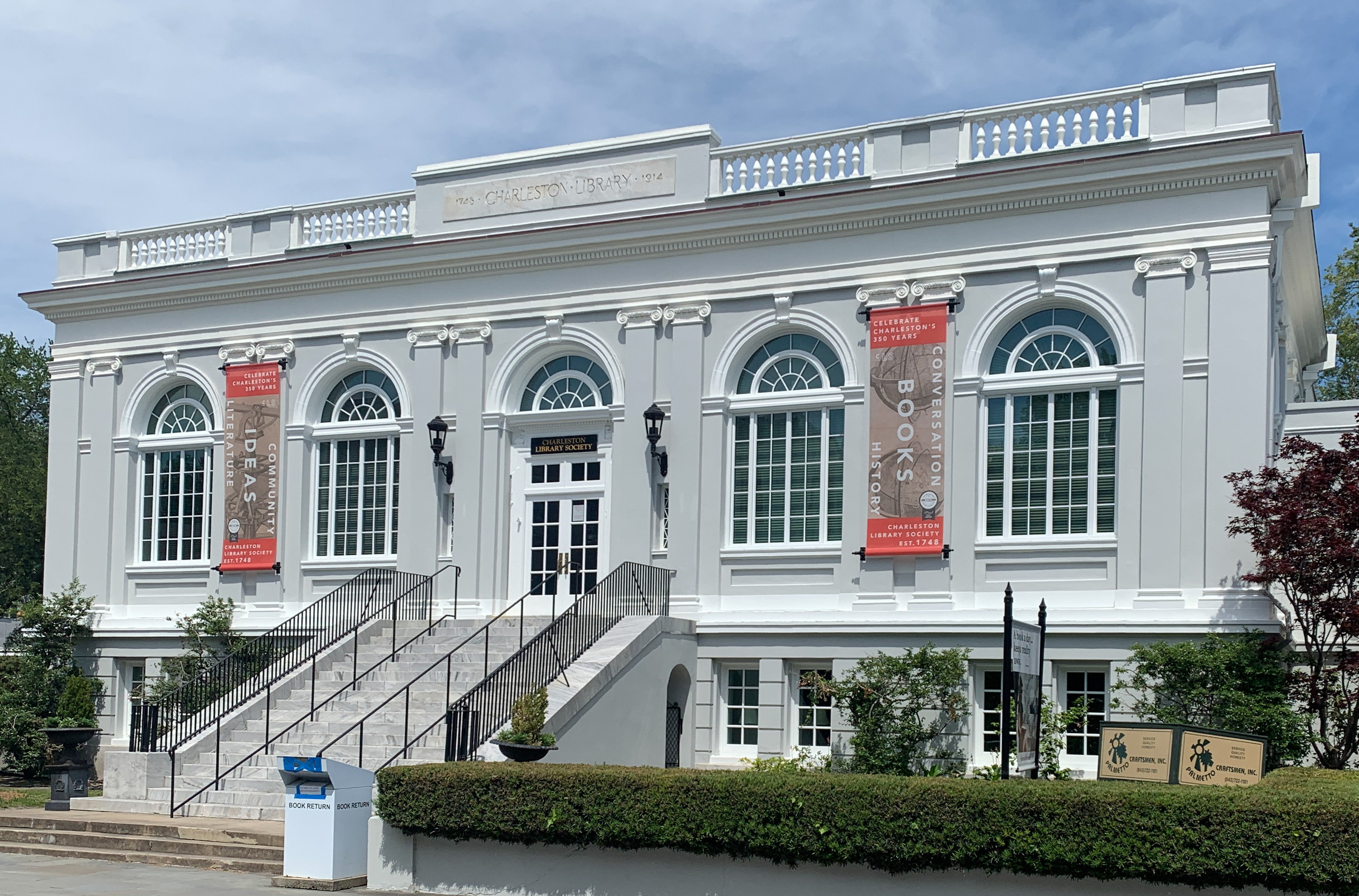
- Location: Charleston, SC
- Established: 1748

Other information
- Website: https://charlestonlibrarysociety.org/

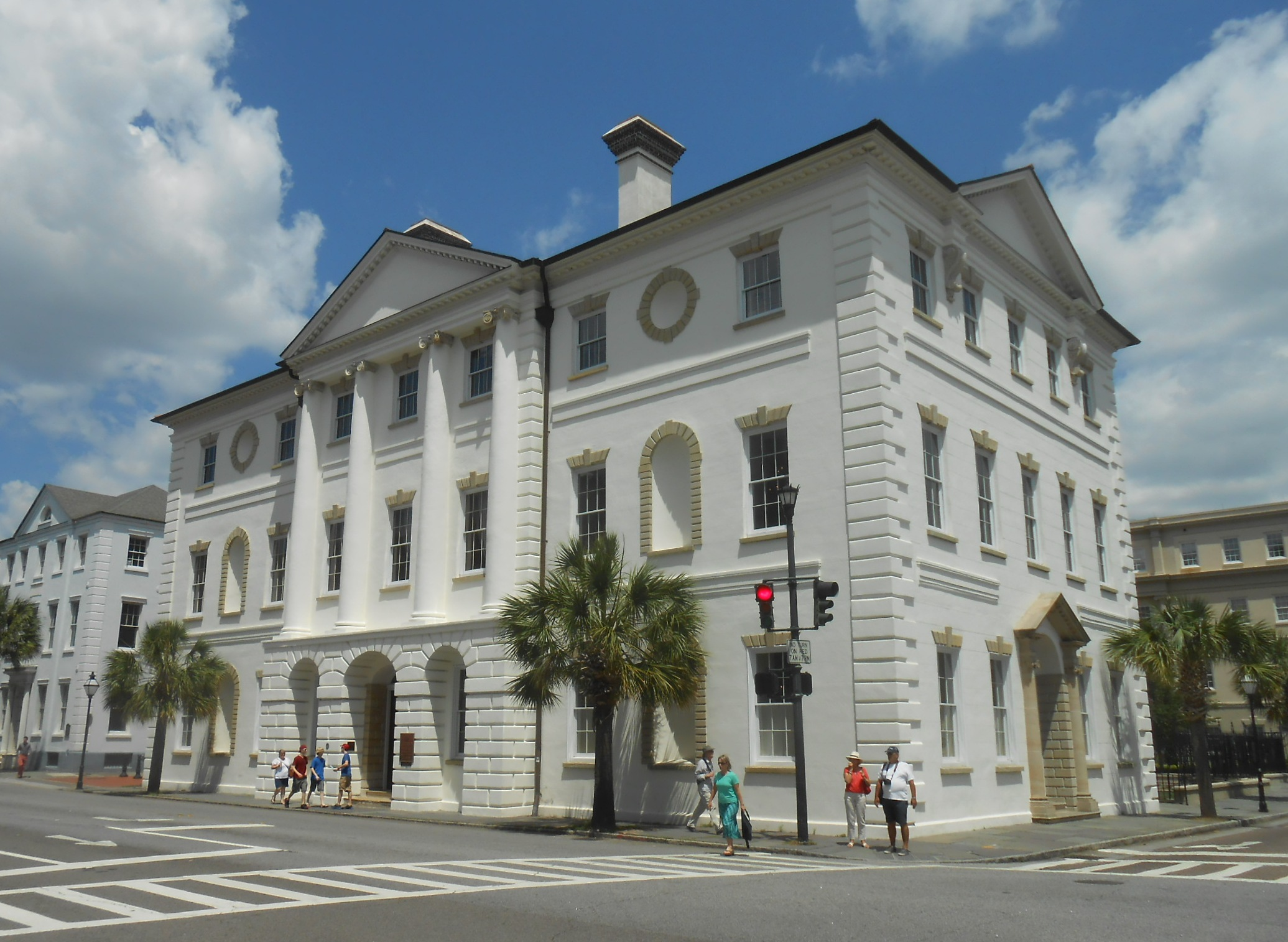
The Library Society's first permanent address, which it occupied from 1792 to 1835, was within what is now the Charleston County Courthouse at 82 Broad St.

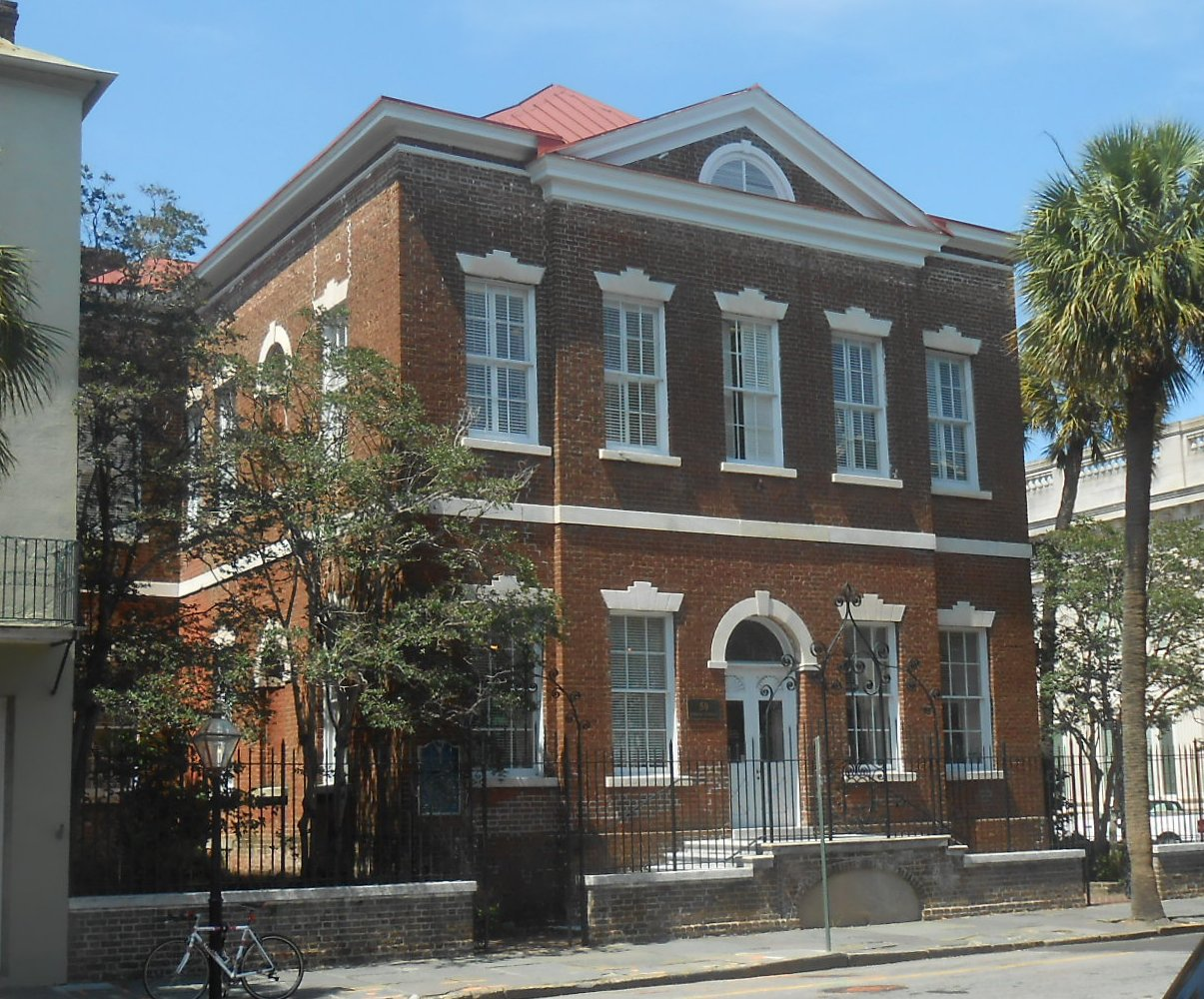
The Library Society was located at 50 Broad St. from 1835 to 1914.

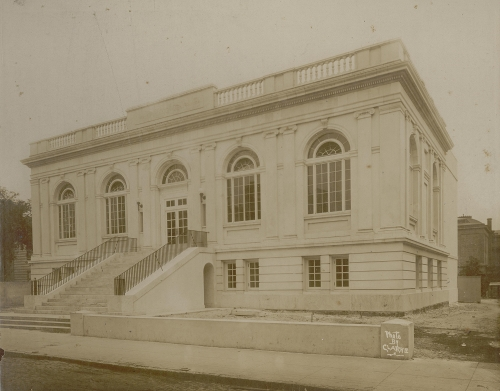
The Library Society has been located at 164 King St. since 1914.

Charleston Library Society, founded in 1748, is a subscription library in Charleston, South Carolina.

The library is the third oldest subscription library in the United States after the Library Company of Philadelphia (founded 1731 by Benjamin Franklin) and the Redwood Library and Athenaeum of Newport, Rhode Island (1747). The Charleston Library was founded before The Providence Athenaeum (1753), the New York Society Library (1754), and the Boston Athenaeum (1807).

Anne Cleveland served as the Executive Director of the Charleston Library Society from 2009 to 2023. Laura Pelzer has been the Executive Director since January 2023.

== History ==
On June 13, 1748 a group of seventeen men from Charleston organized to begin purchasing current periodicals from England. The founders were Alexander Baron; Samuel Brailsford; Robert Brisbane; William Burrows; John Cooper; Paul Douxsaint; James Grindlay; William Logan; Alexander McCauley; Patrick McKie; Thomas Middleton; John Neufville Jr.; Thomas Sacheverel; John Sinclair; Paul Stevenson; Peter Timothy; Joseph Wragg Jr.; and Samuel Wragg Jr. The men each contributed ten pounds sterling to the enterprise. The mission expanded quickly, and by December 1748, the group had decided to acquire books as well.

The group attempted to secure a charter for their organization, and twice such a measure was adopted by the Colonial Assembly. Both times, however, the Governor refused to sign the bill. Aid from the Royal government in London was refused, and the Society stopped its activities temporarily. Eventually, though, in 1754, after having added other members, they acquired a charter under the name the Charles Town Library Society. Governor Glen signed the bill, and the Crown ratified it in 1755. It was founded as a white-only society.

In 1759, the Society began investigating the possibility of creating an educational institution in connection with its mission. Starting in 1759, the Society laid aside money each year to establish such an institution. The Society accumulated about 20,000 pounds sterling by 1778.

Meanwhile, the size of the library's holding expanded quickly, but a fire destroyed all but about 185 volumes of the 5,000 or 6,000 in the collection on January 15, 1778; the library recovered, though, and held 20,000 volumes by 1860.

In 1874, the Apprentices' Library Society was merged with the Charleston Library Society.

Members voluntarily paid (and still pay) a small subscription to the library to purchase books which all members may share. Most of the early books needed to be purchased from England because the American printing industry was only in its infancy in the 18th century. The Library Society played a crucial role in the founding of the College of Charleston in 1770 and the Charleston Museum in 1773.

== Location ==
The Charleston Library Society's collection has been held in many locations. Originally, elected librarians safeguarded the Library's materials in their homes until 1792, when the collection was transferred to the upper floor of the Statehouse (today, the Charleston County Courthouse). From 1835 until 1914, the Charleston Library Society occupied a building at the corner of Church and Broad Streets (50 Broad St.) that was purchased with the aid of "brick" memberships, several of which are still in use generations later by Charleston families. During the Civil War, however, the bulk of the collection was removed to the South Carolina College (today the University of South Carolina) for safekeeping. The small portion of the collection kept in Charleston was destroyed.

By 1910, the Society recognized that its present location was inadequate. The building was too small to house the growing collection. In addition, the building was not fireproof and was located very close to its neighbors to the west and north. The Society received a gift from James Murdoch of seed money to begin a fund for the construction of a new building, and the search for a new location began. Several locations were considered including a place on Washington Square (but it was decided the City would not offer a portion of the park) and a place on Meeting St. between Broad and Market Streets (but the lots were too expensive). The leading option appeared to be purchasing the lot at 59 Meeting St., the site of the Branford-Horry House. The Society would then divide the lot and sell the portion with the house and build a new facility on the remainder. Another site on King St., however, was the popular choice of the membership, and $14,020 was raised for the use of that location. The King St. location was chosen at a special meeting of the Society held on May 13, 1910.

In 1914, the Society moved to its current location at 164 King St. The building was designed in the Beaux Arts style by Philadelphia architects McGoodwin and Hawley. In 1963 the Library Society bought the adjacent Barnwell Annex at 162 King Street. Then, in 1992, the Library Society purchased the Carolina Rifles Armory (c. 1888) at 158-160 King St., restored the building over several years, and renamed it the Ripley-Ravenel Building. Only the facade of the Carolina Rifles Armory had survived Hurricane Hugo, so the Library Society retained that but built a fireproof storage building behind it for its rarest and most valuable collections.

== Bindery & Archival Lab ==
The Dorothy the Bookbinder's Bindery and Archival Lab was christened in December of 2011. From the summer of '12 to '16, past Director Brien Beidler oversaw repair and conservation of the Library's priceless collection. He directed courses and workshops on the art of the book and traditional binding methods.

Today, conservation and bookbinding efforts are led by Director of Conservation, James Davis. James studied Art History at the College of Charleston, where his passion and interest in art and historical objects grew into a career dedicated to their repair and maintenance. His background includes a Master's degree in the Conservation of Books and Library Materials from West Dean College in the UK, and he is an active member of the American Institute for Conservation and the Guild of Bookworkers.

The space also serves as the Jerrold and Ann Mitchell Conservation Lab, a working reminder of the dedication that the Charleston Library Society maintains towards the proper care and repair of their historical treasures. From here, staff utilize the most up-to-date techniques to stabilize the rarest volumes from the collection so they can be enjoyed by members, researchers, and visitors alike.

== See also ==
- Charleston County Public Library
