= WKTE =

Coordinates: 36°17′48″N 80°22′18″W

- King, North Carolina; United States
- Frequency: 1090 kHz
- Branding: 1090 The Wave

Programming
- Format: Oldies, Beach music, Classic Country, Rhythm & Blues
- Affiliations: "On The Beach with Charlie Brown"

Ownership
- Owner: Booth-Newsom Broadcasting

History
- First air date: December 1963

Technical information
- Licensing authority: FCC
- Facility ID: 6427
- Class: D
- Power: 1,000 watts daytime only

Links
- Public license information: Public file; LMS
- Website: wkte1090.com

WKTE (1090 AM) is a radio station broadcasting a variety format consisting of Oldies, Beach music, Classic Country, and Rhythm & Blues. Licensed to King, North Carolina, US, it serves the Winston-Salem area. The station is currently owned by Booth-Newsom Broadcasting. WKTE broadcasts during the daytime only; 1090 AM is a United States and Mexico clear-channel frequency.
