= Carolina Rifles Armory =

Coordinates: 32.778162°N 79.932830°W

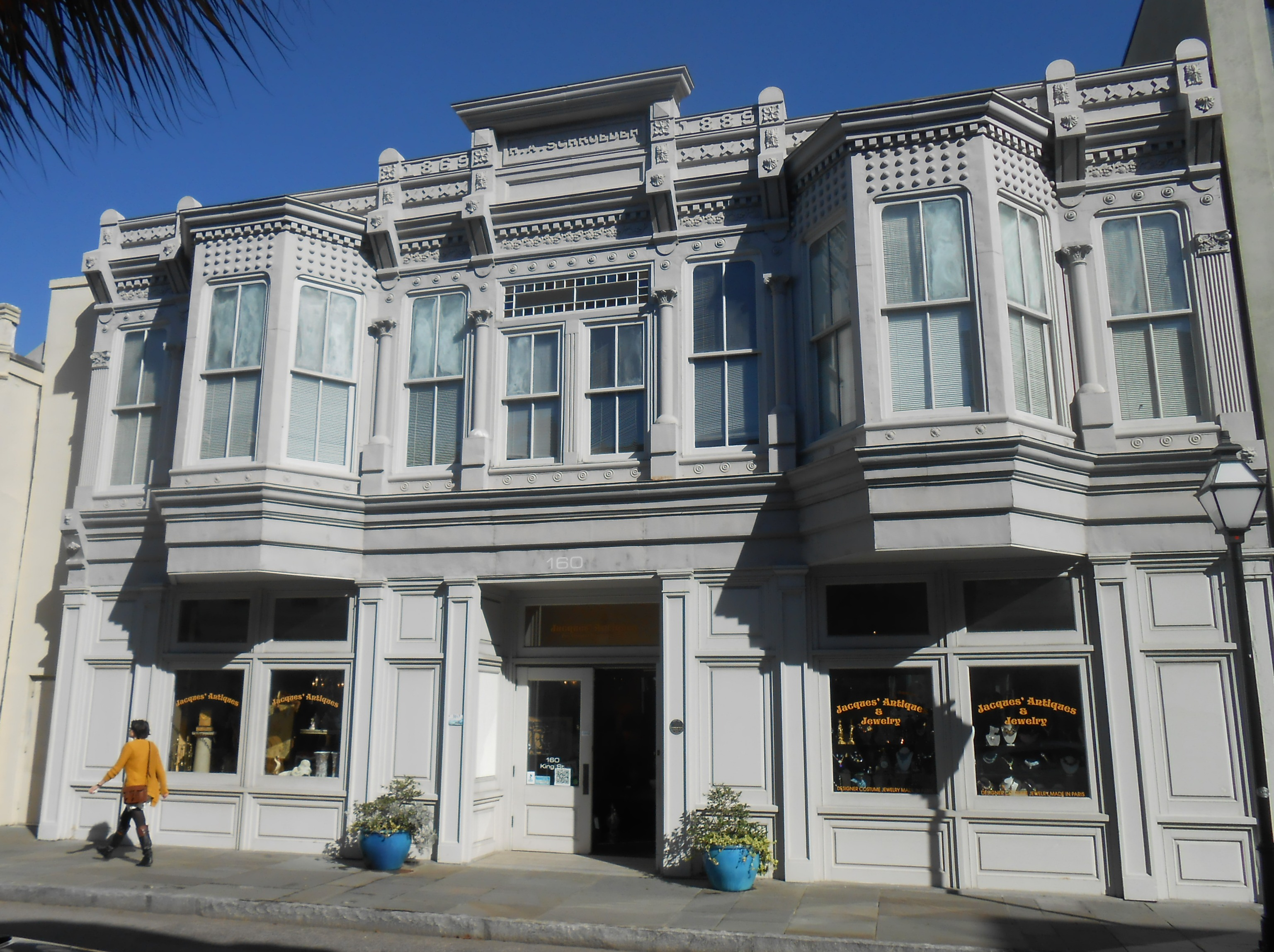
The Carolina Rifles Armory at 158-160 King St., Charleston, South Carolina

The Carolina Rifles Armory at 158-160 King St., Charleston, South Carolina, was a late 19th-century headquarters for a semi-private military group, but today only the façade remains, facing an annex for the Charleston Library Society.

The Carolina Rifles were a semi-private military group organized in 1869 during Reconstruction when armed military units were banned. The group ostensibly served social functions but was also expected by Confederate veterans to serve extra-police purposes. After the election of Gov. Wade Hampton, the organizations became legal, and the group reconstituted itself as the Carolina Rifles. They purchased 158-160 King St. as their armory in 1888. Construction was under way in 1889, and the Carolina Rifles were in their new headquarters by 1890. The building had commercial space on the ground floor, and the Carolina Rifles used the second floor. By 1989, when Hurricane Hugo came ashore, the building was in poor shape, and all but its intricate façade was destroyed in the storm. The neighboring Charleston Library Society bought the building so that it could expand, and a reconstruction of a building behind the façade began in November 1994.
