= WBAW (AM) =

Radio station in Barnwell, South Carolina, United States (1953–2000)

- Barnwell, South Carolina; United States
- Frequency: 740 kHz

Ownership
- Owner: Clear Channel Communications; (Citicasters Licenses, Inc.)

History
- First air date: October 12, 1953
- Last air date: May 2000
- Former call signs: WBAW (1953–1999); WMXG (1999); WBUB (1999–2000)

Technical information
- Facility ID: 54880
- Class: D
- Power: 1,000 watts
- Transmitter coordinates: 33°13′26.4″N 81°21′36″W

WBAW, last using the call sign WBUB, was a radio station on 740 AM licensed to Barnwell, South Carolina, United States. It was last owned by Clear Channel Communications. The studios and transmitter were located on US 278 on the southern edge of Barnwell.

== History ==
On October 15, 1952, the Federal Communications Commission (FCC) granted a construction permit for a new daytime-only radio station on 740 kHz to serve Barnwell to Blue Ridge Broadcasting Company, Inc. Broadcasts began less than a year later, on October 12, 1953. Six months after signing on, WBAW earned one of the highest distinctions in station history when it received a Peabody Award for its public service programming, particularly its Church of Your Choice series.

In 1956, the 500-watt station was sold to Radio WBAW, Inc. The new owners, who spent $45,000, were Virginia and J. A. Gallimore and Joseph B. Wilder. After power was raised to 1,000 watts in 1960, the Wilders bought out the Gallimores three years later. Wilder would serve as president of the South Carolina Broadcasters Association, being inducted into its hall of fame in 1988; additionally, he spent six years as state aeronautics commissioner and then was elected to the South Carolina House of Representatives, representing a district including Barnwell and nearby Allendale. August 1966 brought the addition of WBAW-FM 99.1, which initially was a partial simulcaster of the AM station's programming.

In 1993, Joe Wilder sold the 79 percent of Radio WBAW, Inc., that he owned to his son H. Drew Wilder, who already owned the remainder; at the time, WBAW-AM-FM broadcast an adult contemporary format. The WBAW stations were split in 1998: the AM station went to Jacor, which paid $117,000 for the facility, now with a religious format.

In two years under Jacor ownership, the station changed call signs two times in four months, becoming WMXG on January 8, 1999, and WBUB on April 30 of that year. The WBUB call sign had previously been parked on 730 AM in Charleston after having been used at 107.5 MHz there. However, the 740 station would not last much longer; it went silent in May 2000.
