= XHAN-FM =

Radio station in Ocotlán, Jalisco, Mexico

- Ocotlán, Jalisco; Mexico
- Frequency: 91.1 MHz
- Branding: 91.1 FM

Programming
- Format: Regional Mexican

Ownership
- Owner: Grupo Radiorama; (Radio XEAN-AM, S.A. de C.V.)

History
- First air date: April 22, 1950 (concession)
- Call sign meaning: OcotlÁN

Technical information
- Licensing authority: CRT
- Class: B1
- ERP: 6 kW
- HAAT: 307.7 m (1,010 ft)
- Transmitter coordinates: 20°21′53.5″N 102°50′02.4″W

Links
- Webcast: Listen live
- Website: laluperrona.com

XHAN-FM is a radio station in Ocotlán, Jalisco, Mexico. Transmitting at a frequency of 91.1 MHz on the FM band, it broadcasts daily with a schedule of popular music, regional mexican, and news. The station's offices are located at 215 Zaragoza in Ocotlán's historic downtown.

== History ==
Logo used with the La Ribereña format

XEAN-AM on 800 kHz received its concession on April 22, 1950. It was a daytimer with 1,000 watts owned by Radio Ocotlán, S.A. Nighttime broadcasts at 100 watts began in the 1990s. The current concessionaire was formed in 2006 and FM was added in 2011.
