= WEGX =

- Dillon, South Carolina; United States
- Broadcast area: Florence, South Carolina
- Frequency: 92.9 MHz
- Branding: Eagle 92.9

Programming
- Format: Country music
- Affiliations: Premiere Networks; Motor Racing Network

Ownership
- Owner: iHeartMedia; (iHM Licenses, LLC)
- Sister stations: WDAR-FM, WDSC, WJMX, WJMX-FM, WRZE, WWRK, WZTF

History
- First air date: February 16, 1954
- Former call signs: WDSC-FM (1954–1986); WZNS (1986–1994)
- Call sign meaning: Eagle

Technical information
- Licensing authority: FCC
- Facility ID: 16936
- Class: C
- ERP: 100,000 watts
- HAAT: 492.9 meters (1,617 ft)
- Transmitter coordinates: 34°22′4.00″N 79°19′21.00″W

Links
- Public license information: Public file; LMS
- Webcast: Listen live (via iHeartRadio)
- Website: eagle929online.iheart.com

WEGX (92.9 FM) is a commercial radio station licensed to Dillon, South Carolina, United States, and serving the Florence and Myrtle Beach areas. Owned by iHeartMedia, it carries a country music format branded as "Eagle 92.9". Its studios are in Florence, and the transmitter is located at WBTW's nearly 2000-foot tower in Dillon County northeast of Florence.

== History ==
former logo

For many years Eagle 92.9 had the call letters WDSC-FM. The format was adult contemporary in the 1980s when WDSC-FM became WZNS Z-92.9 and increased its signal power, already at 100,000 watts, by moving to one of the area's tallest towers, the one already used by WPDE-TV.

WZNS "Z93" played classic rock in the early 1990s. During the summer of 1993, WRCQ owner Metropolitan Broadcasting managed the station and aired the same programming on WZNS and WRCQ. In November, WZNS went off the air. Leading up to the switch in format, the station engaged in several stunts meant to attract attention, such as broadcasting the sound of chickens clucking, bouncing balls, barking dogs, running water, and a computerized countdown from 32,084. After the switch to country in 1994, billboards and newspaper ads advised people "Do not listen to 92.9 FM."

With Steve Norris and Dyan Sheridyn pairing up for mornings, the station began to find its audience. Despite that this was more concentrated in the surrounding Pee Dee region, Eagle 92.9 announced a move to studios in Fayetteville, North Carolina later that year. Owner Beasley Broadcasting also owned Fayetteville country station WKML.

Not surprisingly, the station did not do well in Fayetteville, and after 5 months, the station moved back to Dillon. On July 2, 1997, three years after buying the station, Beasley announced it would sell WEGX. Root Communications of Daytona Beach owned several stations in the Florence, South Carolina and Myrtle Beach, South Carolina markets, areas where Beasley had not succeeded in buying radio stations.

Qantum Communications Inc. purchased Florence's Root Communications Group LP stations in 2003.

With Qantum Communications once again concentrating their efforts on the Florence market and surrounding Pee Dee Region, the station quickly ascended to the top of the Arbitron rankings and has held its position consistently over the years, finishing second only to contemporary urban station WYNN 106.3. The station plays host to all MRN and PRN broadcasts as the official home for NASCAR in the region.

On May 15, 2014, Qantum Communications announced that it would sell its 29 stations, including WEGX, to Clear Channel Communications (now iHeartMedia), in a transaction connected to Clear Channel's sale of WALK AM-FM in Patchogue, New York to Connoisseur Media via Qantum. The transaction was consummated on September 9, 2014.
