= WJDJ =

Radio station in Hartsville, South Carolina (1972–2013)

- Hartsville, South Carolina; United States
- Frequency: 1490 kHz

Programming
- Format: Defunct (formerly country music)

Ownership
- Owner: Beaver Communications

History
- First air date: 1972; 54 years ago (as WSDC)
- Last air date: August 1, 2013; 13 years ago
- Former call signs: WSDC (1972–1989); WTNI (1989–2002)

Technical information
- Facility ID: 29300
- Class: C
- Power: 1,000 watts unlimited
- Transmitter coordinates: 34°21′47″N 80°4′28″W

WJDJ (1490 AM) was a radio station broadcasting a country music format. Formerly licensed to Hartsville, South Carolina, United States, the station was owned by Beaver Communications. Before being assigned to Hartsville, the callsign WJDJ was on a Top 40/CHR station in Somerset, Kentucky.

== History ==
The station went on the air as WSDC in 1972, changing to WTNI on January 25, 1989. On July 10, 2002, the station changed its call sign to WJDJ.

The station's license was returned to the Federal Communications Commission (FCC) by the licensee on August 1, 2013, and the FCC cancelled the license on August 8, 2013.
