= WJMX-FM =

Contemporary hit radio station in Cheraw–Florence, South Carolina

Coordinates: 34.505°N 79.905°W

- Cheraw, South Carolina; United States
- Broadcast area: Florence, South Carolina, and the Pee Dee Region
- Frequency: 103.3 MHz
- Branding: 103X

Programming
- Format: Top 40 (CHR)
- Affiliations: Premiere Networks

Ownership
- Owner: iHeartMedia; (iHM Licenses, LLC)
- Sister stations: WDAR-FM, WDSC, WEGX, WJMX-AM, WRZE, WWRK, WZTF

History
- First air date: July 17, 1979; 47 years ago (as WPDZ)
- Former call signs: WPDZ (1979–1988)
- Call sign meaning: WJM"X" (The X is used in the station's branding)

Technical information
- Licensing authority: FCC
- Facility ID: 3114
- Class: C2
- ERP: 50,000 watts
- HAAT: 150 meters (490 ft)

Links
- Public license information: Public file; LMS
- Webcast: Listen Live
- Website: 103xonline.iheart.com

WJMX-FM (103.3 MHz), also known as "103X", is an adult-leaning top 40 (CHR) station located in the Florence, South Carolina, radio market. The station is licensed by the Federal Communications Commission (FCC) to the town of Cheraw, South Carolina, and broadcasts with an effective radiated power (ERP) of 50 kW. Its studios are located in Florence, and its transmitter is located west of Society Hill, South Carolina. WJMX-FM is owned by iHeartMedia.

== History ==
103.1 signed on July 17, 1979, as WPDZ in Cheraw as the area's first FM Top 40 (CHR) station, "Z103". Although the station broadcast with 3 kW of power at the time, Z103 quickly became the top station in the area, even passing heritage Top 40 outlet WJMX AM 970 in the ratings (WJMX would add an FM signal on 106.3 in 1985). Eventually, WPDZ got a construction permit to increase its power to 50 kW, with a frequency change to 103.3, but the station went into bankruptcy by 1987 before it could be acted upon.

In early 1988, WJMX-FM purchased WPDZ and simulcasted with its 106.3 FM signal for most of the year, while upgrading the WPDZ signal to 50 kW (at 103.3 MHz). The move from 103.1 to 103.3 was to avoid interference with the station in Surfside Beach, SC also on 103.1, then WYAK (now WSYN), allowing both stations to increase power and coverage. In November of that year, WJMX spun off its 106.3 signal to Urban Contemporary outlet, WYNN-FM, while the 103.3 frequency became "103X", the CHR format (with more classic hits in the late 1980s).

In a deal announced in February 1997, Root Communications Ltd. announced plans to buy eight radio stations owned by Florence-based Atlantic Broadcasting, including WJMX-FM. Qantum Communications Inc. purchased Florence's Root Communications Group LP stations in 2003.

On May 15, 2014, Qantum Communications announced that it would sell its 29 stations, including WJMX-FM, to Clear Channel Communications (now iHeartMedia), in a transaction connected to Clear Channel's sale of WALK AM-FM in Patchogue, New York, to Connoisseur Media via Qantum. The transaction was consummated on September 9, 2014.
