= WDAR-FM =

- Darlington, South Carolina; United States
- Broadcast area: Florence, South Carolina
- Frequency: 105.5 MHz
- Branding: 105.5 The Beat

Programming
- Format: Mainstream urban

Ownership
- Owner: iHeartMedia, Inc.; (iHM Licenses, LLC)
- Sister stations: WDSC, WEGX, WJMX, WJMX-FM, WRZE, WWRK, WZTF

History
- First air date: March 1966; 59 years ago
- Former call signs: WDAR-FM (1966–1988); WMWG (1988–1990)
- Call sign meaning: Darlington

Technical information
- Licensing authority: FCC
- Facility ID: 3120
- Class: C3
- ERP: 17,000 watts
- HAAT: 122 meters (400 ft)
- Transmitter coordinates: 34°18′58.00″N 79°53′17.00″W

Links
- Public license information: Public file; LMS
- Webcast: Listen Live
- Website: thebeatflorence.iheart.com

WDAR-FM (105.5 FM), known as "105.5 The Beat", is a mainstream urban formatted radio station licensed to Darlington, South Carolina, and serving the Florence area. It is owned by iHeartMedia, Inc. Its studios are in Florence, and its transmitter is in Darlington.

== History ==
Prior to 1990, this station was adult contemporary/oldies. Then it was a classic rock station. It was also a country music radio station known as "Gator 105.5". For many years WDAR-FM played adult contemporary music as Sunny 105.5.

In a deal announced in February 1997, Root Communications Ltd. announced plans to buy eight radio stations owned by Florence-based Atlantic Broadcasting, including WDAR-FM. Qantum Communications Inc. purchased Florence's Root Communications Group LP stations in 2003.

The change to contemporary Christian took place in September 2013.

On May 15, 2014, Qantum Communications announced that it would sell its 29 stations, including WDAR-FM, to Clear Channel Communications (now iHeartMedia), in a transaction connected to Clear Channel's sale of WALK AM-FM in Patchogue, New York, to Connoisseur Media via Qantum. The transaction was consummated on September 9, 2014.

On August 21, 2017, WDAR-FM changed its format to mainstream urban, branded as "105.5 The Beat".
