= WLMA (South Carolina) =

- Greenwood, South Carolina; United States
- Frequency: 1350 kHz

Programming
- Language: English
- Format: News/talk

Ownership
- Owner: Ron Moore; (Morradio, Inc.)
- Sister stations: WCRS

History
- First air date: April 15, 1953; 72 years ago
- Last air date: March 28, 2012; 13 years ago
- Former call signs: WGSW (1953–1985, 1987–1992); WQXJ (1985–1987)

Technical information
- Facility ID: 72128
- Class: D
- Power: 1,000 watts daytime; 85 watts night
- Transmitter coordinates: 34°13′6″N 82°8′0″W

Links
- Website: wlma.net

WLMA (1350 AM) was a radio station located in Greenwood, South Carolina, United States, which broadcast from 1953 to 2012. It was last owned by Morradio, Inc., and ran a news/talk format. A series of legal and technical issues that had accumulated over a 15-year period led to the Federal Communications Commission ordering the station closed in March 2012.

== History ==
=== WGSW: Early years ===
Radio Greenwood, a group composed of investors from the state of Georgia, applied to the Federal Communications Commission (FCC) for a new radio station to serve Greenwood on October 5, 1951, with the FCC approving their application on September 3, 1952. From studios in the Edwards Arms apartment building, WGSW began broadcasting on April 15, 1953, as a 1,000-watt, daytime-only outlet with programming from the Mutual Broadcasting System. The station aired generally a format mixing pop and country music, with 20 percent of the station's air time being devoted to programs for Black listeners. It also maintained for a time a satellite studio in nearby Abbeville.

While Greenwood had two radio stations, in the late 1960s, an application was filed to build a third station in town by United Community Broadcasters. This led to another group filing a mutually exclusive proposal to use the same frequency in the nearby town of Saluda. The Saluda proposal was connected to WGSW, as one of the principals in that firm was WGSW's chief engineer. In 1971, the licenses of WGSW and WCRS were designated for hearing by the FCC. The commission's review board, in adjudicating the Saluda case, had found evidence that WGSW and WCRS had encouraged the Saluda proposal as a so-called "strike" application, one filed to block another application rather than for the purpose of building the specified facility. A year later, FCC chief hearing examiner Arthur A. Gladstone issued an initial decision in which he recommended that WCRS's license renewal be approved and WGSW's denied. He found that WGSW station manager George B. Cook Jr., had "seriously and substantially perjured himself" in the proceeding, recommending the FCC refer the matter to the United States Department of Justice. Per Gladstone, Cook had allegedly used the Saluda application without the principals' knowledge, determining "to capitalize on the situation" to discourage United. The FCC, however, overturned the examiner's decision and granted WGSW a renewal in February 1973, diverging from his conclusion that Cook had perjured himself in recalling conversations from several years prior and noted that WGSW itself had taken no overt action to impede the United proposal.

The launch of WMTY (1090 AM) prompted WGSW to switch to a full-time Top 40 format in 1972. In 1975, the studios moved from Edwards Arms to a new building at the transmitter site on Kateway in Greenwood.

=== Changes in the 1980s and silence ===
On February 1, 1985, WGSW switched from country music back to adult contemporary under new WQXJ call letters. Gilbert D. "Darroll" Evans, who became leader of the station with the call sign switch and who had been a newsman for WCRS, then bought the station for $170,000. WQXJ flipped to a gospel format in October 1986 but was taken out of commission by a June 1987 lightning strike. The station already owed money, and the insurance check for the lost transmitter went to its creditors. Radio Greenwood reassumed the license, changed the call letters back to WGSW, and sold the station to Alex Kinlaw, an attorney from Greenville, and local investor Charles Watt.

WGSW continued to broadcast a gospel format until the morning of May 6, 1991, when a lightning strike sparked a blaze that destroyed the station's studio facility and caused more than $125,000 in damage.

=== WLMA: Moore ownership and closure ===
In 1992, Ron Moore, through his company Morradio, filed to purchase WGSW from Kinlaw and Watt for $99,000 and requested a new call sign of WLMA; the other owner of Morradio was Ron's mother, Wilma Moore. The station went back on the air on October 11, 1992, from new offices in Greenwood, with a talk and sports format. Moore also unsuccessfully ran for the South Carolina state legislature in 1994.

Several years after Moore's purchase, WLMA began a long-running dispute with the FCC that would ultimately force the station's closure. On December 3, 1996, an agent of the Atlanta district office of the FCC's Enforcement Bureau inspected the station and determined that WLMA was transmitting from unauthorized facilities; while the station claimed it would correct this omission and file applications to use the site, it did not do so. In June 1997, the FCC determined that the license had expired on December 1, 1995, and that Morradio lacked authority to operate WLMA. Several forfeiture orders were issued, ordering Moore to pay fines, while the station continued to use the unauthorized site until 2012, doing so for more than 15 years.

In 2004, Moore again failed to file for renewal. On March 2, the FCC deleted the WLMA call sign and ordered the station off the air. Moore told the local Index-Journal newspaper that the paperwork had already been filed by that point, and the FCC granted special temporary authority to allow WLMA to continue broadcasting. One man objected to the proposed renewal, citing "poor engineering practices". Further, Moore was diagnosed with lung cancer and died on April 5, 2008, being remembered as the "Morning Mayor of the Lakelands". Days before, an application was filed to transfer the license to Jill Anne B. Eller, who assumed operational control the year before with her husband Jeff and also purchased WCRS as an insurance policy if the license for WLMA were to be canceled. The Ellers hoped to be able to clear the legal issues around WLMA.

On March 26, 2012, the FCC issued a letter affirming its finding that the station's license had expired in December 1997—a year after the 1996 finding of the use of unauthorized facilities, per Section 312(g) of the Telecommunications Act of 1996—and ordering it to cease operations. The station was turned off for good two days later on March 28.
