= WRZE =

- Kingstree, South Carolina; United States
- Frequency: 94.1 MHz
- Branding: Rock 94.1 - 97.9

Programming
- Format: Classic rock

Ownership
- Owner: iHeartMedia, Inc.; (iHM Licenses, LLC)
- Sister stations: WDAR-FM, WDSC, WEGX, WJMX, WJMX-FM, WWRK, WZTF

History
- First air date: 1998; 28 years ago (as WGSS)
- Former call signs: WAOT (1995–1996, CP); WGSS (1996–2009)

Technical information
- Licensing authority: FCC
- Facility ID: 3121
- Class: A
- ERP: 6,000 watts
- HAAT: 100 meters (330 ft)
- Transmitter coordinates: 33°43′32.00″N 79°58′19.00″W
- Repeater: 970 kHz (WWRK)

Links
- Public license information: Public file; LMS
- Webcast: Listen Live
- Website: therockfms.iheart.com

WRZE (94.1 FM) is a radio station airing a classic rock format. Licensed to Kingstree, South Carolina, United States, the station is owned by iHeartMedia, Inc., through licensee iHM Licenses, LLC.

== History ==
In a deal announced in February 1997, Root Communications Ltd. announced plans to buy eight radio stations owned by Florence, South Carolina-based Atlantic Broadcasting, including WGSS. Qantum Communications Inc. purchased Florence's Root Communications Group LP stations in 2003.

WGSS was "94.1 The Light", an urban gospel station, prior to 2009.

At one time, WRZE simulcast WDAR-FM and played adult contemporary music.

In 2012, Sunny 94.1 was flipped to mainstream urban "Swagga". It was also simulcast on WWRK. Later WWRK moved from 1400 to 970 AM.

On May 15, 2014, Qantum Communications announced that it would sell its 29 stations, including WRZE, to Clear Channel Communications (now iHeartMedia), in a transaction connected to Clear Channel's sale of WALK AM-FM in Patchogue, New York to Connoisseur Media via Qantum. The transaction was consummated on September 9, 2014.

In August 2017, WRZE, WWRK and the translators began simulcasting WDAR-FM, which took over the urban contemporary format.

On September 14, 2017 WRZE, WWRK and the translators dropped the urban simulcast with WDAR-FM and switched to classic rock, branded as "Rock 94.1 - 97.9 - 105.9". The station airs the syndicated "Rover's Morning Glory".

== Call letter history ==
The station was assigned the call letters WAOT on December 1, 1995. On March 22, 1996, the station changed its call sign to WGSS. On March 26, 2009, the station changed its call sign to WRZE.
