= Charleston County Public Library =

Public library in South Carolina, United States

- 32.7886°N 79.9311°W
- Type: Public library
- Service area: Charleston County, South Carolina

The Charleston County Public Library is a public library in Charleston, South Carolina. It began operations in 1931 as the Charleston Free Library.

== History ==
The Charleston County Public Library began operations in 1931 as the Charleston Free Library with support from the Carnegie Corporation of New York and the Rosenwald Fund.

Under the terms of its grant from the Rosenwald Fund, the main branch of the library—first located at 121 Rutledge Avenue and later at 94 Rutledge Avenue—was racially integrated. In practice, however, while access to the building itself was open to all races, specific opening hours were observed for each specific race. Segregation began to gradually loosen in the early 1960s and was formally abolished in 1965.

The main branch of the library was moved from the Routledge Avenue location to a new facility on Marion Square, adjacent to the state arsenal, in 1960. In 1998 it moved to its fourth, and — as of 2024 — current location at 68 Calhoun Street.

In 2021, the Charleston County Public Library was the only public library in South Carolina given a four star rating by the Library Journal. In 2022, it moved to a five star rating, the Library Journal's highest rating.

== Branches and collection ==
As of 2021, the Charleston County Public Library operated four branch libraries and seven community libraries.

== Governance ==
The library is governed by a board of trustees appointed by the Charleston County Council.

== See also ==
- Charleston Library Society
- List of libraries
