= WZTF =

- Scranton, South Carolina; United States
- Broadcast area: Florence, South Carolina
- Frequency: 102.9 MHz
- Branding: The Flo 102.9

Programming
- Format: Urban adult contemporary

Ownership
- Owner: iHeartMedia, Inc.; (iHM Licenses, LLC)
- Sister stations: WDAR-FM, WDSC, WEGX, WJMX, WJMX-FM, WRZE, WWRK

History
- First air date: 1991; 35 years ago
- Former call signs: WJZX (1991); WSQN (1991–2003); WURV (2003–2005); WWRK (2005–2006); WWRK-FM (2006)

Technical information
- Licensing authority: FCC
- Facility ID: 3115
- Class: A
- ERP: 2,900 watts
- HAAT: 142 meters (466 ft)
- Transmitter coordinates: 34°0′39.00″N 79°45′24.00″W

Links
- Public license information: Public file; LMS
- Website: theflo1029.com

WZTF (102.9 FM) is a radio station broadcasting an urban adult contemporary format. Licensed to Scranton, South Carolina, United States, the station serves the Florence, South Carolina area. The station is currently owned by iHeartMedia, Inc., through licensee iHM Licenses, LLC. Its studios are located in Florence, and its transmitter is located south of Effingham, South Carolina.

== History ==
WSQN was adult contemporary before becoming a soft AC station called "light and easy Sunny 102.9" airing a syndicated format from Broadcast Programming called AC45+. Its later formats included oldies and, under Root Communications, "Old school" R & B oldies. As WURV ("The River") it was classic rock, and it was modern rock "Rock 102.9" and then classic hits "102.9 the Point" using the letters WWRK.

In a deal announced in February 1997, Root Communications Ltd. announced plans to buy eight radio stations owned by Florence-based Atlantic Broadcasting, including WSQN. Qantum Communications Inc. purchased Florence's Root Communications Group LP stations in 2003.

On May 15, 2014, Qantum Communications announced that it would sell its 29 stations, including WZTF, to Clear Channel Communications (now iHeartMedia), in a transaction connected to Clear Channel's sale of WALK AM-FM in Patchogue, New York to Connoisseur Media via Qantum. The transaction was consummated on September 9, 2014.
