= WBPB =

- Pickens, South Carolina; United States
- Broadcast area: Upstate South Carolina
- Frequency: 1540 kHz
- Branding: Radio La Voz

Programming
- Language: Spanish
- Format: Religious

Ownership
- Owner: Berea Baptist Broadcasting, Spanish

History
- First air date: 1967
- Last air date: 2026
- Former call signs: WKKR (1966–1977); WTGF (1977–1980); WPKZ {1980–1984); WTBI (1984–2022)

Technical information
- Licensing authority: FCC
- Facility ID: 64497
- Class: D
- Power: 10,000 watts day; 1,000 watts critical hours
- Transmitter coordinates: 34°51′37.4″N 82°43′24.5″W

Links
- Public license information: Public file; LMS
- Webcast: Listen live
- Website: www.radiolavoz.net

WBPB was a non-commercial religious radio station serving the Upstate, including Greenville and Pickens County, South Carolina. The station broadcast on 1540 AM with a power of 10,000 watts day and 1,000 watts critical hours. It operated from 1967 to 2026.

== History ==
The station signed on as WKKR in 1967 serving Pickens, South Carolina. It became WTGF in 1977 and then was sold in 1979, becoming WPKZ in 1980. On January 24, 1984, the station was sold to Tabernacle Christian School in Greenville, with the call sign changed to WTBI. An FM station simulcast, WTBI-FM 91.5, licensed to Greenville was added in early 1991, later upgrading its power in 2007, covering all of the area covered by the AM signal. AM 1540 only provided coverage to the local Pickens County area, and B grade coverage to much of neighboring Greenville County. As WTBI, both stations aired a mix of Southern Gospel music and preaching from Fundamental, Independent Baptist churches. Much of the preaching and teaching programming was produced by churches in the Greenville area, in Pickens County]]==, and from various churches in the Appalachian Mountains area. Other churches from other parts of the United States also produce programs. The station also featured Sunday, Wednesday, and other special worship services from Tabernacle Baptist Church.

In 2020, the simulcast was broken after 30 years and 1540 AM became a Spanish religious station known as "Radio La Voz, 1540". After broadcasting via lease agreement for two years, it was donated by Tabernacle Christian School to Berea Baptist Broadcasting, who had been leasing it. The donation was consummated on September 12, 2022, and its call sign was changed from WTBI to WBPB, effective November 1, 2022.

Berea Baptist Broadcasting closed WBPB in August 2026 and returned the license to the Federal Communications Commission. It was cancelled on August 24.
