= WZKQ-LP =

DWZKQ-LP
- Hodges, South Carolina; United States
- Frequency: 105.3 MHz

Programming
- Format: Defunct

Ownership
- Owner: Hodges Women in Broadcasting Club

Technical information
- Licensing authority: FCC
- Facility ID: 132314
- Class: L1
- ERP: 48 watts
- HAAT: 43.0 meters (141.1 ft)
- Transmitter coordinates: 34°16′28″N 82°14′2″W

Links
- Public license information: LMS

WZKQ-LP (105.3 FM) was a low-power radio station licensed to Hodges, South Carolina, United States. The station was owned by Hodges Women in Broadcasting Club.

On October 6, 2015, the Federal Communications Commission (FCC) notified the station's owners that it would consider WZKQ-LP's license to have expired on June 20, 2015, due to having been silent for more than 12 months, unless they were shown otherwise. The notice was returned as undeliverable, and the FCC deleted the WZKQ-LP call sign on November 12, 2015.
