= WCMG =

- Latta, South Carolina; United States
- Broadcast area: Florence, South Carolina
- Frequency: 94.3 MHz
- Branding: Magic 94.3

Programming
- Format: Urban adult contemporary

Ownership
- Owner: Cumulus Media; (Cumulus Licensing LLC)
- Sister stations: WBZF, WMXT, WWFN-FM, WYNN, WYNN-FM

History
- Former call signs: WWPD (1988–1993); WLXP (1993–1994)

Technical information
- Licensing authority: FCC
- Facility ID: 72929
- Class: C3
- ERP: 10,500 watts
- HAAT: 153 meters (502 ft)
- Transmitter coordinates: 34°26′20.00″N 79°29′44.00″W

Links
- Public license information: Public file; LMS
- Webcast: Listen Live
- Website: magic943fm.com

WCMG (94.3 FM) is a radio station broadcasting an urban adult contemporary format. Licensed to Latta, South Carolina, United States, the station is owned by Cumulus Media.

== History ==
WCMG went on the air as WATP-FM, the sister station to now-defunct WATP (1430 AM). Both stations were licensed to Marion, South Carolina. WATP (AM) played country music, while WATP-FM played beautiful music. As WKXS Kiss 94, the FM station played country music before a switch to CHR/Urban Contemporary (also known as "CHUrban", a forerunner to the rhythmic contemporary format) in February 1988 under their new call letters WWPD (Power 94); the AM took over the WKXS letters and played oldies until having its license cancelled in 1997.

As WLXP, the station aired Christian country.

Later, WCMG was "Magic 94.3", playing urban adult contemporary music and featuring programming from ABC Radio.

On August 16, 2010, WCMG changed their format to active rock, branded as "94.3 The Dam".

On March 6, 2014, WCMG changed their format back to urban adult contemporary, branded as "Magic 94.3". The station changed at 9:43 a.m., after promoting for a few hours that "The MAGIC is coming back to the Pee Dee", and stunting with songs with the word "magic" in their names (culminating with "Black Magic Woman" by Santana). The first song on the revived "Magic" was "Happy" by Pharrell Williams.
