= WWRK =

- Florence, South Carolina; United States
- Broadcast area: Florence metropolitan area
- Frequency: 970 kHz
- Branding: Rock 94.1 - 97.9

Programming
- Language: English
- Format: Classic rock

Ownership
- Owner: iHeartMedia; (iHM Licenses, LLC)
- Sister stations: WDAR-FM; WDSC; WEGX; WJMX; WJMX-FM; WRZE; WZTF

History
- First air date: July 13, 1947
- Former call signs: WJMX (1947–2013)

Technical information
- Licensing authority: FCC
- Facility ID: 3112
- Class: B
- Power: 10,000 watts (day); 31 watts (night)
- Transmitter coordinates: 34°14′02″N 79°46′51″W
- Translator: 97.9 W250BJ (Florence)
- Repeater: 94.1 WRZE (Kingstree)

Links
- Public license information: Public file; LMS
- Webcast: Listen live (via iHeartRadio)
- Website: thepeedeesrockstation.iheart.com

WWRK is a classic rock radio station located in Florence, South Carolina. The station is licensed by the Federal Communications Commission (FCC) to broadcast on 970 AM with 10,000 watts of power during the day, and 31 watts at night, both non-directional. WWRK is owned by iHeartMedia.

== History ==
WWRK signed on as WJMX on July 13, 1947. This station also covered NASCAR races in the past like the 1955 Southern 500 that took place in nearby Darlington. The station featured local as well as national programming from the ABC Radio Network. By the 1980s, WJMX was Top 40 under the handle "97X" but was beat out by new upstart WPDZ (now WJMX-FM). The format migrated to its newly acquired 106.3 FM frequency (now WYNN-FM) and the station switched to Adult Contemporary before transitioning to News/Talk.

Qantum Communications Inc. purchased Florence's Root Communications Group LP stations in 2003.

On July 16, 2012, WJMX announced that after carrying The Rush Limbaugh Show for over 20 years, the station would replace him with The Mike Huckabee Show. At the time, the station manager said that the distributor wanted too much money to air the show. Limbaugh was then picked up by WFRK.

The station changed its call sign to the current WWRK on October 30, 2013, swapping calls with its sister station at 1400 AM. At that time, WWRK began simulcasting urban contemporary WRZE, which was branded as "Swagga 94.1 & 105.9".

On May 15, 2014, Qantum Communications announced that it would sell its 29 stations, including WWRK, to Clear Channel Communications (now iHeartMedia), in a transaction connected to Clear Channel's sale of WALK AM-FM in Patchogue, New York to Connoisseur Media via Qantum. The transaction was consummated on September 9, 2014.

In August 2017, WRZE, WWRK and the translators began simulcasting WDAR-FM, which took over the urban contemporary format.

On September 14, 2017, WRZE, WWRK and the translators dropped the simulcast with WDAR-FM and switched to classic rock, branded as "Rock 94.1 - 97.9 - 105.9". The stations air the syndicated "Rover's Morning Glory" in mornings from 6 to 10 am.

As of 2021, the simulcast on 105.9 FM had ended, as W290CD began simulcasting WJMX. and that translator was used by WJMX.

== Translators ==
In addition to the main station, WWRK is relayed by a translator to widen its broadcast area.

Call sign	Frequency	City of license	FID	ERP (W)	Class	FCC info
W250BJ	97.9 FM	Florence, South Carolina	158024	250	D	LMS
