= WJMX (AM) =

- Darlington, South Carolina; United States
- Broadcast area: Florence, South Carolina
- Frequency: 1400 kHz
- Branding: News Talk 1400

Programming
- Format: News/talk
- Affiliations: ABC News Radio; Premiere Networks; Salem Radio Network; Townhall; Westwood One

Ownership
- Owner: iHeartMedia, Inc.; (iHM Licenses, LLC)
- Sister stations: WDAR-FM, WDSC, WEGX, WJMX-FM, WRZE, WWRK, WZTF

History
- First air date: 1955; 71 years ago
- Former call signs: WDAL (1953–1954); WPFD (1954–1959); WDAR (1959–1982); WKGE (1982–1985); WDAR (1985–1995); WDZS (1995–1997); WPFM (1997–2006); WWRK (2006–2013)

Technical information
- Licensing authority: FCC
- Facility ID: 3119
- Class: C
- Power: 1,000 watts
- Transmitter coordinates: 34°18′58.00″N 79°53′17.00″W
- Translators: 104.5 W283AB (Florence); 105.9 W290CD (Darlington)

Links
- Public license information: Public file; LMS
- Webcast: Listen Live
- Website: newstalk1400online.iheart.com

WJMX (1400 kHz) is an AM radio station broadcasting a news/talk format. Licensed to Darlington, South Carolina, United States, it serves the Florence area. The station is owned by iHeartMedia, Inc., through licensee iHM Licenses, LLC, and features programming from Premiere Networks, the Salem Radio Network, Townhall, and Westwood One. Its studios are located in Florence, and its transmitter is located in Darlington.

== History ==
At one time, this station was called WDAR. In the 60s and 70s, it was known as "Top Gun Country WDAR". Other formats have included beautiful music, classic rock (simulcast with WDAR-FM) and adult standards.

Prior to the switch to WWRK, this station was WPFM and was located at 1350 AM. In 1997, when it was owned by Root Communications, Ltd., WPFM applied to change its frequency to 1400 AM.

Qantum Communications Inc. purchased Florence's Root Communications Group LP stations in 2003. At that time, WPFM had moved from 1350 to 1400.

WWRK played gospel music as "The Light" and was simulcast on WDSC.

In September 2012, WWRK began simulcasting urban contemporary WRZE "Swagga 94.1". The station changed its call sign to the current WJMX on October 30, 2013, swapping calls with its sister station at 970 AM.

On May 15, 2014, Qantum Communications announced that it would sell its 29 stations, including WJMX, to Clear Channel Communications (now iHeartMedia), in a transaction connected to Clear Channel's sale of WALK AM-FM in Patchogue, New York, to Connoisseur Media via Qantum. The transaction was consummated on September 9, 2014.

== Translators ==
In addition to the main station, WJMX is relayed by two translators to widen its broadcast area.

Broadcast translators for WJMX
Call sign	Frequency	City of license	FID	ERP (W)	Class	FCC info
W283AB	104.5 FM	Florence, South Carolina	3116	250	D	LMS
W290CD	105.9 FM	Darlington, South Carolina	3117	145	D	LMS
