= WKMG (AM) =

Radio station in Newberry, South Carolina (1968–2017)

- Newberry, South Carolina; United States
- Frequency: 1520 kHz

Programming
- Format: Nostalgia

Ownership
- Owner: Service Radio Company, Inc.

History
- First air date: May 22, 1968
- Last air date: November 9, 2017 (date of license cancellation)

Technical information
- Licensing authority: FCC
- Facility ID: 17766
- Class: D
- Power: 1,000 watts day
- Transmitter coordinates: 34°15′12.5″N 81°35′43.4″W

Links
- Public license information: Public file; LMS

WKMG (1520 AM) was a radio station broadcasting all varieties of music from 1968 to 2011 in Newberry, South Carolina.

The station license was last owned by Cornell Blakely. Service Radio Company, Inc. owns the property.

== History ==
The station signed on May 22, 1968, with a country music format. The license transferred from Service Radio Company, Inc. to Durst Broadcasting Company, Inc. on January 1, 1989, and from Durst to Cornell Blakely on March 20, 2001.

WKMG was deleted by the Federal Communications Commission (FCC) on December 2, 2011, for failure to file for the renewal of its license, which expired a day earlier. The license was reinstated on December 15, 2011.

On October 4, 2017, the FCC informed WKMG that it believed the station had been silent for over a year and ordered the station to provide its full operational status since August 9, 2011; in attempting to inform WKMG of unpaid debts it owed to the commission on May 10, 2017, FCC staffers discovered that license owner Cornell Blakely had died on December 2, 2013, and that WKMG's phone number had been disconnected. After the FCC's notification was returned as undeliverable, the WKMG license was cancelled on November 9, 2017.
