= WRBK =

Radio station in Richburg, South Carolina

- Richburg, South Carolina; United States
- Broadcast area: Charlotte metropolitan area
- Frequency: 90.3 MHz

Programming
- Format: Oldies

Ownership
- Owner: Richburg Educational Broadcasters

Technical information
- Licensing authority: FCC
- Facility ID: 81638
- Class: C3
- ERP: 7,500 watts (horizontal polarization); 7,300 watts (vertical)
- HAAT: 164 meters (538 ft)
- Transmitter coordinates: 34°41′46″N 81°01′23″W
- Translator: 92.1 W221EO (York)

Links
- Public license information: Public file; LMS

WRBK (90.3 MHz) is a non-profit oldies radio station located in Chester, South Carolina. It is simulcast on WNBK (90.9 MHz) in Whitmire, South Carolina, and WEBK (91.1 MHz) in Society Hill, South Carolina. It is also heard on an FM translator station: W221EO (92.1 MHz) in York, South Carolina.

WRBK is programmed using automation rather than featuring live disc jockeys. Jingles featuring the station's frequency and call sign are sometimes played between songs. At other times, weather forecasts, public service announcements, or underwriting announcements for local businesses air between songs. However, at many other times, songs are simply played back-to-back with no bumpers in-between.

Its playlist is very diverse and broad, featuring the biggest hits from the 1950s, 60s, 70s, and early 80s. But some lesser-known artists whose songs hit the charts are heard as well. Prior to 2009, most songs came from the years 1955 through 1977. Then in 2009, the playlist was extended to include songs from the early 1980s as well, making its musical timespan from 1955 to 1984.

In addition to music, WRBK broadcasts community interest programs, including local high school football games on Friday nights and Sunday church worship services.

Its signal reaches areas in both North and South Carolina. Northward, it reaches part of the Charlotte market, and can easily be picked up in Union County, North Carolina and in the Southern portions of Mecklenburg County. Hickory station WFHE, which broadcasts on the same frequency, blocks out WRBK's signal north of Charlotte.

WRBK's main signal on 90.3 MHz is directional to protect 90.1 WEPR in Greenville. The WNBK-FM 90.9 signal covers the area between Union and Newberry. WRBK is also simulcast on 91.1 WEBK-FM, licensed to Society Hill, South Carolina.

Broadcast translators for WRBK
Call sign	Frequency	City of license	FID	ERP (W)	HAAT	Class	Transmitter coordinates	FCC info
WNBK	90.9 FM	Whitmire, South Carolina	175985	1,800 (horiz.); 1,610 (vert.)	102 m (335 ft)	A	34°29′52″N 81°32′55″W	LMS
WEBK	91.1 FM	Society Hill, South Carolina	175269	430	38.7 m (127 ft)	A	34°32′13″N 79°54′29″W	LMS
