= WKSC (AM) =

- Kershaw, South Carolina; United States
- Frequency: 1300 kHz

Programming
- Format: Talk

Ownership
- Owner: J. Stanley Griffin; (Sound Ideas, LLC)

History
- First air date: 1962
- Last air date: January 22, 2013

Technical information
- Facility ID: 34293
- Class: D
- Power: 500 watts day; 88 watts night
- Transmitter coordinates: 34°33′30″N 80°33′34″W

WKSC (1300 AM) was a radio station licensed to Kershaw, South Carolina, United States. The station was owned by J. Stanley Griffin, through licensee Sound Ideas, LLC.

The station was an affiliate of Scott Shannon's The True Oldies Channel from ABC Radio. It is no longer listed on the website.

On May 17, 2010, WKSC returned to the air with talk. On January 22, 2013, WKSC went silent. The station's license was cancelled by the Federal Communications Commission on April 21, 2014.
