= WPJM =

- Greer, South Carolina; United States
- Broadcast area: Upstate South Carolina
- Frequency: 800 AM
- Branding: WPJM AM 800

Programming
- Format: Gospel Music

Ownership
- Owner: Full Gospel WPJM 800 AM Radio, Inc.

History
- First air date: June 15, 1949

Technical information
- Licensing authority: FCC
- Facility ID: 2319
- Class: B
- ERP: 1000 Watts (day); 438 Watts (night)
- Transmitter coordinates: 34°56′59″N 82°14′43″W

Links
- Public license information: Public file; LMS
- Website: www.800wpjm.com

WPJM is a Gospel music radio station located in Greer, South Carolina. The station is licensed by the FCC to broadcast on 800 AM with an ERP of 1000 Watts during the day and 438 Watts at night under a nondirectional pattern.

== Station history ==
WPJM signed on the air June 15, 1949. The original call letters were WEAB, EAB being the initials of the original owner Ed A. Burch. Mr Burch also owned the weekly newspaper, The Greer Citizen. Currently, it programs an Urban Gospel format, and is the only station in the Greenville-Spartanburg area doing so.
