= WBSC (AM) =

DWBSC
- Bennettsville, South Carolina; United States
- Broadcast area: Bennettsville, South Carolina; Laurinburg, North Carolina; Rockingham, North Carolina
- Frequency: 1550 kHz

Programming
- Format: Defunct

Ownership
- Owner: D-Mitch Broadcasting, Inc.

History
- First air date: June 1947
- Call sign meaning: W Bennettsville, South Carolina

Technical information
- Facility ID: 5214
- Class: B
- Power: 10,000 Watts daytime 5,000 Watts nighttime
- Transmitter coordinates: 34°40′52.0″N 79°42′4.0″W

WBSC (1550 AM) was a commercial radio station licensed to serve the community of Bennettsville, South Carolina. WBSC was last owned and operated by D-Mitch Broadcasting, Inc. The station, established in June 1947, fell silent in October 2011 and had its broadcast license revoked by the Federal Communications Commission in November 2012.

== Coverage area ==
The station broadcast from a transmitter site north of Bennettsville, South Carolina and served Marlboro and Chesterfield County in South Carolina, and Richmond and Scotland County in North Carolina, including the cities of Bennettsville, South Carolina, Laurinburg, North Carolina, and Rockingham, North Carolina. The station ran 10,000 watts during the day from a 1 tower omni-directional array, and 5,000 watts at night from a 5 tower array with a directional pattern to the southeast.

== History ==
=== Early years ===
In June 1947, WBSC took to the airwaves for the first time under the ownership of Loys Marsden Hawley, with programming from the Mutual Broadcasting System. Initially, WBSC broadcast on 1400 AM, but changed to 1550 AM sometime between 1951 and 1952.

=== Changing hands ===
In 1949, Loys Marsden Hawley sold WBSC to Bennettsville Broadcasting Company for an unknown sum. In 1956, WBSC was again sold, this time to the Atlantic Coast Life Insurance Company. WBSC would change hands again on September 23, 1962, this time being sold to Big Bend Broadcasting. At the time of the sale, WBSC was carrying a Country format.

By 1970, WBSC was airing a mix of Gospel and country music, along with the normal fare from the Mutual Broadcasting System. In 1973, the station dropped its Gospel and Country format for a contemporary one (what today would be considered Oldies). By 1980, the station was airing a variety format, with contemporary, Gospel, and country music being heard. The station would revert to a Gospel and country format in 1984.

In 1990, WBSC would change formats again, this time to oldies and would drop Mutual Broadcasting System for the Satellite Music Network, the predecessor of the ABC Radio Network. In April 1995, Big Bend Broadcasting sold WBSC to D-Mitch Broadcasting, Inc. At the time of the sale, WBSC was still airing an Oldies format. In 1997, the new owners, D-Mitch Broadcasting, tweaked the station's format, adding Gospel music along with the oldies.

== Fines and Lawsuit ==
On June 27, 2008, the station was fined $12,000 for "failure to maintain operational Emergency Alert System ("EAS") equipment and failure to maintain and make available a complete public inspection file."

A lawsuit was filed against D-Mitch Broadcasting, Inc. on March 4, 2010, to collect the $12,000 fine from 2008. On May 12, 2010, D-Mitch Broadcasting, Inc. was ordered by the court, in default, to pay the $12,000 fine, plus $370.00 in court costs. The defendants, D-Mitch Broadcasting, Inc., "failed to appear, plead, or otherwise defend as provided in the Federal Rules of Civil Procedure" according to the Default Judgement.

=== Falling silent ===
In the station's November 29, 2011, License Renewal Application, the station had been off the air "due [to] lack of funds" since October 6, 2011. It was also noted that the station's Emergency Alert System equipment was not working, but was to be replaced, while the public inspection file was updated. In January 2012, the station's former engineer told the Huffington Post that he was let go when the station "went under" in October 2011.

On May 9, 2012, D-Mitch Broadcasting, Inc. was notified that they had neglected to file a "Special Temporary Authority" application declaring WBSC silent under FCC rules. D-Mitch Broadcasting, Inc. was given "until 12:01 a.m., on October 7, 2012" to return to the air or their license would "automatically expire as a matter of law".

On November 29, 2012, the FCC had not received a reply to their May 9 letter to D-Mitch Broadcasting, Inc. and "based on the lack of a response to [the FCC's] status inquiry letter" the FCC declared that WBSC had been off the air for more than 12 months. Under the terms of the Telecommunications Act of 1996, as a matter of law a radio station's broadcast license is subject to automatic forfeiture and cancellation if they fail to broadcast for one full year. The FCC cancelled WBSC's license and deleted the WBSC call sign from the database. Additionally, the station's November 29, 2011, License Renewal Application was dismissed. The November 29, 2012, letter was sent back to the FCC on January 22, 2013, with a "Return to Sender" label on the original envelope.

== In other media ==
In October 2008, WBSC was a focus of the South Carolina Educational Television documentary Losing Their Voices about the plight of local radio stations in an era of automation and group ownership.
