= WDOG (AM) =

Coordinates: 33°13′25″N 81°21′35″W

Barnwell, South Carolina; United States
- Broadcast area: Barnwell, South Carolina
- Frequency: 1460 kHz
- Branding: Barnwell's ESPN Radio 1460

Programming
- Format: Defunct (was Sports)

Ownership
- Owner: Big Dog Radio
- Sister stations: WDOG-FM

History
- First air date: January 1, 1966
- Call sign meaning: Big DOG Radio

Technical information
- Facility ID: 24621
- Class: D
- Power: 320 watts day 45 watts night

Links
- Website: bigdogradio.com

WDOG (1460 AM) was an ESPN Radio branded sports radio station in Barnwell, South Carolina, United States. ESPN Radio broadcast at 1460 kHz, on the AM dial.

WDOG had Clemson Tigers football coverage, while WDOG-FM has South Carolina Gamecocks football coverage during the college football season. WDOG-FM also carries Gamecock basketball and baseball games during the respective seasons.

WDOG's license was surrendered to the Federal Communications Commission on June 9, 2022, and cancelled on June 13.
