= WYNN (AM) =

Simulcast of WBZF Hartsville, South Carolina
- Florence, South Carolina; United States
- Broadcast area: Florence, South Carolina
- Frequency: 540 kHz
- Branding: Glory 98.5 & 540

Programming
- Format: Urban Gospel

Ownership
- Owner: Cumulus Media; (Cumulus Licensing LLC)
- Sister stations: WBZF, WCMG, WMXT, WWFN-FM, WYNN-FM

History
- First air date: November 5, 1958

Technical information
- Licensing authority: FCC
- Facility ID: 22048
- Class: D
- Power: 250 watts day; 166 watts night
- Transmitter coordinates: 34°13′5.00″N 79°48′30.00″W

Links
- Public license information: Public file; LMS
- Webcast: Listen live; Listen live (via Audacy); Listen live (via iHeartRadio)
- Website: glory985.com

WYNN (540 kHz) is an AM radio station broadcasting an urban gospel format. Licensed to Florence, South Carolina, United States, it serves the Florence area. The station is currently owned by Cumulus Media.

From October 2025 to June 2026 WYNN played classic country as "540 the Hound", using the Westwood One format. The station has mostly simulcast WBZF in recent years.
