= WQPD (FM) =

- Marion, South Carolina; United States
- Broadcast area: Florence, South Carolina
- Frequency: 100.5 MHz
- Branding: HIS Radio 100.5

Programming
- Format: Contemporary Christian

Ownership
- Owner: Radio Training Network

History
- First air date: 1991 (as WKSY)
- Former call signs: WQTI (1990–1990, CP); WKSY (1990–1996); WBZF (1996–1999); WFSF (1999–2003); WHLZ (2003–2017); WQPD (2017–2023); WWFN-FM (2023–2026)
- Call sign meaning: PD for Pee Dee

Technical information
- Licensing authority: FCC
- Facility ID: 11653
- Class: C3
- ERP: 25,000 watts
- HAAT: 100 meters (330 ft)
- Transmitter coordinates: 34°23′26″N 79°35′25″W

Links
- Public license information: Public file; LMS
- Webcast: Listen live
- Website: www.hisradio.com

WQPD (100.5 FM) is a contemporary Christian radio station licensed to Marion, South Carolina, United States, serving the Florence area. The station is currently owned by the Radio Training Network.

== History ==
Classy 100.5 signed on in December 1991.

The first call sign for the 100.5 frequency was WQTI, at the same time the call sign WQTR went to what is now WWFN-FM.

WKSY played country music.

Cumulus Media bought classic rock WHSC-FM 98.5, alternative rock WBZF 100.5, and WMXT. The adult contemporary format from WMXT moved to 100.5, while alternative rock moved to 98.5. Later, the call sign WFSF was used. Formats on 100.5 FM have included adult contemporary and contemporary hit radio (CHR).

Prior to 2003, the WHLZ call sign, "Wheelz" name and country format belonged to a station in Manning, South Carolina, which moved to Charleston, South Carolina and became WIHB.

On July 3, 2013, at 3 p.m., WHLZ rebranded as "Nash FM 100.5".

On April 17, 2017, after stunting with music from each decade from the 1960s through the 1990s, WHLZ changed its format from country to hot adult contemporary, branded as "Q100.5" under the new WQPD call sign. The format includes Bob and Sheri in the mornings and an automated Westwood One-originated format the remainder of the day and weekends.

On August 28, 2023, WQPD changed its format from hot adult contemporary (which moved to WWFN-FM as "Q100.1") to sports, branded as "100.5 The Game", under a new WWFN-FM call sign. The station operated as a half-day (6 a.m. to 6 p.m.) simulcast of sister station WNKT in Eastover.

On May 8, 2026, Cumulus announced it would sell WWFN, amongst other stations, to Radio Training Network for $2.45 million; the station was expected to flip to contemporary Christian music under one of RTN's brands, with RTN's His Radio in the footprint of WWFN-FM. The sports programming moved back to the 100.1 frequency ahead of the sale.
