= WMXT =

Coordinates: 33.977°N 79.809°W

- Pamplico, South Carolina; United States
- Broadcast area: Florence, South Carolina
- Frequency: 102.1 MHz
- Branding: 102.1 The Fox

Programming
- Format: Classic Hits
- Affiliations: Premiere Networks; Westwood One

Ownership
- Owner: Cumulus Media; (Cumulus Licensing LLC)
- Sister stations: WBZF, WCMG, WWFN-FM, WYNN, WYNN-FM

History
- First air date: November 1, 1990
- Former call signs: WPHO (2/1990-8/1990, CP)
- Call sign meaning: MiX T (former branding)

Technical information
- Licensing authority: FCC
- Facility ID: 51420
- Class: C2
- ERP: 50,000 watts horizontal 49,400 watts vertical
- HAAT: 146 meters

Links
- Public license information: Public file; LMS
- Webcast: Listen live Listen Live via iHeart
- Website: 1021thefox.com

WMXT (102.1 FM), known as "102.1 The Fox", is a Classic Hits music-formatted radio station in the Florence, South Carolina, United States, market.

== History ==
Mix 102.1 was an adult contemporary radio station which aired Paul Harvey.

Cumulus Media bought classic rock WHSC-FM 98.5, alternative rock WBZF 100.5, and WMXT. WMXT has remained Florence's home for Classic Hits, with similar songs from around the same generation being found on WSIM in Lamar.
