= WYNN-FM =

Coordinates: 34.218°N 79.808°W

- Florence, South Carolina; United States
- Broadcast area: Pee Dee Region
- Frequency: 106.3 MHz
- Branding: WYNN 106.3

Programming
- Format: Mainstream urban
- Affiliations: Compass Media Networks

Ownership
- Owner: Cumulus Media; (Cumulus Licensing LLC)
- Sister stations: WBZF, WCMG, WMXT, WWFN-FM, WYNN

History
- First air date: October 1, 1964 (as WSTN)
- Former call signs: WSTN (1964–1985); WJMX-FM (1985–1988)

Technical information
- Licensing authority: FCC
- Facility ID: 22049
- Class: A
- ERP: 6,000 watts
- HAAT: 100 meters (330 ft)

Links
- Public license information: Public file; LMS
- Webcast: Listen live
- Website: wynn1063.com

WYNN-FM (106.3 MHz) is a radio station broadcasting a mainstream urban format. The station is licensed by the Federal Communications Commission (FCC) to serve Florence, South Carolina, and broadcast with an effective radiated power (ERP) of 6 kW. WYNN-FM is owned by Cumulus Media.

== History ==
WSTN-FM played beautiful music in the early 1980s. The station was acquired by WJMX AM 970 and switched to CHR in January 1985 as "106X". In 1988, format rival WPDZ 103.3 was acquired and the station transferred the format and call letters to the newly acquired frequency. In November 1988, the station was sold to WYNN AM 540, which migrated its urban format to FM.

WYNN once aired Doug Banks in the morning and now broadcasts DeDe McGuire.
