= WBZF =

- Hartsville, South Carolina; United States
- Broadcast area: Florence, South Carolina
- Frequency: 98.5 MHz
- Branding: Glory 98.5 & 540

Programming
- Format: Urban gospel

Ownership
- Owner: Cumulus Media; (Cumulus Licensing LLC)
- Sister stations: WCMG; WMXT; WWFN-FM; WYNN; WYNN-FM

History
- First air date: November 5, 1992 (as WHSC-FM)
- Former call signs: WHSC-FM (1992–1999)

Technical information
- Licensing authority: FCC
- Facility ID: 26327
- Class: A
- ERP: 6,000 watts
- HAAT: 100 meters (330 ft)
- Transmitter coordinates: 34°27′54″N 80°5′45″W
- Repeater: 540 WYNN (Florence)

Links
- Public license information: Public file; LMS
- Webcast: Listen live
- Website: www.glory985.com

WBZF (98.5 FM), known as "Glory 98.5 & 540", is an urban gospel formatted radio station, licensed to Hartsville, South Carolina in the Florence, South Carolina area.

== History ==
WBZF played modern rock as "The Buzz" on 100.5 FM. Cumulus Media bought classic rock WHSC-FM 98.5, which moved to WMXT. WMXT's music moved to 100.5, and WBZF moved to 98.5. Later WBZF switched to gospel music.
