= WCZZ =

- Greenwood, South Carolina; United States
- Broadcast area: Lakelands
- Frequency: 1090 kHz
- Branding: Magic 102.7

Programming
- Format: Urban adult contemporary

Ownership
- Owner: Broomfield Broadcasting, Inc.
- Sister stations: WZSN

History
- First air date: June 20, 1973
- Former call signs: WMTY (1973–2005)

Technical information
- Licensing authority: FCC
- Facility ID: 68856
- Class: D
- Power: 5,000 watts (days only); 2,250 watts (critical hours)
- Transmitter coordinates: 34°9′46″N 82°11′41″W
- Translator: 102.7 W274CC (Greenwood)

Links
- Public license information: Public file; LMS
- Website: 1027magic.com

WCZZ (1090 AM) is a commercial radio station licensed to Greenwood, South Carolina, United States, and serving the Lakelands area during the daytime hours only. It airs an urban adult contemporary format and is owned by Broomfield Broadcasting, Inc. Studios are on Montague Avenue in Greenwood. Programming is heard around the clock on 250-watt FM translator W274CC at 102.7 MHz in Greenwood.

== History ==
The station signed on the air on June 20, 1973. It was a 1,000 watt daytime-only station, using the call sign WMTY. It played country music and was a network affiliate of the Mutual Broadcasting System.

Through the 1980s and 90s, it has carried mostly satellite formats, including oldies as "Cruisin' Oldies 1090". The call letters were changed to the current WCZZ around 2000.

In 2006, the station became "Rejoice! 1090" carrying ABC Radio's Rejoice! Musical Soul Food satellite format. The station switched to sports talk as an affiliate of ESPN Radio in 2007. In June 2009, the station flipped to an urban gospel sound.

In 2017, the WCZZ returned to sports talk, this time using the Fox Sports Radio Network. It was branded as "Fox Sports Greenwood". The station added an FM translator, giving listeners the option to hear it on 1090 AM and 102.7 FM.

On November 13, 2020, WCZZ changed from sports radio to urban adult contemporary. Using the FM dial position in its name, it rebranded as "Magic 102.7".
