= WWFN-FM =

- Lake City, South Carolina; United States
- Broadcast area: Florence, South Carolina
- Frequency: 100.1 MHz
- Branding: 100.1 The Game

Programming
- Format: Sports
- Affiliations: Westwood One

Ownership
- Owner: Cumulus Media; (Cumulus Licensing LLC)
- Sister stations: WBZF; WCMG; WMXT; WYNN; WYNN-FM

History
- First air date: 1977 (as WGFG)
- Former call signs: WGFG-FM (1976–1989); WQTR (1989–1990); WWFN (1990–2004); WWFN-FM (2004–2023); WQPD (2023–2026)
- Call sign meaning: FN for "Fan"

Technical information
- Licensing authority: FCC
- Facility ID: 21745
- Class: A
- ERP: 3,300 watts
- HAAT: 132 meters (433 ft)
- Transmitter coordinates: 33°58′35″N 79°48′30″W

Links
- Public license information: Public file; LMS
- Webcast: Listen live
- Website: www.glory985.com

WWFN-FM (100.1 MHz) is a radio station licensed to Lake City, South Carolina, United States, serving the Florence area. The station is owned by Cumulus Media and broadcasts a sports radio format.

== History ==
Originally WGFG-FM, the station played beautiful music prior to the late 1980s, switching first to MOR and then to country music, at which time the station became WQTR "Q-100". The WWFN call sign was chosen when the station became an oldies station with the name "Fun 100". Over the years, WWFN/WWFN-FM has also played classic rock and CHR.

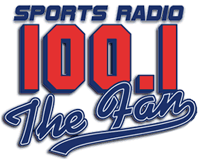
Logo as "100.1 The Fan"

In January 2013, WWFN switched affiliations from ESPN Radio to CBS Sports Radio.

On March 19, 2021, WWFN changed its format from sports to classic country, branded as "Classic Country 100.1".

On August 28, 2023, WWFN-FM changed its format from classic country to hot adult contemporary, branded as "Q100.1", which moved from WQPD (100.5 FM). The station picked up the WQPD call sign at the same time.

The station was simulcast on WYMB in Manning until March 2025, when WYMB was closed as part of a larger shutdown of underperforming Cumulus stations.

On October 24, 2025, WQPD began simulcasting sister urban gospel-formatted WBZF in Hartsville to boost coverage in the Florence area. In June 2026, the station flipped back to sports and reclaimed the WWFN-FM call sign.
