= WDSC (AM) =

- Dillon, South Carolina; United States
- Broadcast area: Florence, South Carolina
- Frequency: 800 kHz
- Branding: Fox Sports 800

Programming
- Format: Sports
- Affiliations: Fox Sports Radio

Ownership
- Owner: iHeartMedia, Inc.; (iHM Licenses, LLC)
- Sister stations: WDAR-FM, WEGX, WJMX, WJMX-FM, WRZE, WWRK, WZTF

History
- First air date: May 22, 1946; 79 years ago
- Call sign meaning: Dillon, South Carolina

Technical information
- Licensing authority: FCC
- Facility ID: 16935
- Class: B
- Power: 1,000 watts day 380 watts night
- Transmitter coordinates: 34°22′8.00″N 79°24′17.00″W

Links
- Public license information: Public file; LMS
- Webcast: Listen Live
- Website: sportsconnection800.iheart.com

WDSC (800 kHz) is an AM radio station broadcasting a sports format. Licensed to Dillon, South Carolina, United States, the station is currently owned by iHeartMedia, Inc., through licensee iHM Licenses, LLC. Its studios are located in Florence, and its transmitter is located south of Dillon.

== History ==
In 1993, WDSC had a sports talk format when it went off the air.

As of 1997, WDSC was owned by Root Communications, Ltd. Qantum Communications Inc. purchased Florence's Root Communications Group LP stations in 2003.

The station was simulcast on WWRK.

On April 11, 2013, WDSC changed their format from gospel to sports, with programming from NBC Sports Radio.

On May 15, 2014, Qantum Communications announced that it would sell its 29 stations, including WDSC, to Clear Channel Communications (now iHeartMedia), in a transaction connected to Clear Channel's sale of WALK AM-FM in Patchogue, New York to Connoisseur Media via Qantum. The transaction was consummated on September 9, 2014.

Previous logo
