= WFIS (AM) =

DWFIS
- Fountain Inn-Simpsonville, South Carolina; United States
- Frequency: 1600 kHz

Programming
- Format: Defunct (formerly News Talk Sports Information)
- Affiliations: Westwood One, CBS Radio, Jones Radio Network, TRN, Atlanta Braves 1977-2012, Atlanta Hawks 2000-2012, Atlanta Thrashers 2000-2011, Georgia Bulldogs football 2000-2012, Hillcrest High School Sports 1965-2012, Mauldin High School Football Tape Delay Saturday Mornings 2001-2004

Ownership
- Owner: Timeless Media, Inc.2013-silent/Golden Strip Broadcasting INC 1988-2013/ Fountain Inn-Simpsonville Enterprises INC 1956-1988
- Sister stations: Winnsboro, SC AM-silent

History
- First air date: September 1956
- Call sign meaning: We're, Fountain Inn, Simpsonville

Technical information
- Licensing authority: FCC
- Facility ID: 24530
- Class: D
- Power: 1,000 watts day 29 watts night
- Transmitter coordinates: 34°42′28″N 82°13′40″W

Links
- Public license information: Public file; LMS
- Webcast: www.wfisradio.webs.com

WFIS (1600 AM) was a radio station broadcasting a News Talk Information format to the Fountain Inn/Simpsonville, South Carolina, United States, area. The station was last owned by Timeless Media, Inc.

In 1956, the station went on the air with Fountain Inn-Simpsonville Enterprises INC. It was founded by Melvin Younts the original owner was LeRoy Hamilton with 9 local investors from the Fountain Inn-Simpsonville Community. The station licensed at 1600AM was originally licensed with a power of 50,000 watts but local investors though it too much expensive so the FCC offered 5,000 watts and again too much expense, so WFIS was given 1,000 watts in 1956. In 1970, the corporation purchased a weekly newspaper, The Tribune Times which was then located in Mauldin and struggling to stay in business they re-co-located it with the radio station facility on 1314 North Main Street then later the station was moved next door to 1318 North Main Street in Fountain Inn. WFIS won 5 Small Market Radio Station awards with the South Carolina Broadcasters Association. In 1987, the newspaper was sold to Multi-Media INC which owned The Greenville News and then both were sold to Gannett INC the owner of USA Today Newspapers. In 1988, WFIS was sold to Steven D Blair (from Kentucky), and Golden Strip Broadcasting INC was formed. In 1999, Joe LaStringer (AKA Super Joe) purchased WFIS for $199,000 and it was run until it sold in 2013. WFIS won 4 Best of the Upstate Awards, The South Carolina Broadcasters Association STAR Award for Public Service Announcement "Crime Solutions". It broadcast Hillcrest Sports but notably the 94-0 Lady Rams Softball run which was the longest winning streak in all of high school sports in South Carolina High School League History Which Super Joe was Voice of the Rams! WFIS signed off the air after 57 years Broadcasting to the Golden Strip Community at Noon December 31, 2013. The last song played was the Star-Spangled Banner by the Gaither Vocal Band after LaStringer told the history of the station.

On January 2, 2014, the station licensee was surrendered to the Federal Communications Commission (FCC) for cancellation. The licensee indicated that the surrender was related to their pending application to increase the broadcast power of co-owned station WTZQ in Henderson, North Carolina. On January 3, 2014, the FCC cancelled the station license.

== Translators ==
WFIS was relayed by an FM translator in Fountain Inn, to improve coverage in areas of the community where reception was poor: First on Frequency 105.5FM (later turned into WCCP-Clemson) then co broadcast WFIS 1600AM on 94.9FM.

Call sign	Frequency	City of license	FID	ERP (W)	Class	FCC info
W235BM	94.9 FM	Fountain Inn, SC	144201	150	D	LMS
