= WDOG-FM =

Radio station

Coordinates: 33.023°N 81.333°W

- Allendale, South Carolina; United States
- Broadcast area: Allendale, South Carolina
- Frequency: 93.5 MHz
- Branding: Big Dog Radio

Programming
- Format: Country music

Ownership
- Owner: Good Radio Broadcasting, Inc.

History
- First air date: January 1, 1966
- Call sign meaning: Big DOG Radio

Technical information
- Licensing authority: FCC
- Facility ID: 24620
- Class: A
- ERP: 6,000 watts
- HAAT: 91 meters

Links
- Public license information: Public file; LMS
- Website: bigdogradio.com

WDOG-FM (93.5 MHz) is a country music radio station in Allendale, South Carolina. During the day, it plays country from the past and present, as well as southern rock. At night, it plays urban contemporary music

WDOG-FM has South Carolina Gamecocks radio coverage, while WDOG-AM has the Clemson Tigers football.
