= Bridge (disambiguation) =

A bridge is a structure built so that a transportation route can cross above an obstacle.

- List of bridges
- Category:Bridges

Bridge may also refer to:

== Arts, entertainment, and media ==
=== Card games ===
- Bridge whist or straight bridge, derived from whist
- Auction bridge, a further derivation popular in the early 20th century
- Contract bridge, the modern form of the game
  - Two main variants:
    - Duplicate bridge, in which the same set of deals are played by all competitors
    - Rubber bridge, the basic game, where two partnerships play until one has won two games, called a rubber
  - Additional variants:
    - Chicago (bridge card game), played similarly to rubber bridge but a session is limited to four deals
    - Singaporean bridge or floating bridge, a re-invention of the game with very different rules

=== Films ===
- Bridge (1949 film), a Chinese film
- Bridge (1988 film), a US–USSR film
- Bridge (2020 film), an Indian Assamese-language drama

=== Literature ===
- Bridge, a 2014 novel by Patrick Jones

=== Music ===
==== Albums ====
- Bridge (Blues Traveler album)
- Bridge (Joey Cape album), 2008
- Bridge (Speed album)
- Bridge, a Japanese-language album by Hound Dog
- Red House Painters (Bridge), the third album by Red House Painters, often referred to as the Bridge album

==== Songs ====
- "Bridge" (song), by Queensrÿche
- "Bridge", by Holly Herndon and Martine Syms on Proto
- "Bridge over Troubled Water" (song), a hit song by Simon & Garfunkel

==== Other music ====
- Bridge (music), an interlude that connects two parts of a song
- Bridge Records, Inc., a record label

=== Musical instruments ===
- Bridge (instrument), the device that anchors the strings to or holds the strings above the body of a stringed instrument
  - 3rd bridge, an additional bridge added to a stringed instrument

=== Other arts, entertainment, and media ===
- Bridge Carson, a Power Rangers character
- Bridge (studio), a Japanese animation studio
- W281BE, a radio station licensed to Fort Mill, South Carolina, US called 104.1 the Bridge
- Bridge (sculpture), a public art work by Peter Flanary, in Milwaukee, Wisconsin, US
- Bridge (Shachtman), a sculpture by Stephen Shachtman, in Denver, Colorado, US
- Bridge (web series), a Maldivian comedy drama series by Amjad Ibrahim
- Bridge Theatre, a performing arts theater near Tower Bridge in London, England

== Fitness and sports ==
- Bridge (exercise) or gymnastic bridge, most commonly, the balancing of the body on the hands and feet
- Bridge (grappling), in wrestling, a move intended to dislodge an opponent in top control
- Mechanical bridge, a piece of cue sports equipment

== Maritime ==
- Bridge (nautical), the area of a ship from which it is commanded
- Bridge-class stores ship, a class of ship
- Bridge-class OBO carrier, a class of ship
- SS Empire Bridge or SS Bridge, an Empire ship
- USS Bridge, several US Navy ships of the name

== People ==
- Bridge (surname)
- Bridge (musician), American singer, songwriter and producer

== Places ==
- Bridge (City of London ward), a ward in the City of London, England
- Bridge (Redbridge ward), a ward for Redbridge London Borough Council, Greater London, England
- Bridge, Kent, in Kent, England
- Bridge, Oregon, in Oregon, US
- Bridge (crater), in the Hadley–Apennine region of the Moon
- Bridge Ward, Ipswich, Suffolk, England
- Bridge of Allan, a number of places in Scotland
- Bridge River, a river in British Columbia, Canada
- Bridge River Cones, a group of volcanoes in British Columbia, Canada
- Bridge City (disambiguation)

== Science, technology, and mathematics ==
=== Chemistry ===
- Bridge (chemical), an unbranched chain of atoms or an atom or a covalent bond connecting two bridgeheads in a polycyclic molecule
- A bridging ligand in inorganic chemicals
- A disulfide bridge found in proteins
  - Salt bridge (protein) or salt bond, in protein chemistry, chemical bonds between positively and negatively charged side-chains of proteins
  - Salt bridge, a laboratory device used to connect the oxidation and reduction half-cells of a galvanic cell (electrochemical cell)

=== Computing ===
- Adobe Bridge, digital asset management software
- Bridge pattern, a computer science design used to separate an abstraction and its actual implementation
- Network bridge, computer networking device that creates a single, aggregate network from multiple communication networks
- Northbridge (computing) and Southbridge (computing), two chips in the core logic chipset architecture on a PC motherboard
- Protocol bridge, an electronics device or piece of software that translates from one communications protocol or programming API to another

=== Electronics ===
- Bridge circuit
  - Bridge rectifier, a circuit for converting alternating current to direct current
  - H-bridge, a circuit which enables DC electric motors to be run forwards or backwards
  - Wheatstone bridge, a circuit for comparing resistors, capacitors or inductors to high standards of accuracy

=== Mathematics ===
- Glossary of graph theory § bridge; either an edge of a graph, a subgraph related to another subgraph, or a path related to a cycle, meeting a certain property
  - Edge of a graph: bridge (graph theory), isthmus, cut-edge, or cut arc, an edge whose removal disconnects a graph
- Brownian bridge, in probability theory, the conditional distribution of a process pinned both at the origin and at the end point

=== Medicine ===
- Bridge (dentistry), a fixed prosthesis used to replace missing teeth
- Myocardial bridge, a heart defect
- Nasal bridge, the upper, bony part of the nose
- Bridge therapy

=== Other uses in science and technology ===
- Natural bridge, a rock formation where an arch has formed with an opening underneath
- Bridge camera, generally considered to fill the niche between single-lens reflex (SLR) and compact point-and-shoot cameras
- British Mid-Ocean Ridge Initiative

== Other uses ==
- Bridge (hill), a classification of British hills
- Bridge (interpersonal), in social networks, a relationship that acts as a communication channel between different groups
- Bridge loan, a short-term loan to cover a gap in time until a new long-term financing is realised
- Bridge piercing, insertion of jewelry through the skin on the bridge of the nose
- Bridge program (higher education)
- Bridge Summit, an international conference and trade show, based in the United Arab Emirates

== See also ==
- Bridges (disambiguation)
- Bridging (disambiguation)
- The Bridge (disambiguation)
- "A bridge":
  - Abridge, a village in Essex, England
  - Abridgement or abridgment, a shortened version of a creative work
- "Bridge to ...":
  - Bridge to Nowhere (disambiguation)
  - Bridge to Terabithia (disambiguation)
