= The Bridge =

The Bridge may refer to:

== Art, entertainment and media ==
=== Art ===
- The Bridge (sculpture), a 1997 sculpture in Atlanta, Georgia, US
- Die Brücke (The Bridge), a group of German expressionist artists
- The Bridge (M. C. Escher), a lithograph print by M. C. Escher

=== Books and publications ===
- "The Bridge" (short story), a short story by Franz Kafka written in 1916 and published posthumously in 1931
- "The Bridge" (poem), a 1930 modernist poem by Hart Crane
- Die Brücke (novel) (The Bridge), a 1958 West German anti-war novel by Manfred Gregor
- The Bridge (magazine) (1964–1972), Australian Jewish quarterly
- The Bridge (Banks novel), published in 1986 by Iain Banks
- The Bridge (Gandolfo novel), 2018, by Enza Gandolfo
- The Bridge (short story collection), published in 1986 by Zayd Mutee' Dammaj
- The Bridge: The Life and Rise of Barack Obama, a 2010 biography
- The Bridge, a 1986 fantasy novel by Jeri Massi
- The Bridge, a 1991 horror novel by John Skipp and Craig Spector
- The Bridge, a 2001 novel by Doug Marlette
- The Bridge, a 2012 romance novel by Karen Kingsbury

=== Film and TV ===
==== Films ====
- De brug (The Bridge), a 1928 documentary short directed by Joris Ivens, of a vertical lift railway bridge
- The Bridge (1929 film), a short silent film directed by Charles Vidor
- Die Brücke (film) (The Bridge), a 1959 World War II film directed by Bernhard Wicki based on the novel of the same name
- The Bridge (1969 film) (also called Most), directed by Yugoslav director Hajrudin Krvavac
- The Bridge (1992 film), based on the novel by Maggie Hemingway
- The Bridge (1999 film), directed by Gérard Depardieu and Frédéric Auburtin
- Most (2003 film), directed by Bobby Garabedian, written and produced by William Zabka
- The Bridge (2004 film), a short film directed by Guy Édoin
- The Bridge (2006 documentary film), a documentary about individuals who died by suicide at the Golden Gate Bridge in 2004
- The Bridge (2006 drama film), a fictional story of involvement and disillusionment with Scientology
- Karen Kingsbury's The Bridge (2016 Hallmark Channel film), based on the 2012 novel The Bridge by Karen Kingsbury
- The Bridge (2017 film), directed by Kunle Afolayan

==== Television ====
- The Bridge (2005 TV series), an American documentary television series and community show chronicling old-school hip hop on NYCTV
- The Bridge (Canadian TV series), a 2010 Canadian police drama television series
- The Bridge (2011 TV series), a Danish–Swedish police television drama of four series (2011–2018)
  - The Bridge (2013 TV series), a 2013 American series based on the Danish–Swedish television series
  - The Bridge (Russian TV series), a 2017 Russian series based on the Danish–Swedish television series
  - The Bridge (2018 TV series), a 2018 Malaysian series based on the Danish–Swedish television series
- "The Bridge" (Agents of S.H.I.E.L.D.), an episode
- "The Bridge" (The Handmaid's Tale), an episode
- "The Bridge" (The Walking Dead), an episode
- "Chapter Seven: The Bridge", Stranger Things episode
- El Puente (TV series) ("The Bridge"), a 2017 Spanish reality television series, adapted for many other countries

=== Music ===
==== Artists ====
- The Bridge (band), a jam band from Baltimore, Maryland, US
- The Bridgeheads, a Slovak band formerly called The Bridge

==== Albums ====
- The Bridge (Sonny Rollins album), 1962
- The Bridge, a 1979 album by Thomas Leer and Robert Rental
- The Bridge (Billy Joel album), 1986
- The Bridge: A Tribute to Neil Young, 1989 anthology album
- The Bridge (Ace of Base album), 1995
- The Bridge (Letter Kills album), 2004
- The Bridge (Concept of a Culture), a 2009 album by Grandmaster Flash
- The Bridge (Melanie Fiona album), 2009
- The Bridge (Sting album), a 2021 album

==== Songs ====
- "The Bridge" (Deane Waretini song), 1981
- "The Bridge" (Elton John song), 2006

=== Radio ===
- The Bridge (Sirius XM), a satellite radio channel devoted to soft rock music
- KTBG, a listener supported radio station in Warrensburg, Missouri, US, known as The Bridge
- Black Country Radio, a community radio station in England, formerly known as 102.5 The Bridge
- W281BE, a radio station licensed to Fort Mill, South Carolina, US called 104.1 the Bridge

=== Other art and entertainment ===
- The Bridge (video game), 2013

== Places ==
- The Bridge (Warsaw), a skyscraper in Warsaw, Poland
- Die Brücke (institute), an institute founded in Munich, Germany
- Stamford Bridge (stadium), home of Chelsea Football Club in England, often referred to as "The Bridge"
- Sixmilebridge, County Clare, Ireland, a village, sometimes informally called 'the Bridge'
- Queensbridge Houses, a public housing development in Queens, New York in the US, often informally called 'the Bridge', especially in hiphop

== Other uses ==
- The Bridge to Total Freedom, a concept in Scientology, sometimes abbreviated to simply "The Bridge"
- The Bridge (Croatia), political party
- The BRIDGE, a library of the University of Toronto
- The Bridge (brand), an Italian premium leather goods brand

== See also ==
- Bridge (disambiguation)
- Bridges (disambiguation)
