= Bridges (disambiguation) =

Bridges are structures built to provide a transportation route to cross above an obstacle.

- List of bridges
- Category:Bridges
- Category:Lists of bridges

Bridges may also refer to:

== Places ==
In the United Kingdom

- Bridges Community Centre, housed in Drybridge House, Monmouth, Wales
- Bridges, Shropshire, a hamlet near Ratlinghope
- Bridges, Cornwall
- The Bridges, a shopping centre, in Sunderland, England

Elsewhere

- The Bridges, Calgary, a development in Bridgeland, Calgary
- Bridges, Queensland, a locality in Australia
- Bridges, Ohio, a community in the United States
- Bridges (restaurant), a restaurant in New York City

== People ==
- Bridges (surname)
- Bridges (cricketer, born 1780s), Homerton Cricket Club player
- Bridges (cricketer, born 1790s), Cambridge Town Club player
- Baron Bridges, a title in the Peerage of the United Kingdom
- Teddy Bridges, a fictional character in the American political drama Commander in Chief

== TV and entertainment ==
- Bridges (puzzle), AKA chopsticks, Japanese: 橋をかけろ, romanized: Hashi o kakero, lit. 'build bridges!'
- "Bridges", an episode in the TV drama Fairly Legal
- Bridges TV, a Muslim television channel
- Bridges, a 2006 play by Patrick Jones (poet)

== Music ==
- The Bridges (band), a U.S. rock band
- Bridges (band), a Norwegian band, predecessor to the band a-ha

=== Albums ===
- Bridges (Jets Overhead album), 2006
- Bridges (Gil Scott-Heron and Brian Jackson album), 1977
- Bridges (Moka Only and Ayatollah album), and the title track, 2012
- Bridges (Lynn Anderson album), 2015
- Bridges (Cavo album), 2016
- Bridges (John Williams album), 1979
- Bridges (Sonny Seeza album), 2016
- Bridges (Joe album), 2014
- Bridges (Josh Groban album), 2018
- Bridges (Calum Scott album), 2022
- Bridges (Steve Lukather album), 2023
- Bridges (Jo Dee Messina album), 2026
- Bridges, album by Dianne Reeves 1999
- Bridges, album by Bill Staines 1984
- Bridges, album by Mary Flower 2009

=== Songs ===
- "Bridges" (Milton Nascimento song), 1967
- "Bridges" (Broods song), 2014
- Bridges (Alika song), 2022
- "Bridges", a song by Destiny's Child from the album Destiny's Child, 1998
- "Bridges", a song by Neurosis from the album The Eye of Every Storm, 2004
- "Bridges", a song by Reflections from the album Exi(s)t, 2014
- "Bridges", a song by Rise Against from the album The Black Market, 2014
- "Bridges", a song by Fifth Harmony from the album Fifth Harmony, 2017
- "Bridges", a song by Au5 and Linney from the album Bridges Between, 2023
- "Bridges", a 2012 song by Transparent

== Other uses ==
- Bridges, a general purpose Hewlett Packard Enterprise system

== See also ==
- Bridge (disambiguation)
