= Floating bridge =

Floating bridge may refer to:

== Bridges that float on water ==
- Pontoon bridge
- Submerged floating tunnel
- Vlotbrug, a design of retractable pontoon bridge used in the Dutch province of North Holland
- Floating Bridge, Dubai

== Ferries ==
- A cable ferry, especially one designed by British civil engineer James Meadows Rendel
  - Cowes Floating Bridge
  - Torpoint Ferry
  - Woolston Floating Bridge

== Other uses ==
- In music, a type of bridge (instrument)
  - Fender floating bridge
- Singaporean bridge, a card game also known as floating bridge

== See also ==
- List of pontoon bridges
