= WLCM (South Carolina) =

Radio station in Lancaster, South Carolina (1951–1992)

WLCM was a radio station licensed to Lancaster, South Carolina. It operated on 1360 kHz with a power of 1,000 watts, daytime, non-directional. The call letters were chosen in honor of Springs Industries, the largest employer in the town, and represent the slogan, "World's Largest Cotton Mill."

== History ==
WLCM signed on the air November 26, 1951. Owned by the Royal Broadcasting Company, it broadcast from studios at 103 South Catawba Street in Lancaster. The owners at sign-on were Charles Connelly Jr and William Henry Belk Simpson. Later, Thomas Eugene Baker bought Simpson's interest in the station. In July 1964, a sister FM station joined it when WLCM-FM 107.1 (later WPAJ) signed on (it is now WRHM). Station Managers over the years were Faris Giles, Barry Medlin, Joe Dorton, Gene Baker, and James Knight. Notable on-air personalities were Giles, Medlin, Dorton, Knight, Doug Llewelyn ("The People's Court"), Glenn Hamrick, Joanne McManus, Bill Griffin, Lynn Phillips, Claude White, Boyce Williams, Steve Hall, Heath Newman, Wayne Medlin, Mel Melton, Wendell Rowell, Sager Powell, and Easy Gwynn.

In 1987, WLCM and WPAJ were purchased by Our Three Sons Broadcasting, owners of WRHI AM in nearby Rock Hill, South Carolina. The new owners moved the FM to Rock Hill and sold WLCM to a broadcast group headed by former WBT announcer Bill Curry. Following the removal of its FM signal, the station was not profitable and ceased operations in 1992. The station's tower still exists and is a landmark in the town of Lancaster.

After, the protection contours for WLCM were removed, several stations improved their service areas by either changing frequencies (WADE moved from 1210 to 1340, adding nighttime service) or moving transmitter locations and increasing power (WGIV on 1370 moved from Gastonia to Pineville, and broadcasts with 19,000 watts daytime).
