= Niggemeyer =

Niggemeyer is a surname. Notable people with the surname include:

- Elisabeth Niggemeyer (1930–2025), a German photographer
- James Niggemeyer, an American police officer
- Maria Niggemeyer (1888–1968), a German Bundestag member
- Wilhelm Niggemeyer, a German soldier in the German Wehrmacht
