= Brian Estridge =

Brian Estridge, is the play-by-play broadcaster for the TCU Horned Frogs , known as the "Voice of the Frogs" for football and men's basketball broadcasts. He he is a Partner in Bowl Season Radio and serves the President of the broadcast company RedVoice Productions, LLC. In addition to his role as the "Voice of the Frogs", Estridge also serves as the President and CEO of Fort Worth Colonial Charities. From 2009 until July 2022, he also co-hosted WBAP's Morning News..

== Biography ==
Brian Estridge was born and raised in Kershaw, South Carolina. His career in broadcasting began at the age of 14 on WKSC-AM in Kersha. His first play-by-play experience came that same year with the broadcast of the 2A South Carolina state girls basketball championship game. He would also work for WLCM/WPAJ in Lancaster SC and WAZS radio in Summerville SC during his High School years, while also playing football for legendary Head Coach John McKissick and the Summerville Green Wave.

After graduating high school Estridge attended Appalachian State University where he majored in political science. After graduating college Estridge was hired by Appalachian State to call football and men's basketball. He was the Voice of the Mountainers from 1991-1996 and is credited with the creation of the award winning Appalachian Sports Network. In addition to the Appalachain Sports Network, he developed and hosted the Appalachian TV Coaches Shows featuring Jerry Moore and Tom Apke. He was the voice of the Miami RedHawks working with coaches Randy Walker and Charlie Coles 1996-1998. In 1998 TCU's athletic director Eric Hyman brought him to Fort Worth to be the voice of the Horned Frogs. As the voice of TCU, Estridge has won 14 Texas AP Play-by Play awards.

In 2001 ESPN Radio hired Estridge as one of their first hosts on the new mid-day show with Newy Scruggs while maintaining his duties with TCU. Estridge was moved to the afternoon slot where he would host with Randy Galloway. Estridge remained with Galloway until he was hired by WBAP to co-host their morning show in 2009 a show he would remain on until his retirement from daily radio in 2022.

Estridge resides in Fort Worth with his wife Becky and has two children.

== RedVoice, LLC ==
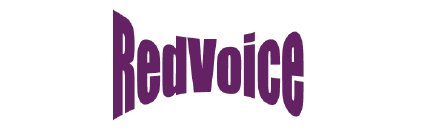
RedVoice logo

Estridge began RedVoice Productions, LLC in 2006 and acts as President of the company. which is headquartered in Fort Worth

In 2013 Estridge's ties with ESPN Radio allowed him to apply for the rights to broadcast the Heart of Dallas Bowl. The company was granted the broadcast rights and allowed to begin broadcasting the game in January 2014. In 2015 they acquired the rights to the Celebration Bowl, the Armed Forces Bowl, and the Bahamas Bowl.

== First Team Radio ==
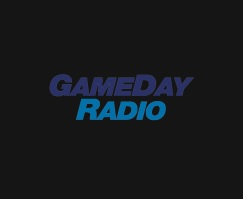
Gameday Radio logo (2017–18)

Bowlday Radio logo (2019)

First Team Radio logo (2020–present)

Bowl Season Radio Presented by First Team logo (2021–present)

In 2017 First Team Ventures was formed and the new company would begin broadcasting college bowl games under the name Gameday Radio. They also doubled their bowl production by adding the Famous Idaho Potato Bowl, the Frisco Bowl, the Gasparilla Bowl, and the Birmingham Bowl..

Inventory continued to increase in 2018 as First Team Ventures acquired the Las Vegas Bowl and expanded into college basketball by acquiring broadcast rights for the Myrtle Beach Invitational (semi's & championship), the Charleston Classic (championship), the NIT Tip-Off (all Brooklyn games), the AdvoCare Invitational (championship), the Wooden Legacy (championship), and the Diamond Head Classic (championship). As in 2017, all 2018 events were broadcast under the name Gameday Radio.

For 2019 the group name was changed to Bowlday Radio. Overall they kept their current broadcasts and added the Cure Bowl to their inventory.

In addition to Estridge, on-air talent has included Landry Burdine, Brian Hanni, Wyatt Thompson, Dave Hunziker, Andy Demetra, Randy McDaniel, Chris Mycoskie, Hans Olsen, Tim Murray, Paul Loeffler, Melanie Newman, Jamie Seh, Kevin Gehl, John Denton, Elvis Gallegos among others.

After reaching a marketing agreement with Bowl Season, the network is now branded as Coca-Cola Bowl Season Radio by First Team during the college football postseason and will produce 23 Bowl Games in 2027.
