= WRHM =

Radio station in Lancaster–Rock Hill, South Carolina

Coordinates: 34.860°N 80.800°W

- Lancaster, South Carolina; United States
- Broadcast area: Rock Hill, South Carolina
- Frequency: 107.1 MHz (HD Radio)
- Branding: Interstate 107

Programming
- Format: Country music; HD2: Contemporary Christian "104.1 The Bridge"; HD3: 90s hits "90s on 94.3"
- Affiliations: Compass Media Networks

Ownership
- Owner: Our Three Sons Broadcasting, LLP

History
- First air date: July 27, 1964
- Former call signs: WLCM-FM (1964–1974); WPAJ-FM (1974–1987)
- Call sign meaning: Rock Hill Music

Technical information
- Licensing authority: FCC
- Facility ID: 50776
- Class: A
- ERP: 2,400 watts
- HAAT: 159.8 meters
- Translators: 104.1 W281BE (Fort Mill, relays HD2); 94.3 W232AX (Rock Hill, relays HD3)
- Repeater: 107.3 WVSZ (Chesterfield)

Links
- Public license information: Public file; LMS
- Webcast: Listen Live; Listen Live (HD2); Listen Live (HD3)
- Website: interstate107.com 1041thebridge.com

WRHM (107.1 FM) is the flagship station of Interstate 107, the branding of two country music format stations in Rock Hill, South Carolina (107.1 WRHM) and Chesterfield, South Carolina (107.3 FM WVSZ).

== About ==
Officially licensed to Lancaster, South Carolina, Interstate 107 broadcasts from the WRHI/WRHM studios at 142 North Confederate Ave. near Downtown Rock Hill. WRHM is a country music formatted station, but also airs University of South Carolina football, basketball, and baseball, as well as NFL and college basketball games from Westwood One. Interstate 107 also carries NASCAR races from the Motor Racing Network and the Performance Racing Network.

WRHM operates at a relatively modest 2,400 watts from a somewhat short (by modern broadcasting standards) 524 ft (160 m) tower on the northern tip of Lancaster County. Despite this, WRHM provides at least secondary coverage to the southern portion of the Charlotte metro area, including much of Charlotte proper. This is because its transmitter is located near the North Carolina line. It thus provides much of the Charlotte area with a second option for Westwood One sports programming when Charlotte's WFNZ-FM is unable to air it due to programming conflicts. Additionally, it provides most of the South Carolina side of the Charlotte area with a clear signal for NASCAR, since Charlotte's WEND provides only secondary coverage to most of this area.

== Simulcast ==
WRHM programming is also simulcast on WVSZ, licensed to Chesterfield, South Carolina. WVSZ's main studio is that of WCRE AM in Cheraw, South Carolina.

== HD channel ==
The HD2 channel airs a Contemporary Christian format known as "The Bridge." It is relayed on translator W281BE.

== History ==
WRHM was called WLCM-FM and WPAJ when it was in Lancaster, and the format was soft adult contemporary. The station aired Atlanta Braves baseball.
