= Bridges (restaurant) =

Restaurant in New York City

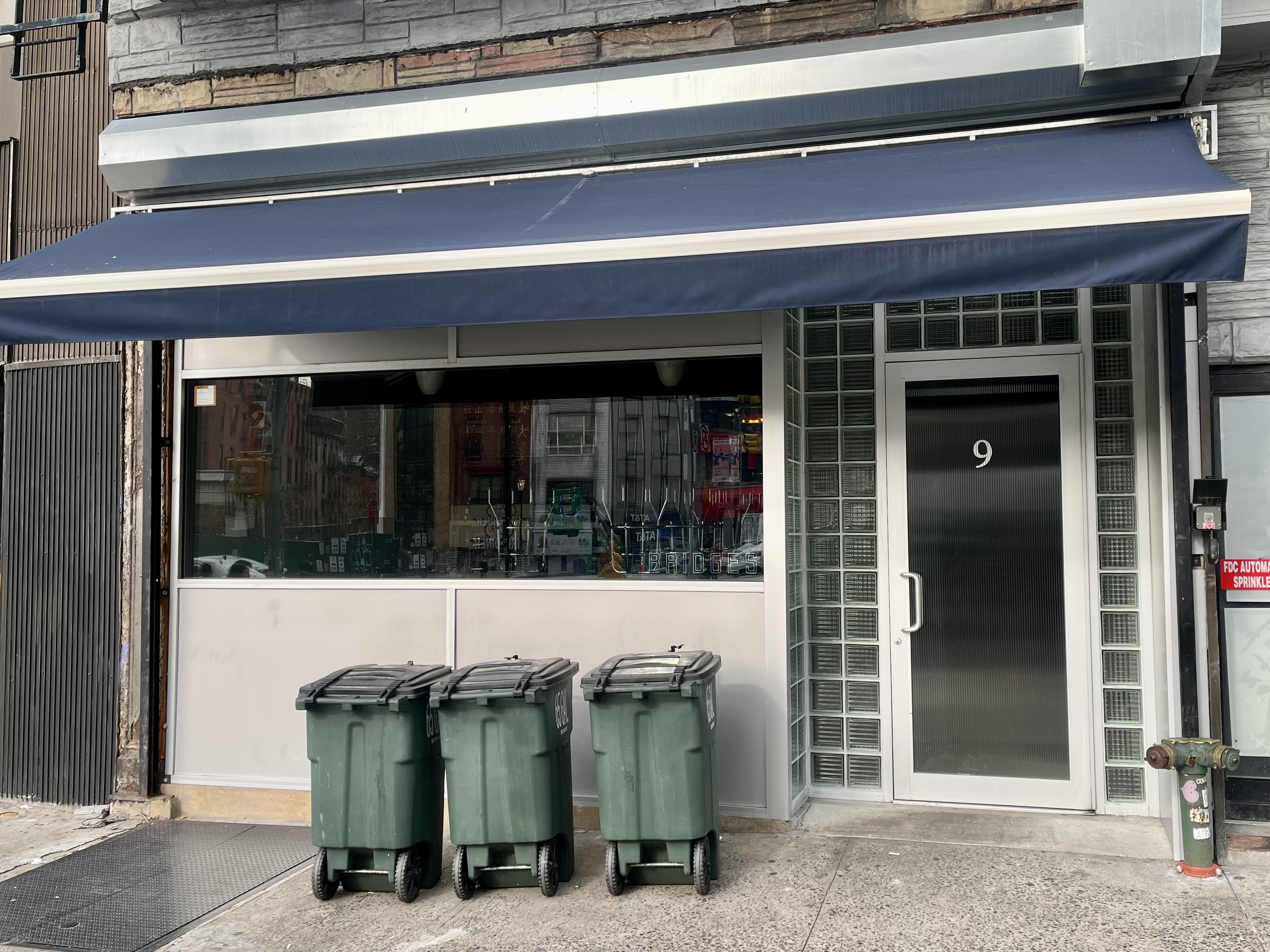
- The restaurant's exterior in 2025
- Interactive map of Bridges

Restaurant information
- Established: September 2024
- Head chef: Sam Lawrence
- Food type: European Bistro
- Rating: (Michelin Guide)
- Location: 9 Chatham Square, New York, New York, United States
- Coordinates: 40°42′50″N 73°59′53″W
- Seating capacity: 62 (50 seats, 12 at the bar)
- Reservations: Required, outside of the bar and one table
- Website: www.bridges-nyc.com

Bridges is a Michelin-starred restaurant located at Chatham Square in the Chinatown neighborhood of Manhattan in New York City. The restaurant opened in September 2024 and serves seasonal small plates influenced by European bistros along with an eclectic, mostly European, wine selection. The head chef, Sam Lawrence, used to work at Estela. Along with the Michelin star, the restaurant also received a rare 9.0 from The Infatuation.

== See also ==
- List of Michelin-starred restaurants in New York City
