= Wolf Jobst Siedler =

German writer and publisher (1926–2013)

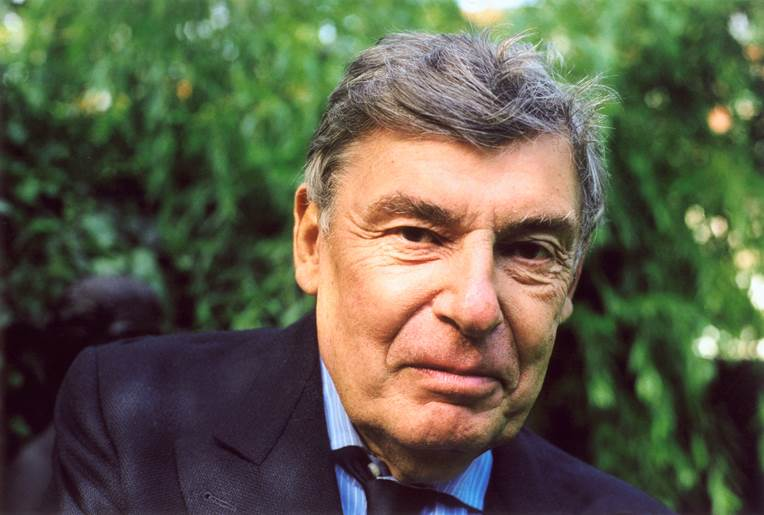
Wolf Jobst Siedler

Wolf Jobst Siedler (17 January 1926 – 27 November 2013) was a German publisher and writer.

== Life ==
Born in Berlin, he studied at the Freie Universität and worked as a journalist. His publishing house Wolf Jobst Siedler Verlag was bought in 1989 by Bertelsmann-Gruppe.

He has authored several books and wrote for many German publications including the Frankfurter Allgemeine Zeitung, the Süddeutsche Zeitung, Die Zeit, Die Welt and Junge Freiheit.

Siedler was interviewed about his assessments of Albert Speer in the docudrama Speer und Er.

== Notable works ==
- Die gemordete Stadt ("The Murdered City"), a classic critique of post-war German urban planning, with Elisabeth Niggemeyer and Gina Angress

== Honours ==
- Karl-Friedrich-Schinkel-Ring
- Ernst-Robert-Curtius-Preis
- Deutscher Nationalpreis (2002)
- Gerhard Löwenthal Prize, honorary prize

== Sources ==
- Clive James, Cultural Amnesia: Necessary Memories from History and the Arts (2007)
