= Elisabeth Niggemeyer =

German photographer (1930–2025)

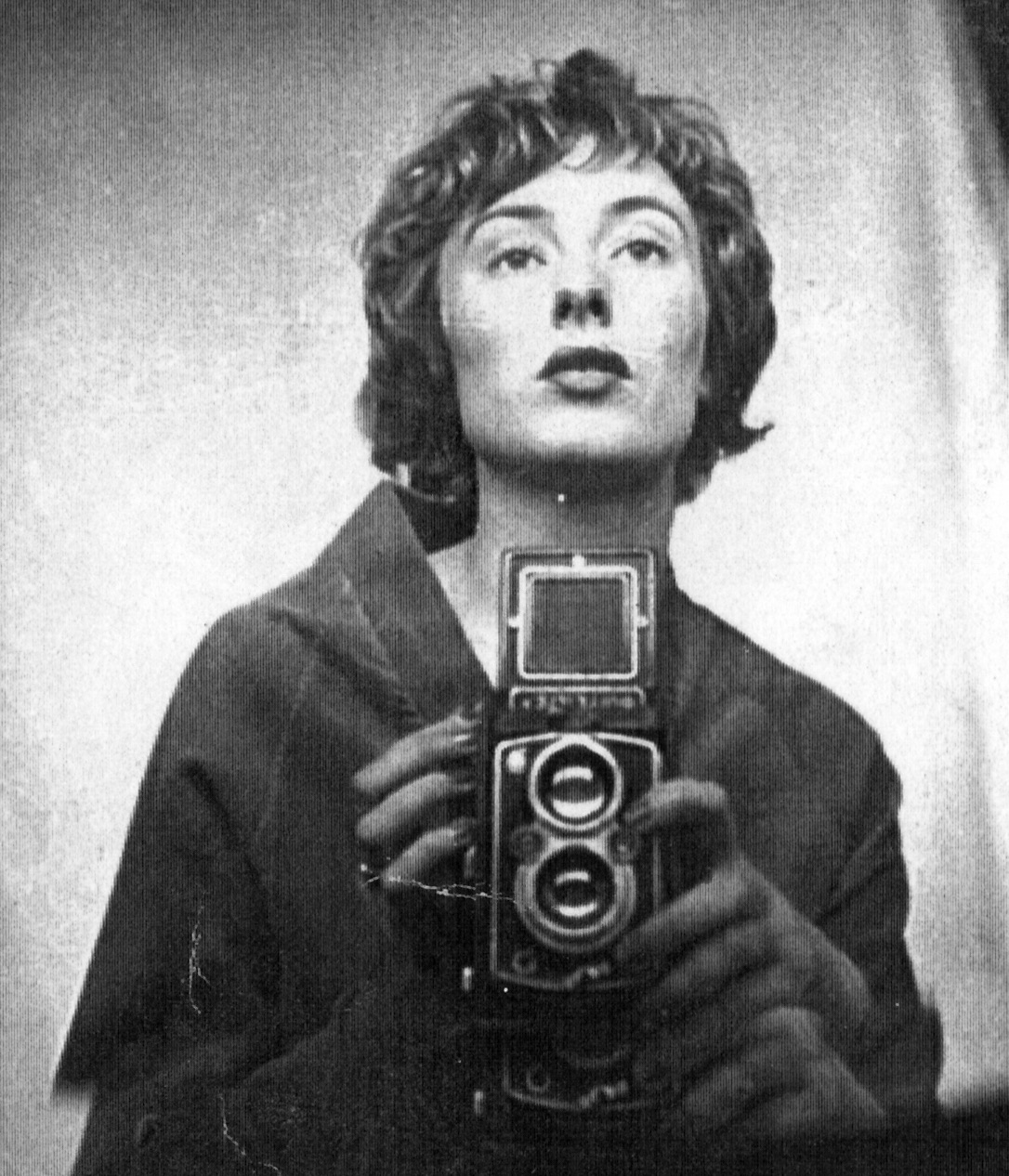
- Born: 23 June 1930; Bochum, Germany
- Died: 29 January 2025 (aged 94); Berlin, Germany
- Education: Bayerische Staatslehranstalt für Lichtbildwesen
- Notable work: Die gemordete Stadt

Elisabeth Niggemeyer (23 June 1930 – 29 January 2025) was a German photographer. Niggemeyer is best known as the photographer for Die gemordete Stadt ("The Murdered City"), a classic critique of post-war German urban planning, and for her work on children and pedagogy created in collaboration with Nancy Hoenisch.

== Background ==
Elisabeth Niggemeyer's parents ran a retail photo shop and laboratory in Bochum. After finishing school in 1950, she started vocational training as a photographer at the Bayerische Staatslehranstalt für Lichtbildwesen in Munich, following the wishes of her parents. She showed little interest in the technical aspects of photography, until she discovered her interest for photo reportage while covering Oktoberfest. After graduating in 1952, and a disappointing foray into fashion photography, Elisabeth Niggemeyer remained in Munich, working in a photo shop and taking pictures of urban scenery with her Rolleiflex camera during free time. Niggemeyer died on 29 January 2025, at the age of 94.

== Photographic work ==
=== City and urban life ===
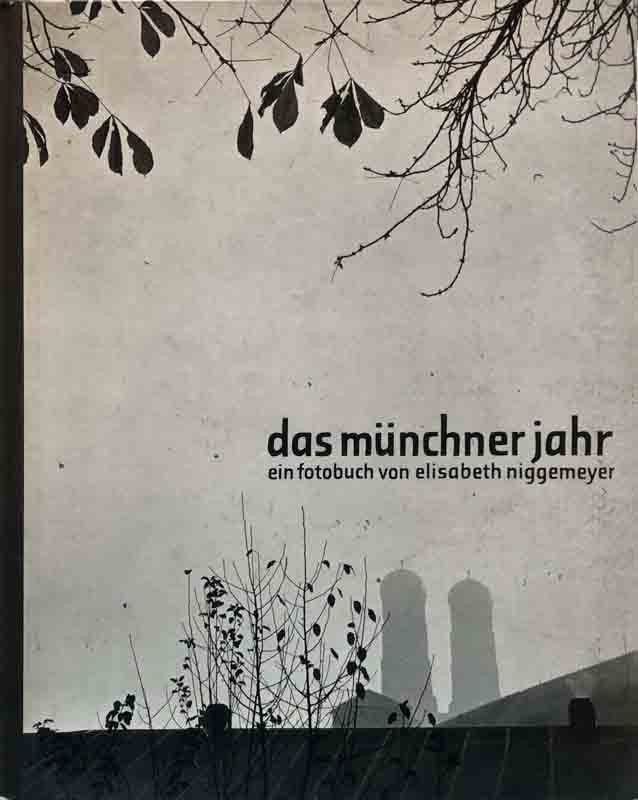

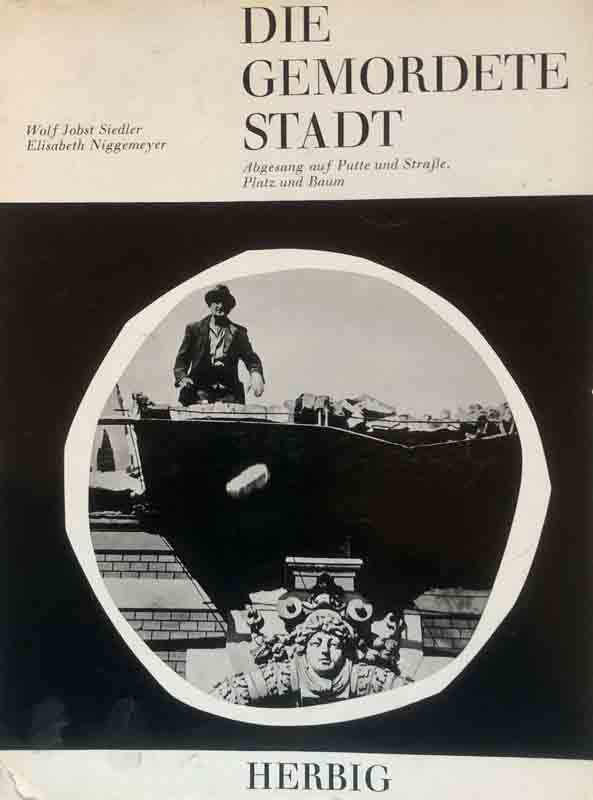

The Süddeutsche Zeitung printed one of her photos out large in the newspaper's weekend edition, prompting an assignment by Süddeutscher Verlag for the production of an entire book on Munich, das münchner jahr, 1955. She continued to publish city portraits in photo book format: London. Stadt, Menschen, Augenblicke in 1956, and Bonn im Bild, in 1957.

In 1958, Elisabeth Niggemeyer and her husband Peter Pfefferkorn moved to West Berlin, where she took pictures for reports in women's magazine Constanze and its successor Brigitte.

Friedrich Luft's review of her Munich book brought Niggemeyer's work to the attention of Berlin journalist Wolf Jobst Siedler, who was looking for a photographer to take pictures that illustrated his writings on contemporary city building. In 1965, Siedler, Niggemeyer and journalist Gina Angress jointly published Die gemordete Stadt ("The Murdered City"). In his essays, Siedler criticizes modern city building and urban renewal, which led to the demolition of entire neighborhoods built before World War I. These were replaced by monotonous apartment blocks visually bereft of any elements without functional purpose. What World War II had not fully accomplished, was now apparently completed and seized as an ongoing opportunity for standardization.

Elisabeth Niggemeyer's photos offer striking evidence thereof, confronting lush decorum found in Berlin's fin-de-siècle architecture with the dreariness of its contemporary neighborhoods. In the words of one critic, "the result was devastating."

While Niggemeyer's pictures visualize Siedler's lament, they are in turn amended by documentary text-bits Gina Angress compiled, and that sometimes achieve a comical, spiteful effect. Die gemordete Stadt, re-published in 1979 and 1993, has been called the most influential book on architecture in post-war Germany. Its effect has been linked to that of Jane Jacobs' The Death and Life of Great American Cities in the United States and Canada. The year after its initial publication, a film on the topic was produced by architectural critic Ulrich Conrads.

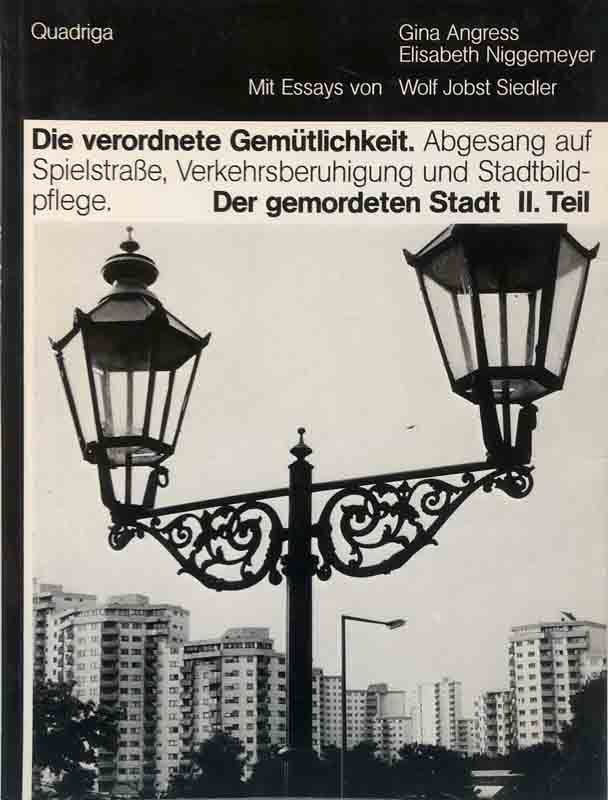

21 years later, in 1985, the three contributors edited a follow-up titled Die verordnete Gemütlichkeit (Mandatory Cosiness). This book reviews two decades since Die gemordete Stadt made its first public impact, years during which architecture and city-building shifted from modernism to historicism, a.k.a. post-modernism. Elisabeth Niggemeyer’s pictures aim to show that decorating modern cityscapes with copies of artifacts abolished thirty years ago makes for an out-of-place comeback, since the decor's environment was irrevocably lost.

From 2000, Niggemeyer occasionally lived in Paris, taking forays into the entire city while photographing for "Paris Puzzle", a series of paperback volumes each dedicated to one of the 20 arrondissements. They offer detailed and often collaged views of the city's architecture (2014/2021).

=== Photography and pedagogics ===
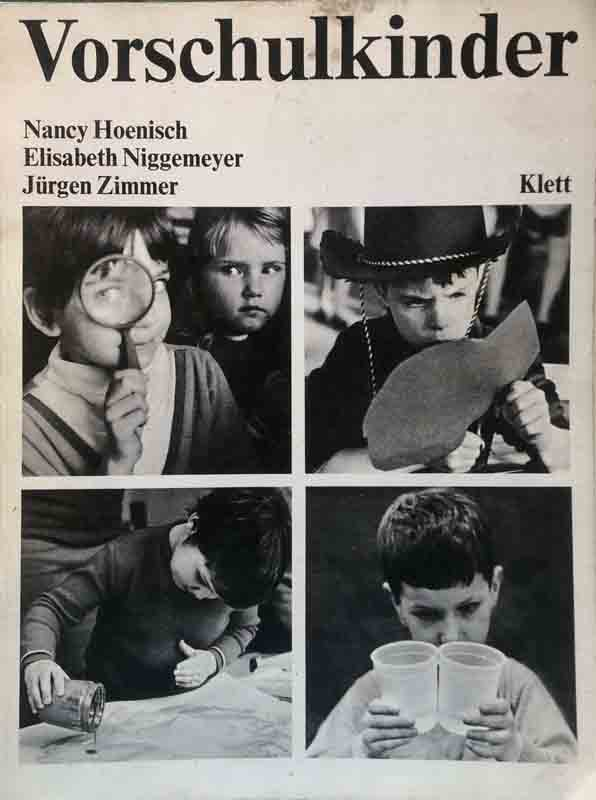

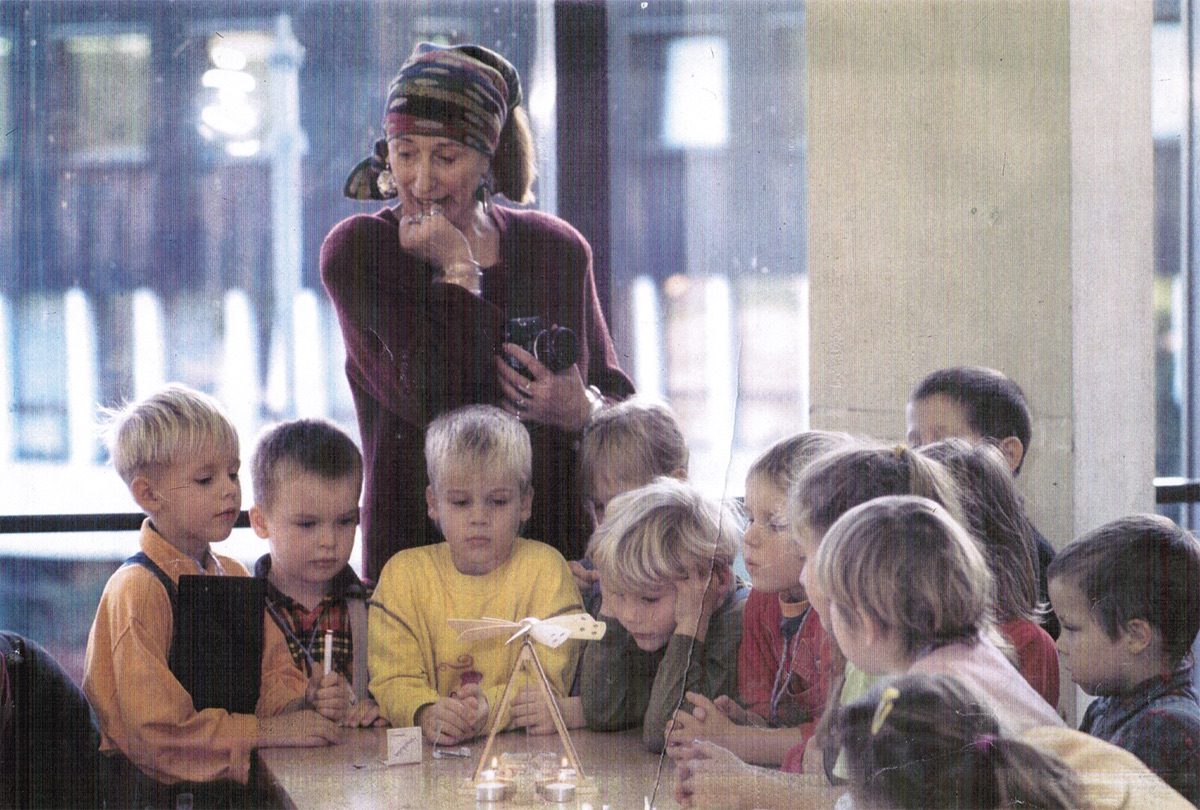

After marrying Peter Pfefferkorn, Elisabeth Niggemeyer gave birth to three children. In the early 1960s the family moved to Zehlendorf, a suburban district of West-Berlin, where the children, along with students and teachers from Germany and the U.S., attended the John-F.-Kennedy-School. Here, Elisabeth Niggemeyer met and made friends with American teacher Nancy Hoenisch and began taking pictures of children during preschool classes. These pictures turned out to be a key element of the book Vorschulkinder, published at Ernst-Klett-Verlag in 1969, in cooperation with Nancy Hoenisch and psychologist and educationist Jürgen Zimmer. The book was reprinted four times and became a classic of preschool pedagogics. Bridging kindergarten and elementary school, preschool teaching is shown as an attempt at enabling children to make hands-on first experiences of understanding, e.g., early science, while promoting children's independent thinking and assessment. In close cooperation with Antoinette Becker, Elisabeth Niggemeyer made more photo books on similar topics at Klett and Otto-Maier-Verlag Ravensburg, the latter publishing a book series dedicated to "Ich und die Welt" (Me and the World). The volumes address outstanding situations in the lives of children, e.g. a stay at the hospital, or school enrollment. The last books for and about children (e.g. Mathe-Kings, 2004) were again jointly produced with Nancy Hoenisch, again about preschool experiences, and were presented to children and grownups at action exhibitions.

=== Working method and characteristics ===
Elisabeth Niggemeyer says of herself, “I don't take photographs to make beautiful pictures, but I knew I was taking photographs because I wanted to communicate something. That was the decisive factor."[4]

In her early city portraits, the beauty of the city is definitely a theme. In its own way, it is also central to the two parts of the “Murdered City”. There, too, there are photos in a larger format that are reminiscent of the atmospherically or narratively dense Munich pictures. However, the photographer has expanded her spectrum to include a series of detailed architectural shots. Viewed together, the various image genres not only thematize the diversity of the architectural heritage, but also, for example, the inner-city retail trade and thus a quality of urban life. In “Paris Puzzle” it is still “the beautiful everyday”[5] that Elisabeth Niggemeyer is interested in, not least because its loss is imminent. Recognizing it requires attention. This is itself a theme in her pedagogical works, in which she shows the children's immersion in the playful learning process.

In Elisabeth Niggemeyer's work, photographic means of image reportage are alive and well, going back to the illustrated press of the 1920s and including the seemingly merely documentary depiction of details. In this tradition, photography goes far beyond an illustrative function and becomes at least as important as text. The layout plays a very important role in all of Niggemeyer's publications, including the collage of images, in which detailed images are repeatedly brought into a factual and social context through situational overall shots.

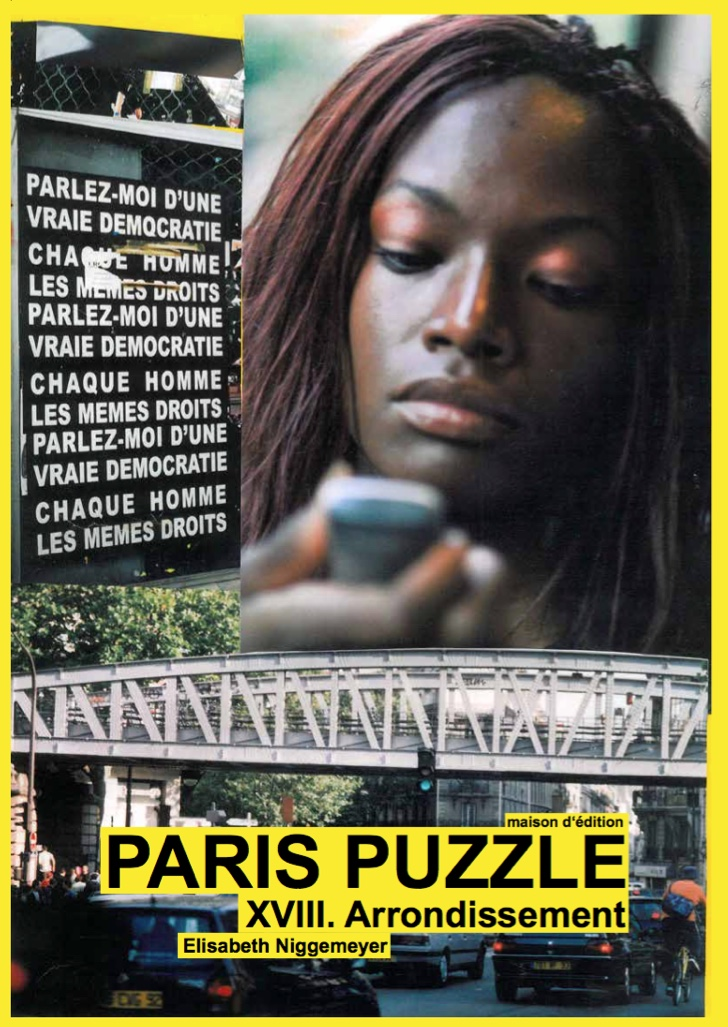

Elisabeth Niggemeyer has continued to simplify her photographic approach. She began with the medium format of the Rolleiflex, cropping and enlarging in the black and white laboratory. She soon came to 35mm photography via a Leica, the flexibility of which facilitated her work with children. In her more recent educational work and also in the urban photography in “Paris-Puzzle”, she used color films that she had developed and exposed in drugstores. In her work, photography is also a medium in the sense that its purely technical aspects completely fade into the background. Regardless of its technical and aesthetic quality, the focus is not on the individual image. Instead, it is subordinated to the context of the photo book and becomes a communicative element. This applies to Elisabeth Niggemeyer's photo books on architecture and cityscapes since the 1960s as well as to her educational works, in which she was able to combine her personal career aspirations with her routine mastery of photographic practice.

“I was able to familiarize myself with Paris by doing puzzles, so to speak, because all my many hundreds of photos are individually without meaning, without statement, just as they are individual pieces of a puzzle, but put together as pictures they show what is special to me, the beautiful everyday life of the twenty different worlds that make up the magic of the city..."

== Selected works ==
- Elisabeth Niggemeyer, Walter Foitzick: Das Münchner Jahr. Süddeutscher Verlag, Munich 1955, S. 106.
- Elisabeth Niggemeyer, mit Texten von Hilde Spiel: London. Süddeutscher Verlag, Munich 1956
- Elisabeth Niggemeyer, Texte Erich Kuby: Bonn im Bild. Süddeutscher Verlag, Munich 1957
- Wolf Jobst Siedler, Elisabeth Niggemeyer, Gina Angress: Die gemordete Stadt, Abgesang auf Putte u. Straße, Platz u. Baum. Herbig, Munich 1964, S. 192.
- Nancy Hoenisch, Elisabeth Niggemeyer, Jürgen Zimmer: Vorschulkinder. Ernst Klett Verlag, Stuttgart 1969
- Antoinette Becker, Elisabeth Niggemeyer: Ich bin jetzt in der Schule, Reihe: Ich und die Welt. Otto Maier, Ravensburg 1972, ISBN 3-473-33401-4
- Nancy Hoenisch, Elisabeth Niggemeyer: Heute streicheln wir den Baum, Naturerfahrungen mit Pflanzen, Tieren, d. Wetter u.d. Erde. Otto Maier, Ravensburg 1981, ISBN 3-473-60446-1
- Wolf Jobst Siedler, Elisabeth Niggemeyer, Gina Angress: Die verordnete Gemütlichkeit, Abgesang auf Spielstraße, Verkehrsberuhigung u. Stadtbildpflege – Gemordete Stadt II.Teil. Quadriga/Severin, Berlin 1985, ISBN 3-88679-125-4
- Jürgen Zimmer, Elisabeth Niggemeyer: Macht die Schule auf, lasst das Leben rein, von d. Schule zur Nachbarschaftsschule. Beltz, Basel 1986
- Nancy Hoenisch, Elisabeth Niggemeyer: Mathe-Kings, junge Kinder fassen Mathematik an. Verlag Das Netz, Berlin 2004, ISBN 3-937785-11-6
- Nancy Hoenisch, Elisabeth Niggemeyer: Mein Körperheft : ich staune in mich selbst. Verlag Das Netz, Berlin 2008, ISBN 978-3-937785-74-5

== Exhibitions ==
- "Heute streicheln wir den Baum" – Kinder und ihre Erfahrungen mit der Natur, Fotoausstellung und Einladung zu Spielaktionen in the "Akademie der Künste Berlin", Nancy Hoenisch, Elisabeth Niggemeyer, Berlin, June 1981
- "HALLO ERDE; WIR SIND DA!" im FEZ, Berlin Wuhlheide, 1989
- "Mal anders Essen, Das Vollwertland entdecken" – Ausstellung mit Aktion im FEZ, Berlin, May 1991
- "HALLO KINDER, SEID ERFINDER" – Abenteuer mit dem Alltäglichen im FEZ, Wulheide, Berlin 2001
- "MATHE-KINGS" – Junge Kinder fassen Mathematik an, in der Kita am Halleschen Tor, Berlin, 2004
- "ICH STAUNE IN MICH SELBST HINEIN" WILLY-BRANDT-Haus, Berlin, 2007
- "Elisabeth Niggemeyer. Munich – London – Bonn – Berlin, Fotografien 1957–64", Galerie argus fotokunst, Berlin, January 2007
