= Die gemordete Stadt =

1964 book on urban planning

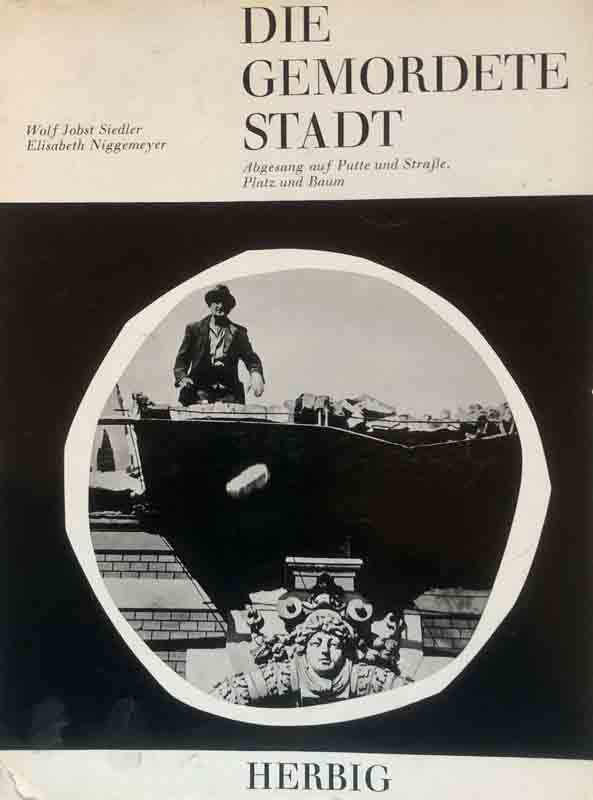

Die gemordete Stadt ("The Murdered City") is a classic critique of post-war German urban planning by journalists Wolf Jobst Siedler and Gina Angress and photographer Elisabeth Niggemeyer. It was originally published in 1964, and re-published in 1979 and 1993. It has been called the most influential book on architecture in post-war Germany, and its effect has been linked to that of Jane Jacobs' The Death and Life of Great American Cities in the United States and Canada.

The year after its initial publication, a film on the topic was produced by architectural critic Ulrich Conrads.

== Reviews and further reading ==
- "Die gemordete Stadt". Der Spiegel. No. 12/1964. 1964-03-17.
- "STÄDTEBAU, Durchsonnte Sünden". Der Spiegel. No. 23/1964. 1964-06-02.
- "Der Klassiker der Architektur-Kritik wird neu aufgelegt 'Die Gemordete Stadt'". Der Abend. Berlin. 1978-10-15.
- "Die Zweite Zerstörung Deutschlands, … Gemordete Stadt 15 Jahre später". Die Welt. 1979-01-04.
- "Giebelhäuser fielen für Betonklötze - Schon 1958 sah W.J.Siedler unwirtliche Städte voraus". Münchner Merkur. 1979-02-17.
- Siedler, Wolf Jobst (1985-03-31). "Vom Boulevard zur Spielstraße". Der Spiegel. No. 14/1985.
- Doris Stoisser (1985-07-30). "Stadt soll Stadt bleiben". Österreichs Frauenmagazin.
- "Masten, Schilder, Telefonzellen und Poller verstellen den Blick". Frankfurter Rundschau. 1985-09-07.
- "Die verordnete Gemütlichkeit ist gegen den Geist der Stadt". Berliner Morgenpost. 1985-09-08.
- Wiglav Droste (1985-10-12). "Stadtplanung: Die entvölkerte Ruhe". Die Tageszeitung.
- Bärbel Jäschke (1985-10-20). "Stadtplanung: Nippes für Metropolis". Deutsches Allgemeines Sonntagsblatt. No. 42.
- Günther Kühne (1985-10-27). "Mord an der Stadt geht weiter". Der Tagesspiegel.
- P.C.Mayer-Tasch (1985-11-02). "Die kleinen Ungeheuer". Süddeutsche Zeitung.
- "Die Zerschmückung der Städte". Der Spiegel. No. 49/1985. 1985-12-01.
- Schmidt, Bernd (1985-11-28). "Stadtplanung: Zuneigung zum Gestern". Tip-Berlin Magazin.
- Warnke, Stephanie (2010). "Zur Kontextualisierung eines 'Klassikers'. Wolf Jobst Siedlers und Elisabeth Niggemeyers Essay-Foto-Buch „Die gemordete Stadt"". In Vittorio Magnago Lampugnani/Katia/Frey/Eliana Perotti (ed.). Stadt und Text. Zur Ideengeschichte der Stadt und des Städtebaus im Spiegel theoretischer Schriften (18.–21. Jahrhundert). Berlin: Gebr. Mann. pp. 138–151.
- de Rudder, Steffen (2014). ""Die gemordete Stadt" Zum fünfzigjährigen Erscheinen eines Klassikers der Städtebau-Literatur". Forum Stadt. Esslingen: 135–144.
- Englert, Klaus (17 September 2008). "Die Unwirtlichkeit unserer Städte". Deutschlandfunk (in German).
