= Letter Kills =

American alternative rock band

- Also known as: LK
- Origin: Temecula, California
- Genres: Rock, post-hardcore, alternative rock
- Years active: 2002–2006, 2023-Present
- Label: Island
- Members: Matt Shelton; Timothy Cordova; Kyle Duckworth; Gene Louis; Cody Driggers
- Past members: Paul Remund; Dustin Lovelis
- Website: letterkillsofficial.com

Letter Kills is an alternative rock band from Southern California, formed in August 2002.

== History ==
Their first album, The Bridge, was released July 2, 2004.

Described by Alternative Press as “the greatest screamo band you’ve never heard of,” Letter Kills rose from the Temecula, California, desert in the early 2000s with a riff-heavy collection of alternative rock, ’80s hair-metal and punk rock. The band’s 2004 Island Def Jam debut, The Bridge, introduced Letter Kills on Fuse and MTV2 with the single “Don’t Believe,” on the Nintendo Fusion Tour alongside My Chemical Romance and in the pages of Rolling Stone.

== 2023 reunion ==
In 2023, Duckworth, vocalist Matt Shelton and guitarist Tim Cordova released the single “Right Where You Belong.” Co-produced by the band and Joey Bradford of The Used, “Right Where You Belong” was Letter Kills’ first new music since The Bridge.

== Discography ==
- The Bridge (2004)
