= Road to nowhere =

Road to nowhere may refer to:

== Highways ==
- Illinois Route 137, a section called the Amstutz Expressway in Waukegan, Illinois
- Lakeview Drive, the uncompleted North Shore Road at Fontana Lake reservoir, Great Smoky Mountains National Park, North Carolina
- Maryland Route 10 or the Arundel Expressway, Maryland
- Schuylkill Parkway, a freeway stub in Bridgeport, Pennsylvania
- U.S. Route 222, a section of freeway bypass north of Reading, Pennsylvania
- the access road to a proposed Gravina Island Bridge in Alaska; the bridge was never built
- a stretch of unused dual carriageway in Yate, England
- Unused highway

== Songs ==
- "Road to Nowhere", a song by Talking Heads
- "Road to Nowhere", a song by Ozzy Osbourne from the album No More Tears
- "Road to Nowhere", a song by Bullet for My Valentine on the deluxe edition of the album Scream Aim Fire
- "Road to Nowhere", a song by Anthem on their album Immortal
- "Road to Nowhere", a song by Lucie Idlout
- "Road to Nowhere", a song by Nat King Cole on his album I Don't Want to Be Hurt Anymore
- "A Road to Nowhere", a song by Gerry Goffin and Carole King, released as a single by King in 1966

== Other uses ==
- Max and Paddy's Road to Nowhere, a 2004 British comedy TV show
- Road to Nowhere (film), a 2010 American thriller film
- Road to Nowhere (book), a 2022 book by Paris Marx
- The Road to Nowhere (novel), a 1930 novel by Alexander Grin
- Road to Nowhere, 1993 novel by Christopher Pike
- a neighborhood of Iqaluit, Nunavut, Canada

== See also ==
- Bridge to Nowhere (disambiguation)
