= The Bridge (magazine) =

The Bridge was a quarterly magazine published in Sydney 1964–1972 by the Australian Jewish Quarterly Foundation.

Its editor was H. Brezniak elsewhere named Chaim Brezniak (1914 – July 1978), and contributors include Mark M. Braham, David Martin, Herz Bergner, Walter W. Stone, Frank Moorhouse, C. B. Christesen, Randolph Stow, and Leslie Rees.
