= Bridge (sculpture) =

Public art work in Milwaukee, Wisconsin

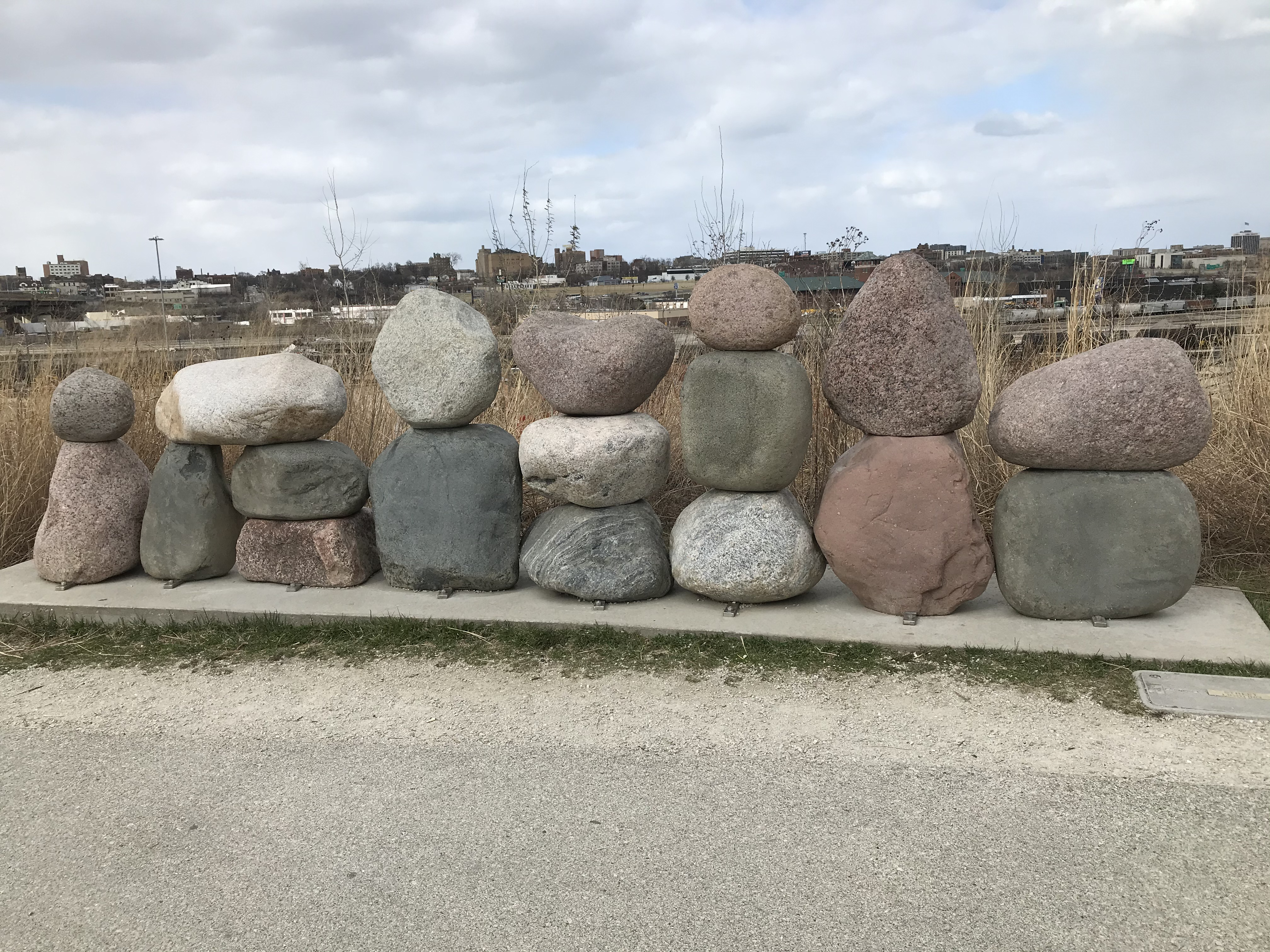
- Artist: Peter Flanary
- Year: 2012
- Type: glacial boulders and stainless steel
- Location: Hank Aaron State Trail; Milwaukee, Wisconsin; 43.028241°N 87.946562°W
- Owner: State of Wisconsin

Bridge is a public art work by artist Peter Flanary. It is located on the Hank Aaron State Trail in the Menomonee Valley south of downtown Milwaukee, Wisconsin. The sculpture was donated to the State of Wisconsin by the nonprofit Menomonee Valley Partners. The sculpture is located in Three Bridges Park near the bridge from Mitchell Park.

== Description ==
Bridge is a series of 20 large glacial boulders selected and assembled into a sculptural installation. The stones are fitted together and secured with stainless steel pins and epoxy. The average diameter of each boulder is two feet. The artist intended for the fitting and pinning of the boulders to "represent the idea of connection."
