= Bridge Summit =

Trade show

- Host country: United Arab Emirates
- Date: 8–10 December 2025
- Cities: Abu Dhabi
- Venues: Abu Dhabi National Exhibition Centre
- Participants: 60,000 (2025) from 132 countries
- Chair: Abdulla bin Mohammed bin Butti Al Hamed
- Website: bridgesummit.com

Bridge Summit is an international conference and trade show for the media, entertainment, and content industries, based in the United Arab Emirates. The summit combines a conference program with a marketplace format.

== History ==
The Bridge Summit was announced in September 2025 as part of the UAE's media innovation strategy. Abdulla bin Mohammed bin Butti Al Hamed was named Chairman of Bridge Summit. In September 2025, he met Elon Musk and invited him to participate in the inaugural edition.

In October 2025 Bridge signed an agreement with Meta, which committed to delivering sessions, workshops, and augmented and virtual reality experiences.

== BRIDGE Summit 2025 ==
The first edition was held from 8–10 December 2025 at the Abu Dhabi National Exhibition Centre. It hosted over 60,000 participants from 132 countries, including 1,200 CEOs, and featured over 300 activities, including panel discussions, workshops, and Master classes. Dedicated zones supported business matchmaking, co-production labs, and roundtable discussions. Meta also presented on-site technology showcases.

== Themes ==
The 2025 summit featured seven thematic tracks: Marketing, Media, Creator economy, Gaming, Music, Technology, and Picture (film, television, and online video). Cross-cutting topics included artificial intelligence in media, content economics, and distribution models.

== Notable attendees ==
- Arsène Wenger, FIFA’s Chief of Global Football Development
- Gerard Piqué, former Spanish international footballer
- Priyanka Chopra, Indian actress
- Mohamed Diab, Egyptian screenwriter
- Richard Teng, Binance CEO
- Alexis Ohanian, Reddit co-founder
- Gary Vaynerchuk, American businessman
- Idris Elba, English actor
- Bassem Youssef, Egyptian comedian
- Wyclef Jean, Haitian rapper
