= The Bridges =

The Bridges Shopping Centre

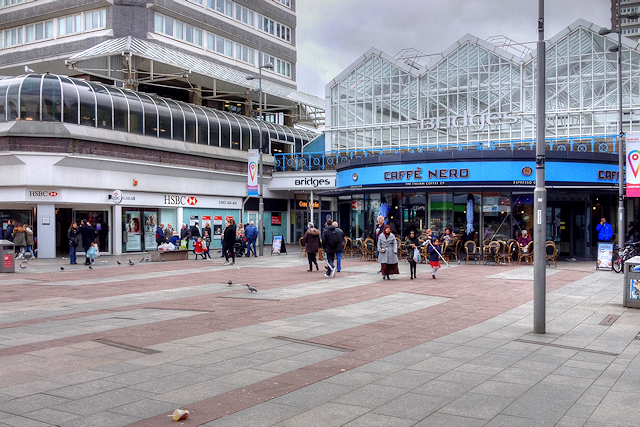
- The Bridges Shopping Centre pictured in 2016
- Location: City of Sunderland, England
- Coordinates: 54.905390°N 1.384500°W
- Address: Sunderland, SR1 3DR
- Opened: 1988
- Manager: Karen Eve
- Owner: Heron (1988-1993) Land Securities (1993-2014) AEW Europe (2014-2025) Evolve Estates (2025-present)
- Num. of stores: 79
- Num. of anchor tenants: 2 (Primark & TK Maxx)
- Floor area: 598,560 sq ft
- Parking: 900 parking spaces
- Website: http://www.thebridges-shopping.com/

The Bridges Shopping Centre, commonly known as ‘The Bridges’ is a shopping centre located in Sunderland, England. The centre was opened by Princess Royal, Anne in 1988.

The Bridges in 2020, with most of the stores closed due to the COVID-19 lockdown.

== Shops ==
The center comprises 79 stores, including 2 anchor tenants, Primark and TK Maxx. There are also 9 food outlets on site, ranging from coffee shops to cafes, including a Greggs Cafe & Esquires Coffee branch.

As a result of Debenhams entering administration, their anchor outlet at the center closed in May 2021, which reduced the total number of anchors from 3 to 2.

In December 2021, the supermarket chain Tesco confirmed they would be closing the Tesco Express store located within the center in Summer 2022. The store closed on 2 April 2022.

On 12 June 2025, a new Tesco Express store opened within the centre.

== Car parking ==
The shopping center offers over 900 parking spaces in 2 car parks, a multi-story car park, and a rooftop car park.

Both car parks operate with an hourly charge the majority of the time, with the following exceptions: Sundays & Bank Holidays have a single charge for parking during the day (8 AM-6 PM), and free parking is available Thursday Evenings between 5:30 PM & 9:00 PM.

The car park was open 24 hours a day until May 2017.

== Ownership ==
Heron International owned the centre, until it was sold to Land Securities in 1993, for a reported £39 million. A further sale took place in 2014, which resulted in clients of AEW Europe acquiring the centre for £153 million.

In May 2024, Evolve Estates, part of the M Core Group purchased the centre from AEW Europe for £24 million.

== Development ==
In 2000, the ‘old central bus station’, adjacent to the center was demolished and the land was acquired. This land was used to create a significant expansion that almost doubled the size of the center, and made it fully covered. Previously some areas of the centre were not covered, resulting in the centre having the nickname of ‘Windy City’.

In September 2010, Land Securities announced a £15 million development to build a 3-story (60,000sq ft) Primark store. The store later opened in November 2012.

In May 2020, Next expanded their store by over 4,000sq ft from 10,221sq ft to 14,710sq ft. This was achieved by acquiring an adjoining vacant unit. This allowed them to open a new childrenswear section and expand their existing homewares selection.

== Transport links ==
=== Bus ===
The nearest bus stops to the centre are on Holmside, Green Terrace, & Fawcett Street. Bus services run frequently throughout the North East to these stops near the centre, including the Country Ranger 8/8A/78 from Green Terrace, linking Sunderland to Consett & Stanley in County Durham, & the Prince Bishops 20/20A from Holmeside, linking Sunderland to Durham, both operated by Go North East, as well as services Stagecoach North East, such as the E1, linking Sunderland to Whitburn & South Shields in Tyne & Wear.

=== Metro ===
The nearest metro stations to the centre are Park Lane & Sunderland, which is also the town’s main railway station. Both stations are located less than one mile away, and connecting journeys take 5–10 minutes on foot; and are on the metro's green line. Services on the line serve areas in the north of the city (Seaburn & Boldon), Gateshead & Newcastle. Connections to other areas in the North East can also be made at metro stations such as Haymarket.
