= W281BE =

WRHM-HD2 W281BE W232AX
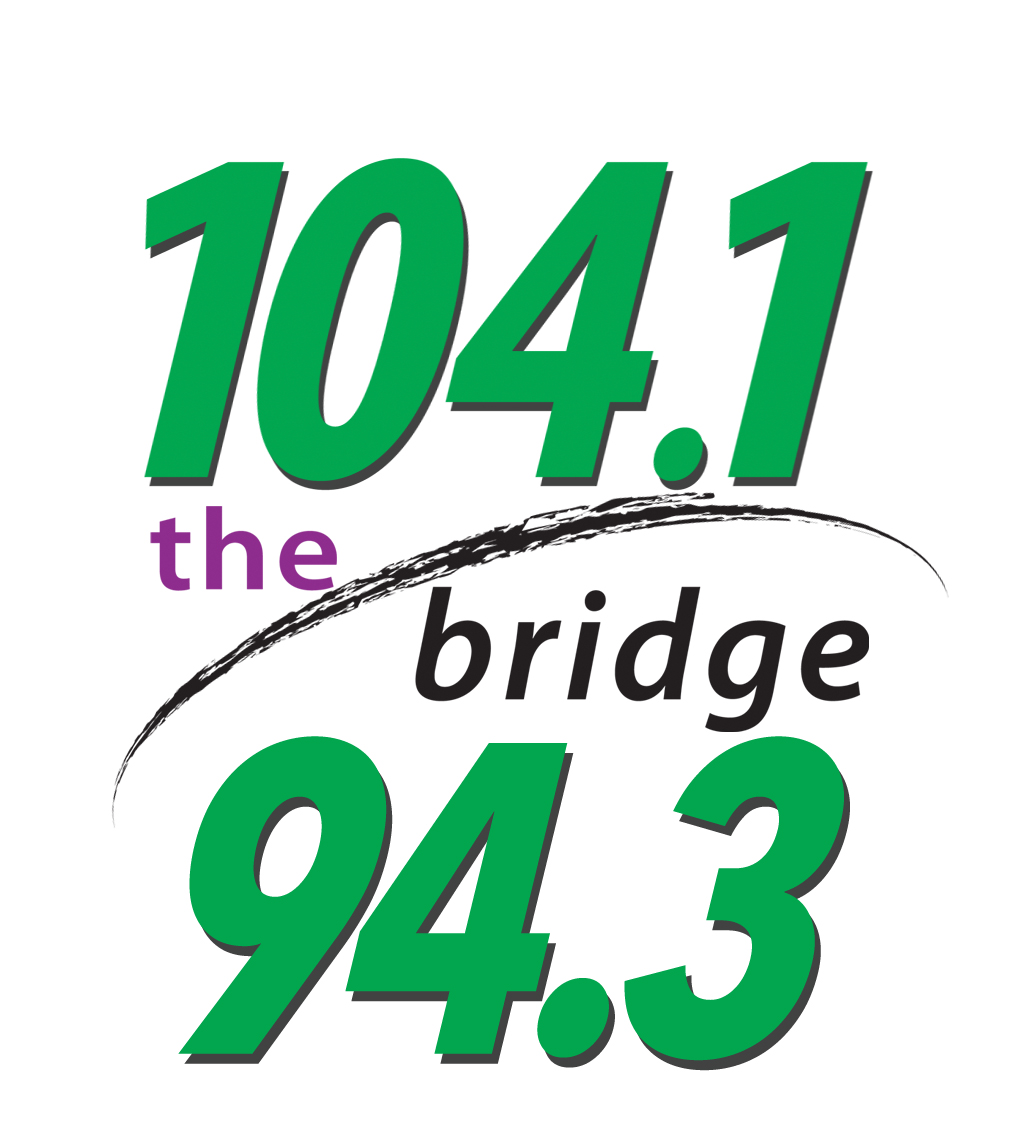

Fort Mill, South Carolina; United States
- Frequencies: 104.1 & 94.3 MHz
- Branding: 104.1 & 94.3 "The Bridge"

Programming
- Format: Contemporary Christian

Ownership
- Owner: OTS Media Group

Technical information
- Licensing authority: FCC
- Class: D
- Transmitter coordinates: 34°52′31.1″N 80°55′46.4″W

Links
- Public license information: W281BE W232AX Public file; LMS
- Website: www.1041thebridge.com

W281BE, known as 104.1 the Bridge, is a Contemporary Christian radio station licensed to Fort Mill, South Carolina, which relays the HD2 channel of WRHM. W232AX, which broadcasts on 94.3 FM also airs the same programming (also relays WRHM-HD2). The station is owned by parent group, OTS Media, which also owns WRHI/1340 and Interstate 107.1/107.3 (WRHM/WVSZ)

The station airs Winthrop University basketball, as well as a coaches' show featuring Pat Kelsey.

A ribbon cutting took place September 30, 2014.
