= Patrick Jones (author) =

American writer (born 1961)

Patrick Jones (born 1961) is a librarian and the author of realistic teen novels.

== Biography ==
Chasing Tail Lights (2007) was a finalist in the YA category in the 2008 Minnesota Book Award. In 2006, he won lifetime achievement awards from both the Catholic Library Association, and the American Library Association. Jones is a frequent speaker at library conferences, having visited all fifty states, as well as in Canada, Singapore, Australia, and New Zealand. Jones grew up in Flint, Michigan & attended Ainsworth Highschool, but now lives in Minneapolis, Minnesota.

== Bibliography ==
=== Novels ===
- Things Change (Walker & Company, 2004)
- Nailed (Walker Books for Young People, 2006)
- Chasing Tail Lights(2007)
- Stolen Car (Walker / Bloomsbury, 2008)
- Cheated (Walker / Bloomsbury, 2008)
- The Tear Collector (Walker Books for Young People, 2009)
- (With The Elsinore Quills) Cassandra's Turn: A Tear Collector Novel (Dragon Gems, 2013)

=== Professional Publications ===
- Do it Right! Best Practices for Serving Young Adults in School and Public Libraries (Neal-Schuman, 2001)
- Running a Successful Library Card Campaign, A How-To-Do-It Manual for Librarians (Neal-Schuman, 2002)
- A Core Collection for Young Adults (Neal-Schuman, 2003)
- Connecting Young Adults and Libraries (Neal-Schuman, 2004)
- Connecting with Reluctant Readers (Neal-Schuman, 2006)
