= Bridge City =

Bridge City may refer to a place in the United States:

- Bridge City, Louisiana, a census-designated place
- Bridge City, Texas, a city located in the Beaumont–Port Arthur metropolitan area
