= Bridging =

Bridging may refer to:

== Construction ==
- Building of bridges across a gap
- Cross bracing used between joists to stabilize them, also known as bridging

== Computing and electronics ==
- Bridging (networking), a packet forwarding technique used in computer networks
- Bridging (programming), a system that allows different programming languages to share common resources
- Impedance bridging, using a low source impedance to drive a large load impedance for maximum voltage transfer, in audio engineering and sound recording

== Sport ==
- Bridge (exercise), also known as bridging
- Bridging, a climbing technique used for climbing corners

== See also ==
- Bridge (disambiguation)
- Bridging vein
- Bridging visa, a type of temporary visa issued by the Australian Government
- Bridged and paralleled amplifiers
