= Bridge (2020 film) =

2020 Assamese-language film

- Directed by: Kripal Kalita
- Written by: Kripal Kalita
- Starring: Kripal Kalita; Parth Pratim Bora; Swapnil Nath; Anindita
- Release date: 2020
- Country: India
- Language: Assamese

Bridge is a 2020 Indian Assamese-language drama film directed by Kripal Kalita. The film explores the impact of recurring floods on rural communities in Assam, focusing on the everyday struggles of people living along the Brahmaputra river.

The film was screened at the Indian Panorama section of the International Film Festival of India (IFFI) and received a special mention at the festival.

== Plot ==
Bridge follows the life of a young girl and her family living in a flood-prone region of Assam. The narrative depicts their daily challenges, including seasonal displacement, lack of infrastructure, and difficulty accessing essential services such as education and healthcare. The absence of a bridge connecting their village to nearby areas plays a central role in the story, symbolising both physical isolation and broader socio-economic barriers.

== Cast ==
- Shivarani Kalita
- Kripal Kalita
- Parth Pratim Bora
- Swapnil Nath
- Anindita

== Production ==
The film marks the feature debut of director Kripal Kalita, who drew from real-life experiences of flood-affected communities in Assam. It was shot on location in flood-affected areas, with several sequences filmed in challenging natural conditions.

== Themes ==
The film addresses issues such as seasonal flooding, rural isolation, and infrastructural challenges in Assam. It also explores the resilience of communities facing recurring natural disasters. According to The Times of India, the film portrays the hardships faced by villagers during annual floods in Assam.

== Release and festival screenings ==
Bridge was selected for the Indian Panorama section at the 51st International Film Festival of India (IFFI), held in Goa. The film received a Special Mention at the festival.

== Reception ==
The Indian Express stated, the film's focus on living with and responding to the recurring floods in Assam. In The Times of India, Gauree Malkarnekar described that the film depicts the devastation and challenges faced by villages during flood seasons.

== Awards and recognition ==
- 2021: Special Mention – International Film Festival of India (IFFI).
- 2022: Best Feature Film in Assamese – 68th National Film Awards.

== See also ==
- Cinema of Assam
- List of Assamese films
