= Transparent (band) =

American rock band

- Origin: Hornell, New York, USA
- Genres: Alternative rock, rock, Christian
- Years active: 2010–present
- Label: Unsigned
- Members: Matthew Sassano
- Website: transparentrockband.com

Transparent is a United States rock band from upstate New York consisting of Matthew Sassano, Bradley Meise, and Quintin Olix . Transparent's song, "Bridges", is the main menu song on NASCAR The Game: Inside Line that was released on November 6, 2012. The band released their first full-length album, Light in Darkness, on June 6, 2013. They have opened for bands such as Project 86, Scarlet White, and Cry to the Blind. The band was formed in October 2010. Their logo consists of a pink and purple ribcage.

== History ==
Lead singer and songwriter, Matthew Sassano, was always involved in the music and arts within church and his local scene from a young age. A video performance of the band Skillet inspired him to start his own band as well as take a trip in October 2010, when Sassano and now band manager, Steve Cox, drove out to Indiana to see a Ron Paul campaign. When they returned, they started the band. The first song written was "Paranoid". A four-song demo was released in July 2011. In October 2011, Sassano went out to New Mexico to visit family and during that trip, he wrote "Bridges". More songs were written to complete their first full-length album, Light in Darkness, in October 2012.

== "Bridges" ==
"Bridges" is based on the prodigal son in the Bible. The song almost got thrown out initially because of the drum interpretation by a previous drummer before Jesse Sprinkle. It became the main menu song on the video game NASCAR The Game: Inside Line. During the summer and fall of 2012, Alfred State College Digital Media Animation students made the music video for "Bridges". The director was Jeremy Schwartz, a professor for the Digital Media Department who has worked on Robot Chicken on Cartoon Network.

== Light in Darkness ==
Light in Darkness is Transparent's first full-length album. It was released on June 6, 2013. The album has 11 original songs and was recorded over the span of 2011-2012.
