= USS Bridge =

Two ships of the United States Navy have been named Bridge, in honor of Commodore Horatio Bridge.

- USS Bridge (AF-1), was launched on 18 May 1916 by the Boston Navy Yard.
- USNS Bridge (T-AOE-10), was launched on 24 August 1996 and commissioned on 5 August 1998 as USS Bridge (AOE-10). She was decommissioned on 24 June 2004, renamed USNS Bridge, and transferred to the Military Sealift Command to subsequently operate in support of US naval forces with a primarily civilian crew.

== See also ==
- Bridge-class stores ship
