= Bridge to Nowhere (disambiguation) =

A bridge to nowhere is a bridge where one or both ends are broken or incomplete and does not lead anywhere.

Bridge to Nowhere may refer to:

== Bridges ==
- The Alaskan bridge to nowhere, more properly known as the Gravina Island Bridge, a proposed bridge often cited in the 2000s as an example of pork-barrel spending by the U.S. federal government
- Bridge to Nowhere (San Gabriel Mountains), north of Azusa, California, USA
- Bridge to Nowhere (New Zealand), in Whanganui National Park, North Island

== Film ==
- The Bridge to Nowhere, a 2009 film by Blair Underwood
- Bridge to Nowhere (film), a 1986 film by Ian Mune

== Books and comics ==
- The Bridge to Nowhere (novel), a 1993 novel by Megan McDonald
- Bridge to Nowhere, a 1989 novel by Yvonne Whittal
- The Bridge to Nowhere, a 1986 story in The Transformers published by Marvel Comics

== Songs ==
- "Bridge to Nowhere" (song), by Sam Roberts, 2006
- "Bridge to Nowhere", by the Like from Are You Thinking What I'm Thinking?, 2005

== See also ==
- Road to nowhere (disambiguation)
