= The Bridge (Letter Kills album) =

Studio album by Letter Kills
- Released: July 2, 2004
- Recorded: 2003–2004
- Genre: Alternative rock, post-hardcore
- Length: 40:15
- Label: Island
- Producer: Jim Wirt

Professional ratings
Review scores
Source	Rating
Allmusic	link
Redefine	(B+) link

The Bridge is the debut and only studio album by American alternative rock band Letter Kills. Produced by Jim Wirt, the album was released on July 2, 2004 through Island Records. It peaked at number 130 on the Billboard top 200 albums chart, but spawned no hit singles. Letter Kills disbanded while working on a follow-up record, later reforming in 2023.

== Track listing ==
The Bridge
No.	Title	Length
1.	"Lights Out"	2:57
2.	"Don't Believe"	2:49
3.	"Whatever It Takes"	3:32
4.	"Brand New Man"	3:11
5.	"Clock Is Down"	4:13
6.	"Time Marches On"	3:44
7.	"Carry You"	3:21
8.	"Hold My Heart (Part 2)"	2:05
9.	"When You're Away"	3:35
10.	"Radio Up"	2:48
11.	"Shot to the Chest"	3:10
12.	"Hold My Heart (Part 1)"	4:50
Total length:		40:15

Non album tracks
No.	Title	Length
13.	"For the Weekend..."
14.	"I'll Be Fine"
15.	"Seven Months"
16.	"Village Anthem"

== Personnel ==
Letter Kills

- Matthew James Shelton – lead vocals
- Timothy Cordova – lead guitar, backing vocals
- Dustin Lovelis – rhythm guitar, backing vocals
- Kyle Duckworth – bass guitar, backing vocals
- Paul Remund – drums, backing vocals

Artwork

- Matthew Lindauer – art direction, design

Management

- Paul Resta – marketing

Production

- Jim Wirt – producer, engineer, mixing
- Tara Podolsky & Paul Pontius – A&R
- Pete Martinez – assistant engineer
- Neil Couser – digital editing
- CJ Eiriksson – digital editing, engineer, mixing
- Andrew Huggins, Phil Kaffel, & P.J. Smith– engineers
- Tom Lord-Alge – mixing
- Stephen Marcussen – mastering

== Charts ==
Chart (2004)	Peak position
US Billboard 200	130
Top Heatseekers	4

== Notes ==
The track "Radio Up" was featured on the game Burnout 3: Takedown and in NHL 2005.
