= Bridge (Shachtman) =

Sculpture in Denver, Colorado, U.S.

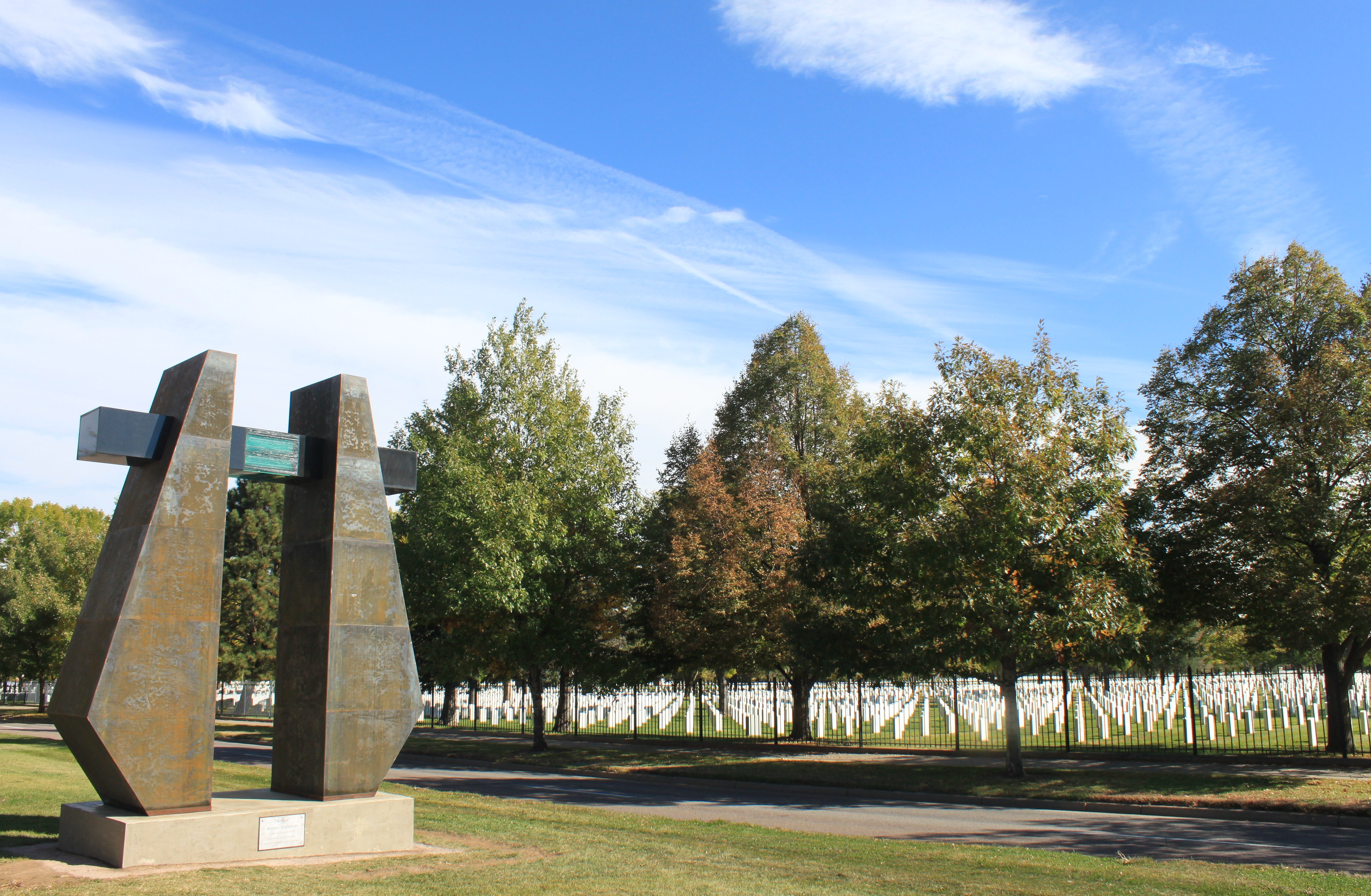
- Artist: Stephen Shachtman
- Location: Denver, Colorado, United States
- 39.647823°N 105.053137°W

Bridge is a sculpture by Stephen Shachtman, installed in Denver, Colorado, United States.
