= Estela (restaurant) =

Restaurant in New York City

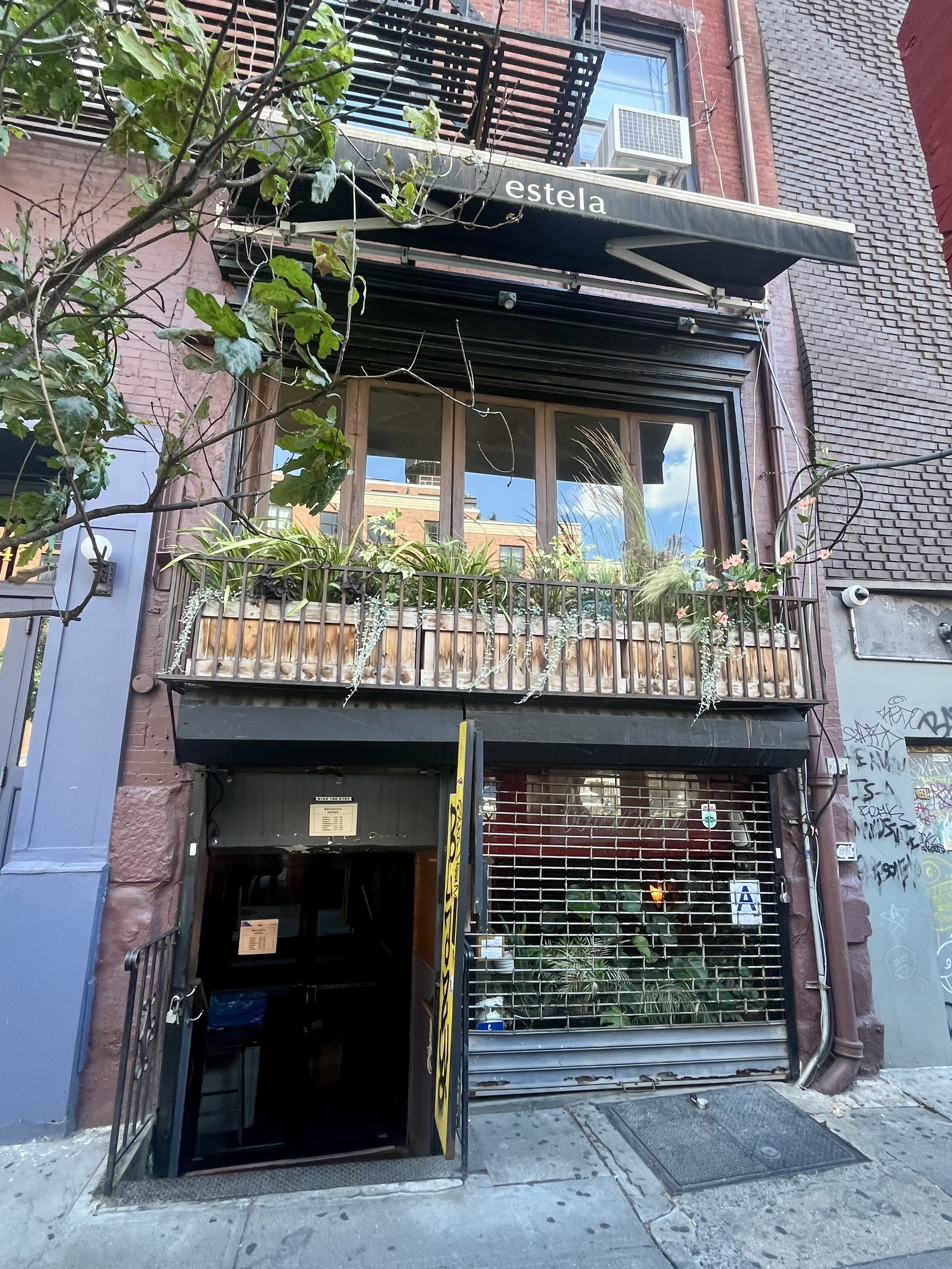
- The restaurant's exterior in 2024
- Interactive map of Estela

Restaurant information
- Established: June 19, 2013
- Head chef: Ignacio Mattos
- Food type: American; Mediterranean
- Rating: (Michelin Guide)
- Location: 47 East Houston Street, New York City, New York, 10012, United States
- Coordinates: 40°43′28.9″N 73°59′41″W
- Website: estelanyc.com

Estela is a restaurant located in Lower Manhattan, New York City. The restaurant serves American and Mediterranean cuisine, and has received a Michelin star.

== See also ==
- List of Michelin-starred restaurants in New York City
