= WVSZ =

- Chesterfield, South Carolina; United States
- Frequency: 107.3 MHz (HD Radio)
- Branding: Interstate 107

Programming
- Format: Country music
- Affiliations: ABC Radio

Ownership
- Owner: Our Three Sons Broadcasting, Llp

Technical information
- Licensing authority: FCC
- Facility ID: 14911
- Class: A
- ERP: 4,500 watts
- HAAT: 100 meters
- Transmitter coordinates: 34°43′12″N 80°5′45″W

Links
- Public license information: Public file; LMS
- Webcast: Listen Live
- Website: fm107.com

WVSZ (107.3 FM) is a radio station broadcasting a country music format. Licensed to Chesterfield, South Carolina, United States, the station is currently owned by Our Three Sons Broadcasting, LLP and features programming from ABC Radio .
