= Bridge (musician) =

American singer

- Birth name: Jonathan Yoni Laham
- Born: September 8, 1991 (age 34); Beverly Hills, California, U.S.
- Genres: Alternative pop; pop; R&B; hip hop
- Occupations: Singer; Rapper; Songwriter; Producer
- Years active: 2014–present
- Labels: Warner Records; XX Recordings
- Website: www.whoisbridge.com

Jonathan Yoni Laham, known professionally as BRIDGE is an American singer, songwriter and producer from Los Angeles. Debuting with the single "Roll My Weed" featuring Schoolboy Q in 2014, Bridge gained fame in 2019 for the song "GOMF", collaborating with DVBBS. He has released the albums Wreck (2017) and Smug (2019). In 2019, Bridge became the co-founder of gender neutral jewelry line Martyre, created with Anwar Hadid. In the same year, Bridge also launched his independent record label XX Recordings.

== Life and career ==
Bridge grew up in Beverly Hills, California in Los Angeles County. After being kicked out of several private schools, Bridge attended Beverly Hills High School. He began creating music in 2011, choosing the stage name Bridges due to his ability to cross genres. In 2014, Bridge debuted as a musician with the song "Roll My Weed" featuring Schoolboy Q, and planned to release a debut extended play produced by Malay and Robin Hannibal, however the release never eventuated.

In late 2017, Bridge released his debut album Wreck through Warner Records. In May 2019, Bridge became the co-founder of the gender neutral jewelry company Martyre, which he created alongside Anwar Hadid. In the same month, Bridge's collaboration with DVBBS, entitled "GOMF", became a hit on the Billboard Dance/Electronic Songs chart, which was followed by his second album Smug in June.

In 2019, Bridge formed the independent label XX Recordings, releasing his first single through the label, "DYDRM", in November 2019. During the COVID-19 pandemic in California, Bridge released eight singles in the course of 2020. Bridge plans to release a self-titled extended play in the first half of 2021.

== Personal life ==
In 2016, Bridge was linked romantically to British musician Rita Ora.

== Discography ==
=== Studio albums ===
Title	Details
Wreck	Released: December 15, 2017; Label: Warner Records; Formats: Digital download, streaming
Smug	Released: June 7, 2019; Label: Bridge; Formats: Digital download, streaming

=== Singles ===
==== As lead artist ====
List of singles, showing year released and album name
Title	Year	Album
"Roll My Weed" (featuring Schoolboy Q)	2014	Non-album single
"Save Me"	2017	Wreck
"If Only"	2017	Non-album single
"Break the Rules"	2017	Wreck
"Brainwaves" (featuring Vory)	2017	Non-album single
"Lost My Mind"	2018	Wreck
"With You"	2018	Non-album single
"Make Me"	2018	Smug
"Dreaming"	2018	Smug
"Secrets"	2019	Non-album singles
"DYDRM"	2019	Non-album singles
"24" (featuring Vory)	2020	Non-album singles
"Who"	2020	Non-album singles
"LoveClose"	2020	Non-album singles
"Body"	2020	Non-album singles
"Night Drive / Sunset Tower 003"	2020	Non-album singles
"Across the Universe"	2020	Non-album singles
"Around"	2020	Non-album singles
"It’s Ok"	2020	Non-album singles
"Make Me Miss You"	2021	Non-album singles

==== As featured artist ====
List of songs, with selected chart positions and album name
Title	Year	Peak chart positions		Album
Title	Year	US Dance Club	US Dance Electronic	Album
"GOMF" (DVBBS, Bridge)	2019	29	22	Nothing to See Here
"Two Little Bird" (Zoe Kypri featuring Bridge)	2019	—	—	Tides
"—" denotes a recording that did not chart or was not released in that territory.

=== Guest appearances ===
Title	Year	Other artists	Album
"Leftovers"	2019	Anwar Hadid	Bleach
