= WRHI =

Coordinates: 34°58′59″N 81°01′11″W

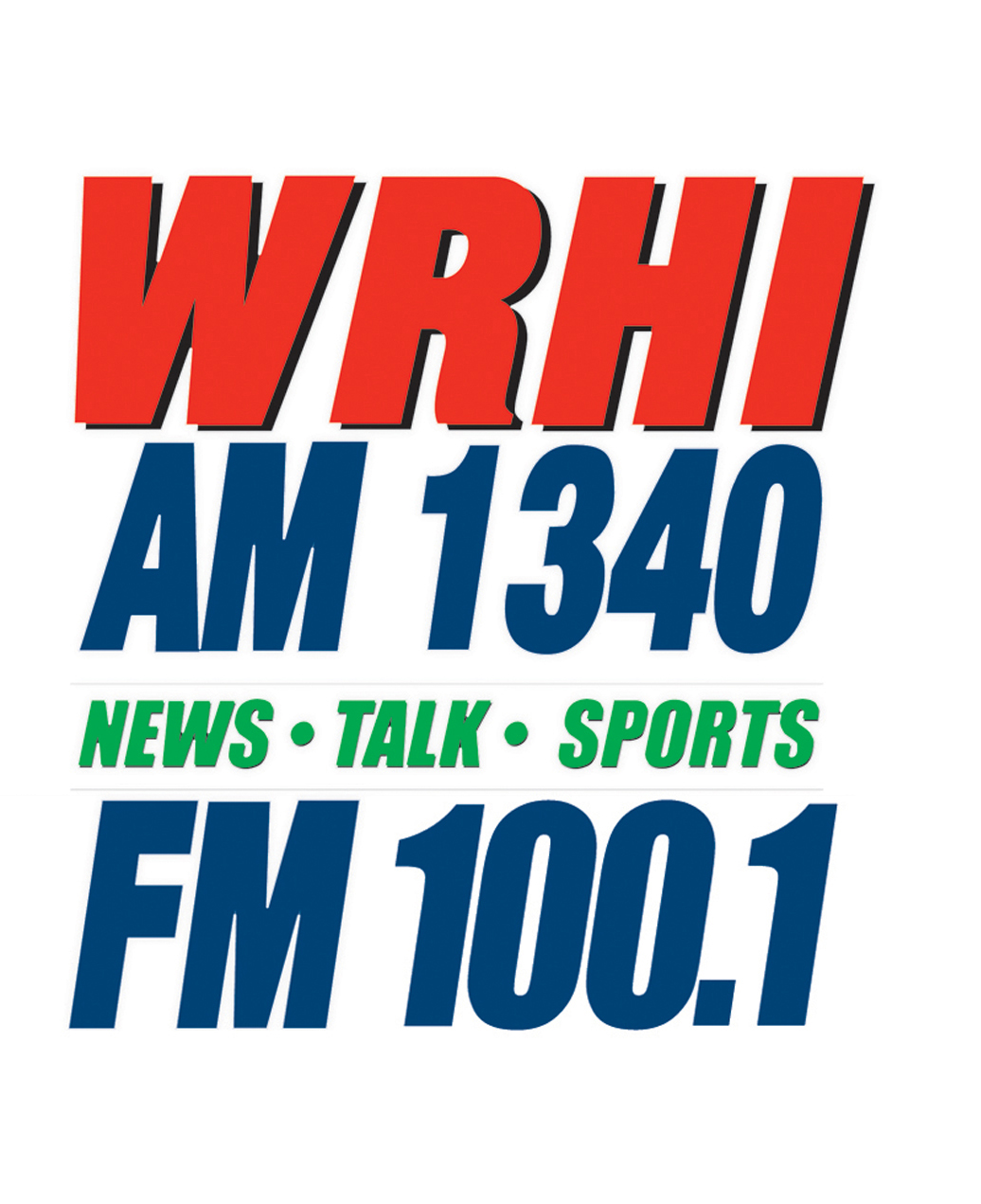
- Rock Hill, South Carolina; United States
- Broadcast area: Rock Hill Area–Metrolina
- Frequency: 1340 kHz
- Branding: WRHI FM 100.1

Programming
- Format: News/Talk
- Affiliations: Cumulus Media; Fox News; The Lampo Group

Ownership
- Owner: OTS Media

History
- First air date: 1944; 82 years ago
- Call sign meaning: Watch Rock Hill Increase

Technical information
- Licensing authority: FCC
- Facility ID: 50777
- Class: C
- Power: 1,000 watts
- Translator: 100.1 W261CY (Rock Hill)

Links
- Public license information: Public file; LMS
- Website: WRHI.com

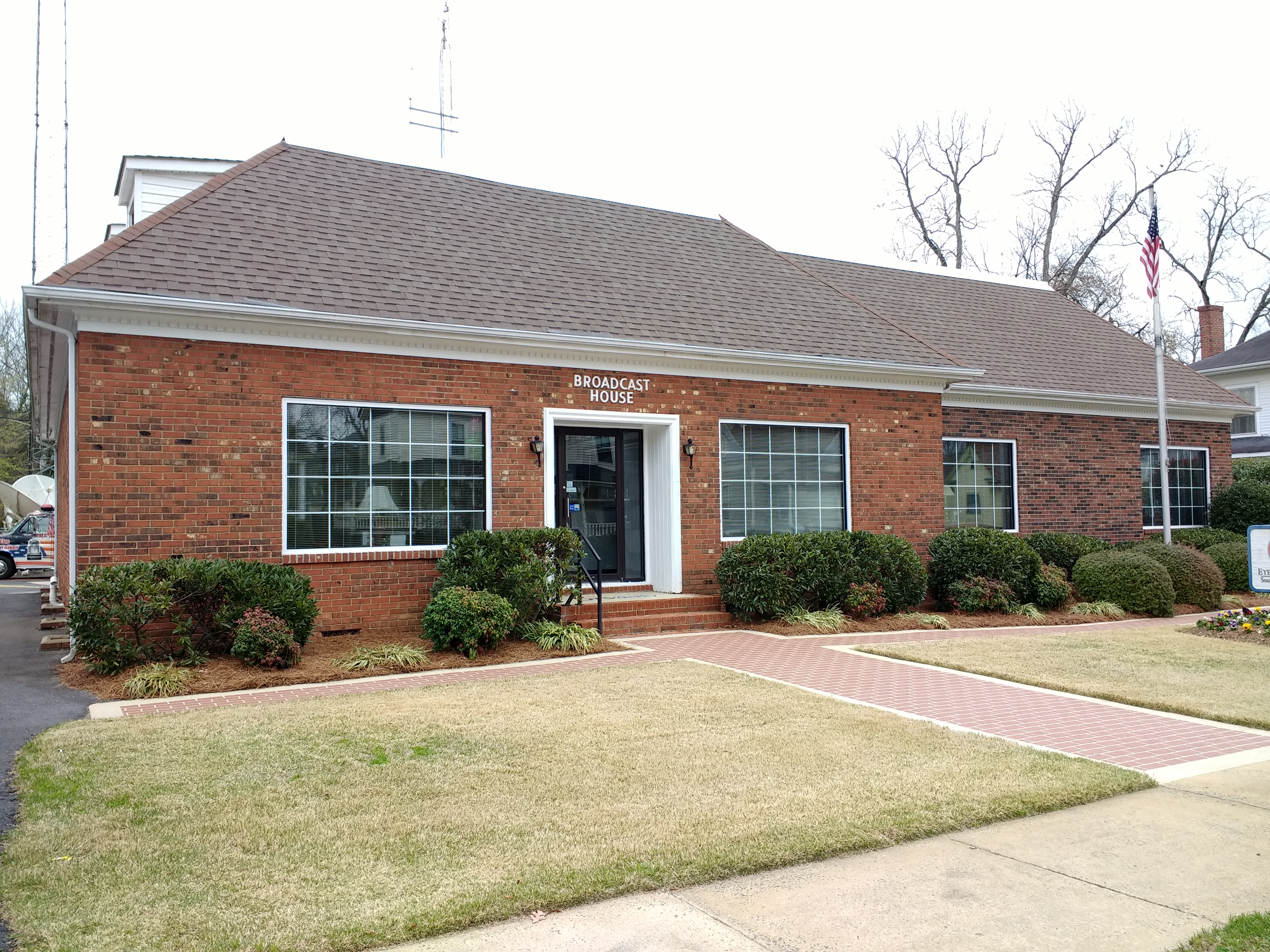
WRHI broadcast house in Rock Hill

WRHI is a news/talk radio station in Rock Hill, South Carolina. It broadcasts on AM frequency 1340 kHz with a simulcast on 100.1 FM (via translator W261CY) and is under ownership of OTS Media Group. Its studios and transmitter are both located separately in Rock Hill. In addition to WRHI, OTS Media owns WRHM-FM 107.1, WVSZ-FM 107.3, FM 94.3, FM 104.1, and CN2 & CN2Xtra Television (seen on Comporium Cable Channels 102 and 103)

== Awards ==
WRHI is a nine-time winner of the South Carolina Broadcasters Association Radio Station of the Year award. Since 2000, WRHI has been honored with over 200 "Star Awards" from the South Carolina Broadcasters Association, becoming the most honored station in South Carolina History. With its nine Station of the Year awards, WRHI has been named Statewide Radio Station of the Year more than any other Radio Station.

== Affiliations ==
Throughout the day, WRHI carries Fox News Radio at the top of every hour and local news and weather. Local news is gathered by the local news staff and television partner WSOC-TV.

== Staff ==
Allan Miller, a 2009 South Carolina Broadcaster's Association Hall of Fame inductee, serves as Co-Owner. Manning Kimmel, a 2014 South Carolina Broadcaster's Association Masters Award winner, serves as Co-Owner. Chris Miller, 13-Time South Carolina Statewide Sportscaster of the Year, serves as company Vice President. Steven Stone serves as Operations Manager. Noreen Ruff is traffic director and office manager. Bonita Perry is executive assistant. Lucas McFadden, Tyler Cupp, Ashley Lang, and Alex Greenawalt serve as the Morning Show team the Award-winning "Palmetto Mornings". Catherine Madden serves as a broadcast marketing executive and special events coordinator. Rovenia Miller serves as a broadcast marketing executive. Sheilah Kimmel serves as Straight Talk producer. Jackson Taylor and Charlie Derek serve as production talent. Matt Hiers serves as a broadcast engineer.

== Sports ==
WRHI is the radio home of Winthrop University men's basketball. The station also carries Clemson University and University of South Carolina football and basketball games and coaches' call-in shows. Selected Coastal Carolina University football games are carried as well.

WRHI also carries Rock Hill High School, Northwestern High School, and South Pointe High School football and basketball games as well as Fort Mill High School, Clover High School, Lancaster High School, Nation Ford, and York High School football games. WRHI annually puts on major area promotions including: The Great Easter Egg Classic, Toys For Happiness, Prom Pledge, and Boo-HaHa. Since 2017, WRHI, in conjunction with Rock Hill School District Three, has presented the Football City USA Kickoff. This annual event features a season opening three-game slate featuring Rock Hill's three high schools versus teams from around the Carolinas. The event is played annually on the Friday before the beginning of the High School Football season.
