= Michigander =

Person from Michigan

A map of the demonyms of Michigan.

"Michigander" (/ˈmɪ.ʃəˌɡæn.dər/ mih-shə-GAN-der) and "Michiganian" (/ˈmɪ.ʃəˌɡeɪ.niən/ mih-shə-GAY-nee-ən) are unofficial demonyms for natives and residents of the U.S. state of Michigan. Less common alternatives include Michiganer, Michiganite, Michiganese, Michigine, and Michigoose (female).

== Difference in terminology ==
=== Michigander vs. Michiganian ===
While governors Jim Blanchard, John Engler, and Jennifer Granholm used Michiganian, more recent governors Rick Snyder and Gretchen Whitmer have used Michigander. A 2011 poll indicated 58% of Michigan residents preferred Michigander, compared to 12% for Michiganian, with 12% having no preference, and 11% not liking either term. In 2017, as part of a unanimous bill to modernize the legislation establishing the Michigan Historical Commission, the state legislature changed a reference from Michiganian to Michigander, implicitly endorsing the latter term. The federal government continues to use Michiganian.

=== Yooper ===
Residents of the Upper Peninsula typically refer to themselves instead as Yoopers (a formation derived from the initials U.P.) either instead of or in addition to a state demonym. They sometimes refer to residents of the Lower Peninsula who live "below the bridge" between the peninsulas as trolls, but this term is rarely self-applied.

== Origins ==
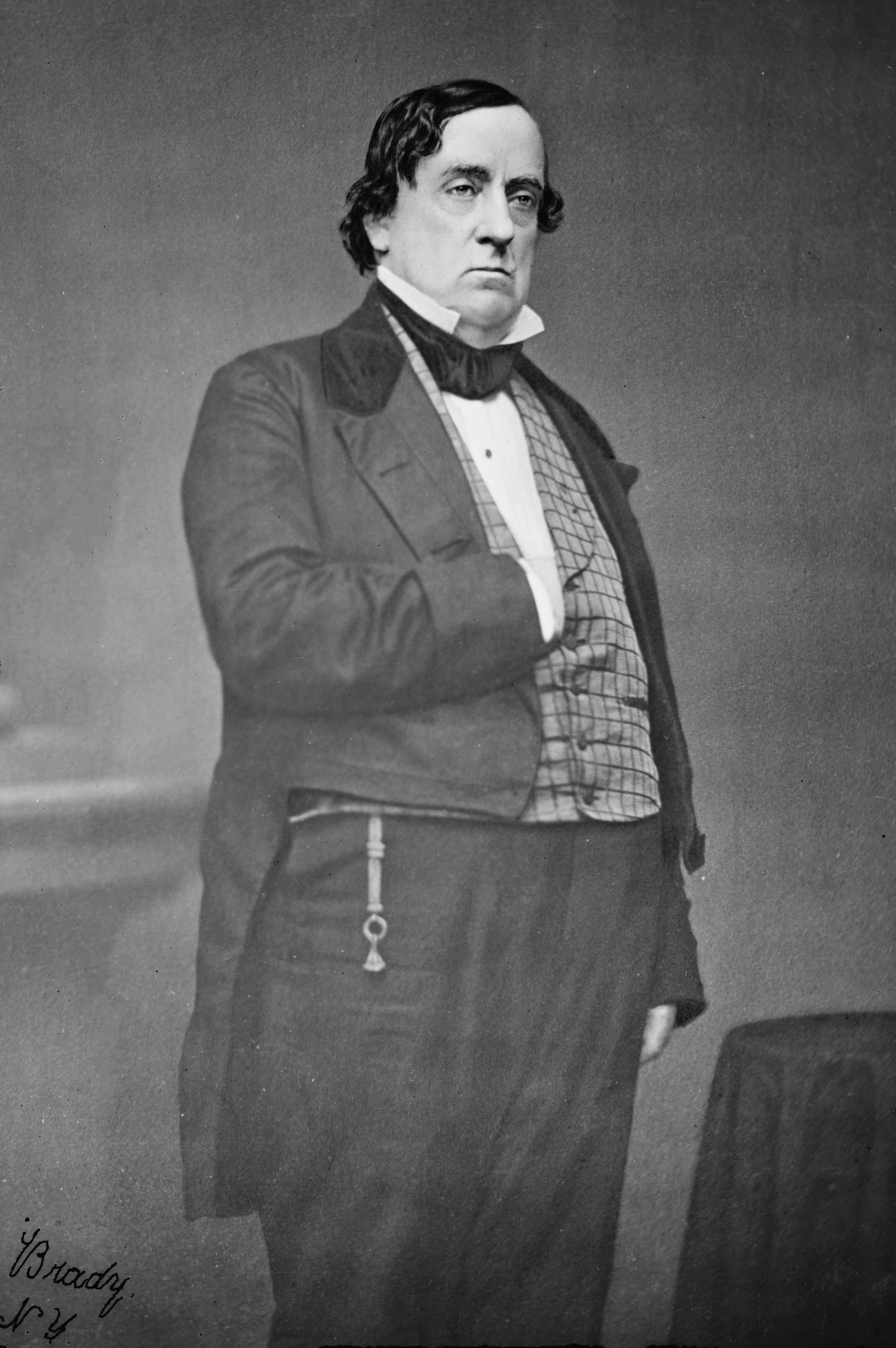
Lewis Cass

Michiganian is the term used for the state's citizens in The Collections of the Michigan Pioneer and Historical Society since the 1870s.

Michigander is considered pejorative by some due to the circumstances under which the term was popularized, but others perceive no such negative connotation. Even though the term was in use by at least 1820, it has nevertheless commonly been attributed to Abraham Lincoln, who popularized it when he was a Whig representative in Congress.

On July 27, 1848, Lincoln made a speech against Lewis Cass, who had been a long-time governor of the Michigan Territory. Cass was then running for president on a "popular sovereignty" platform that would have let states that were conquered in the Mexican–American War decide whether to legalize slavery. Lincoln accused the Democrats of campaigning on the former President Andrew Jackson's coattails by exaggerating their military accomplishments.

But in my hurry I was very near closing on the subject of military tales before I was done with it. There is one entire article of the sort I have not discussed yet; I mean the military tale you Democrats are now engaged in dovetailing onto the great Michigander [i.e. Lewis Cass].

Despite that, Michigan voters would go on to favor Lincoln for President twice, in 1860 and 1864.
