= United States presidential elections in Michigan =

Presidential elections in Michigan
- Number of elections: 48
- Voted Democratic: 17
- Voted Republican: 29
- Voted Whig: 1
- Voted other: 1 (Note: Theodore Roosevelt, 1912.)
- Voted for winning candidate: 35
- Voted for losing candidate: 13

Following is a table of United States presidential elections in Michigan, ordered by year. Since its admission to statehood in 1837, Michigan has participated in every U.S. presidential election, although they did participate in the 1836 election and receive electoral votes. Michigan is tied with Pennsylvania and Wisconsin for the longest active streak of voting for the winning candidate since 2008, last voting for a losing candidate in 2004 when they backed John Kerry.

Winners of the state are in bold. The shading refers to the state winner, and not the national winner.

== Elections from 1864 to present ==
View source data.

Year	Winner (nationally)	Votes	Percent	Runner-up (nationally)	Votes	Percent	Other national candidates (Note: For purposes of these lists, other national candidates are defined as those who won at least one electoral vote, or won at least ten percent of the vote in multiple states.)	Votes	Percent	Electoral votes	Notes
2024	**Donald Trump**	2,816,636	49.73	Kamala Harris	2,736,533	48.31	—			16	
2020	**Joe Biden**	2,804,040	50.62	Donald Trump	2,649,852	47.84	—			16	
2016	**Donald Trump** (Note: Won the electoral college while losing the popular vote)	2,279,543	47.25	Hillary Clinton	2,268,839	47.03	Gary Johnson	173,057	3.6	16	
2012	**Barack Obama**	2,564,569	54.21	Mitt Romney	2,115,256	44.71	-			16	
2008	**Barack Obama**	2,872,579	57.43	John McCain	2,048,639	40.96	-			17	
2004	George W. Bush	2,313,746	47.81	**John Kerry**	2,479,183	51.23	-			17	
2000	George W. Bush	1,953,139	46.15	**Al Gore**	2,170,418	51.28	-			18	
1996	**Bill Clinton**	1,989,653	51.69	Bob Dole	1,481,212	38.48	Ross Perot	336,670	8.75	18	
1992	**Bill Clinton**	1,871,182	43.77	George H. W. Bush	1,554,940	36.38	Ross Perot	824,813	19.3	18	
1988	**George H. W. Bush**	1,965,486	53.57	Michael Dukakis	1,675,783	45.67	-			20	
1984	**Ronald Reagan**	2,251,571	59.23	Walter Mondale	1,529,638	40.24	-			20	
1980	**Ronald Reagan**	1,915,225	48.99	Jimmy Carter	1,661,532	42.50	John B. Anderson	275,223	7.04	21	
1976	Jimmy Carter	1,696,714	46.44	**Gerald Ford**	1,893,742	51.83	-			21	
1972	**Richard Nixon**	1,961,721	56.20	George McGovern	1,459,435	41.81	-			21	
1968	Richard Nixon	1,370,665	41.46	**Hubert Humphrey**	1,593,082	48.18	George Wallace	331,968	10.04	21	
1964	**Lyndon B. Johnson**	2,136,615	66.70	Barry Goldwater	1,060,152	33.10	-			21	
1960	**John F. Kennedy**	1,687,269	50.85	Richard Nixon	1,620,428	48.84	-			20	
1956	**Dwight D. Eisenhower**	1,713,647	55.63	Adlai Stevenson II	1,359,898	44.15	T. Coleman Andrews/ Unpledged Electors (Note: Was allied with a slate of unpledged electors in Louisiana, Mississippi and South Carolina)	-		20	
1952	**Dwight D. Eisenhower**	1,551,529	55.44	Adlai Stevenson II	1,230,657	43.97	-			20	
1948	Harry S. Truman	1,003,448	47.57	**Thomas E. Dewey**	1,038,595	49.23	Strom Thurmond	-		19	
1944	**Franklin D. Roosevelt**	1,106,899	50.19	Thomas E. Dewey	1,084,423	49.18	-			19	
1940	Franklin D. Roosevelt	1,032,991	49.52	**Wendell Willkie**	1,039,917	49.85	-			19	
1936	**Franklin D. Roosevelt**	1,016,794	56.33	Alf Landon	699,733	38.76	-			19	
1932	**Franklin D. Roosevelt**	871,700	52.36	Herbert Hoover	739,894	44.44	-			19	
1928	**Herbert Hoover**	965,396	70.36	Al Smith	396,762	28.92	-			15	
1924	**Calvin Coolidge**	874,631	75.37	John W. Davis	152,359	13.13	Robert M. La Follette	122,014	10.51	15	
1920	**Warren G. Harding**	762,865	72.76	James M. Cox	233,450	22.27	Parley P. Christensen	10,480	1.00	15	
1916	Woodrow Wilson	286,775	44.05	**Charles E. Hughes**	339,097	52.09	-			15	
1912	Woodrow Wilson	150,751	27.36	**Theodore Roosevelt**	214,584	38.95	William H. Taft	152,244	27.63	15	
1908	**William H. Taft**	335,580	61.93	William Jennings Bryan	175,771	32.44	-			14	
1904	**Theodore Roosevelt**	364,957	69.51	Alton B. Parker	135,392	25.79	-			14	
1900	**William McKinley**	316,269	58.10	William Jennings Bryan	211,685	38.89	-			14	
1896	**William McKinley**	293,336	53.77	William Jennings Bryan	237,166	43.47	-			14	
1892	Grover Cleveland	201,624	43.26	**Benjamin Harrison**	222,708	47.79	James B. Weaver	19,931	4.28	14	Electoral vote split 9–5 by Congressional District method.
1888	**Benjamin Harrison**	236,387	49.73	Grover Cleveland	213,469	44.91	-			13	
1884	Grover Cleveland	189,361	47.20	**James G. Blaine**	192,669	48.02	-			13	
1880	**James A. Garfield**	185,335	52.49	Winfield S. Hancock	131,597	37.27	James B. Weaver	34,895	9.88	11	
1876	**Rutherford B. Hayes**	166,901	52.41	Samuel J. Tilden	141,685	44.49	-			11	
1872	**Ulysses S. Grant**	138,758	62.66	Horace Greeley	78,551	35.47	-			11	
1868	**Ulysses S. Grant**	128,563	57.0	Horatio Seymour	97,069	43.0	-			8	
1864	**Abraham Lincoln**	91,133	55.1	George B. McClellan	74,146	44.9	-			8	

== Election of 1860 ==
The election of 1860 was a complex realigning election in which the breakdown of the previous two-party alignment culminated in four parties each competing for influence in different parts of the country. The result of the election, with the victory of an ardent opponent of slavery, spurred the secession of eleven states and brought about the American Civil War.

Year	Winner (nationally)	Votes	Percent	Runner-up (nationally)	Votes	Percent	Runner-up (nationally)	Votes	Percent	Runner-up (nationally)	Votes	Percent	Electoral votes
1860	**Abraham Lincoln**	88,481	57.2	Stephen A. Douglas	65,057	42.0	John C. Breckinridge	805	0.5	John Bell	415	0.3	6

== Elections prior to 1860 ==
Year	Winner (nationally)	Votes	Percent	Runner-up (nationally)	Votes	Percent	Other national candidates	Votes	Percent	Electoral votes	Notes
1856	James Buchanan	52,139	41.52	**John C. Frémont**	71,762	57.15	Millard Fillmore	1,660	1.32	6	
1852	**Franklin Pierce**	41,842	50.45	Winfield Scott	33,860	40.83	John P. Hale	7,237	8.73	6	
1848	Zachary Taylor	23,947	36.8	**Lewis Cass**	30,742	47.24	Martin Van Buren	10,393	15.97	5	
1844	**James K. Polk**	27,737	49.75	Henry Clay	24,375	43.72	-			5	
1840	**William Henry Harrison**	22,933	51.71	Martin Van Buren	21,096	47.57	-			3	
1836	**Martin Van Buren**	7,122	56.22	William Henry Harrison	5,545	43.78	various (Note: Three other candidates ran and received electoral votes nationally as part of the unsuccessful Whig strategy to defeat Martin Van Buren by running four candidates with local appeal in different regions of the country. The others were Hugh Lawson White, Daniel Webster, and Willie Person Mangum. None of these candidates appeared on the ballot in Michigan.)	-	-	3	

== See also ==
- Elections in Michigan
