= 1876 United States presidential election in Michigan =

- November 7, 1876

All 11 Michigan votes to the Electoral College
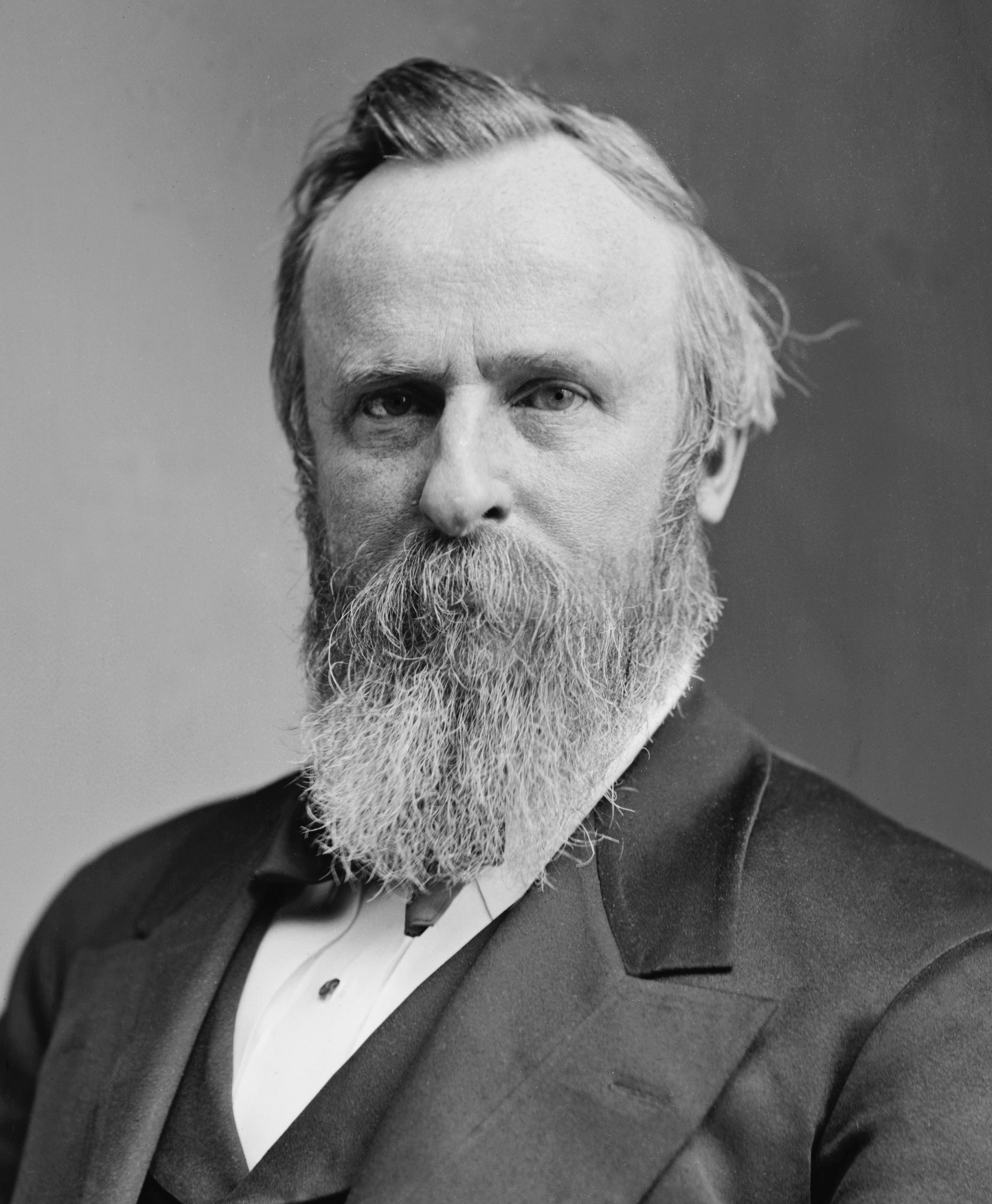

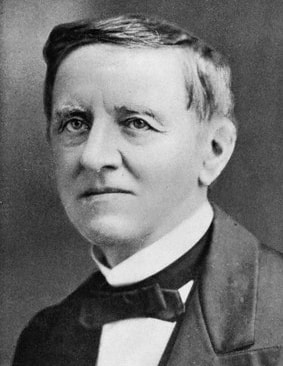
Nominee	Rutherford B. Hayes	Samuel J. Tilden
Party	Republican	Democratic
Home state	Ohio	New York
Running mate	William A. Wheeler	Thomas A. Hendricks
Electoral vote	11	0
Popular vote	166,534	141,095
Percentage	52.45%	44.44%
County results
Hayes
40–50%
50–60%
60–70%
70–80%
Tilden
50–60%
60–70%
70–80%
President before election
Ulysses S. Grant
Republican
Elected President
Rutherford B. Hayes
Republican

The 1876 United States presidential election in Michigan took place on November 7, 1876, as part of the 1876 United States presidential election. Voters chose 11 representatives, or electors, to the Electoral College, who voted for president and vice president.

Michigan was won by the Republican nominee Rutherford B. Hayes by an 8% margin, defeating Democratic candidate Samuel J. Tilden and taking the state's eleven electoral votes.

== Results ==
General Election Results
Party	Pledged to	Elector	Votes
Republican Party	Rutherford B. Hayes	Charles Kipp	166,534
Republican Party	Rutherford B. Hayes	Henry W. Lord	166,534
Republican Party	Rutherford B. Hayes	Preston Mitchell	166,530
Republican Party	Rutherford B. Hayes	Benton Hanchett	166,528
Republican Party	Rutherford B. Hayes	William A. Howard	166,528
Republican Party	Rutherford B. Hayes	William Doeltz	166,524
Republican Party	Rutherford B. Hayes	Charles H. Kempf	166,500
Republican Party	Rutherford B. Hayes	Jeremiah Jenks	166,497
Republican Party	Rutherford B. Hayes	Delos Phillips	166,495
Republican Party	Rutherford B. Hayes	William Dunham	166,483
Republican Party	Rutherford B. Hayes	Jacob Den Herder	166,562
Democratic Party	Samuel J. Tilden	Frederick Hall	141,095
Democratic Party	Samuel J. Tilden	Marshall L. Howell	141,094
Democratic Party	Samuel J. Tilden	James Heintzen	141,092
Democratic Party	Samuel J. Tilden	Austin Blair	141,086
Democratic Party	Samuel J. Tilden	Albert Miller	141,084
Democratic Party	Samuel J. Tilden	Michael Finnegan	141,022
Democratic Party	Samuel J. Tilden	Hugh McCurdy	140,856
Democratic Party	Samuel J. Tilden	James S. Upton	140,512
Democratic Party	Samuel J. Tilden	George V. N. Lothrop	140,067
Democratic Party	Samuel J. Tilden	Alfred I. Sawyer	139,300
Democratic Party	Samuel J. Tilden	James B. Eldredge	138,607
Greenback Party	Peter Cooper	Moses W. Field	9,060
Greenback Party	Peter Cooper	Henry Whiting	9,004
Greenback Party	Peter Cooper	John Peavey	8,989
Greenback Party	Peter Cooper	Thomas Munn	8,979
Greenback Party	Peter Cooper	Lysander Woodward	8,907
Greenback Party	Peter Cooper	Wilber H. Clute	8,873
Greenback Party	Peter Cooper	John M. McDonough	8,752
Greenback Party	Peter Cooper	William A. Berkey	8,655
Greenback Party	Peter Cooper	George W. Hopkins	8,554
Greenback Party	Peter Cooper	Charles C. Comstock	8,333
Greenback Party	Peter Cooper	Richard F. Trevellick	6,913
Prohibition Party	Green C. Smith	Jesse M. Miller	766
Prohibition Party	Green C. Smith	Oscar F. Hyde	765
Prohibition Party	Green C. Smith	Luman B. Atwater	762
Prohibition Party	Green C. Smith	Thomas A. Granger	754
Prohibition Party	Green C. Smith	William G. Brown	750
Prohibition Party	Green C. Smith	Charles K. Carpenter	736
Prohibition Party	Green C. Smith	James H. Hartwell	729
Prohibition Party	Green C. Smith	Zacharias Cook	634
Prohibition Party	Green C. Smith	Thomas S. Skinner	562
Prohibition Party	Green C. Smith	Orasmus L. Wolf	489
Prohibition Party	Green C. Smith	Newton B. Steward	460
Anti-Masonic Party	James B. Walker	John Remington	75
Anti-Masonic Party	James B. Walker	David Wylie	75
Anti-Masonic Party	James B. Walker	J. B. Crall	74
Anti-Masonic Party	James B. Walker	J. S. Lewis	74
Anti-Masonic Party	James B. Walker	E. W. Bruce	72
Anti-Masonic Party	James B. Walker	W. Hagerty	70
Anti-Masonic Party	James B. Walker	D. Gass	69
Anti-Masonic Party	James B. Walker	A. Aoldfield	64
Anti-Masonic Party	James B. Walker	S. P. Poole	62
Anti-Masonic Party	James B. Walker	William Parkis	57
Anti-Masonic Party	James B. Walker	H. S. Lambocker	56
Votes cast (Note: Based on highest elector on each ticket)			317,530

=== Results By County ===
County	Rutherford B. Hayes Republican		Samuel J. Tilden Democratic		Peter Cooper Greenback		Green C. Smith Prohibition		James B. Walker Anti-Masonic		Margin		Total votes cast
County	#	%	#	%	#	%	#	%	#	%	#	%	Total votes cast
Alcona	155	48.90%	162	51.10%	0	0.00%	0	0.00%	0	0.00%	-7	-2.21%	317
Allegan	4,281	55.42%	3,169	41.02%	274	3.55%	0	0.00%	1	0.01%	1,112	14.39%	7,725
Alpena	629	49.76%	635	50.24%	0	0.00%	0	0.00%	0	0.00%	-6	-0.47%	1,264
Antrim	475	62.83%	280	37.04%	1	0.13%	0	0.00%	0	0.00%	195	25.79%	756
Baraga	218	48.44%	232	51.56%	0	0.00%	0	0.00%	0	0.00%	-14	-3.11%	450
Barry	2,966	54.05%	1,902	34.66%	603	10.99%	9	0.16%	8	0.15%	1,064	19.39%	5,488
Bay	2,407	44.97%	2,840	53.05%	100	1.87%	4	0.07%	2	0.04%	-433	-8.09%	5,353
Benzie	474	71.06%	186	27.89%	7	1.05%	0	0.00%	0	0.00%	288	43.18%	667
Berrien	4,188	51.25%	3,679	45.03%	304	3.72%	0	0.00%	0	0.00%	509	6.23%	8,171
Branch	3,998	58.42%	2,370	34.63%	466	6.81%	6	0.09%	4	0.06%	1,628	23.79%	6,844
Calhoun	5,167	56.33%	3,885	42.35%	84	0.92%	33	0.36%	4	0.04%	1,282	13.98%	9,173
Cass	2,750	52.29%	2,336	44.42%	173	3.29%	0	0.00%	0	0.00%	414	7.87%	5,259
Charlevoix	411	66.72%	205	33.28%	0	0.00%	0	0.00%	0	0.00%	206	33.44%	616
Cheboygan	262	37.06%	445	62.94%	0	0.00%	0	0.00%	0	0.00%	-183	-25.88%	707
Chippewa (Note: Not included in official canvass)	172	37.80%	283	62.20%	0	0.00%	0	0.00%	0	0.00%	-111	-24.40%	455
Clare	272	53.54%	236	46.46%	0	0.00%	0	0.00%	0	0.00%	36	7.09%	508
Clinton	3,247	51.13%	3,074	48.41%	27	0.43%	2	0.03%	0	0.00%	173	2.72%	6,350
Delta	505	52.77%	452	47.23%	0	0.00%	0	0.00%	0	0.00%	53	5.54%	957
Eaton	4,010	56.65%	2,903	41.01%	65	0.92%	100	1.41%	0	0.00%	1,107	15.64%	7,078
Emmet	312	41.82%	426	57.10%	8	1.07%	0	0.00%	0	0.00%	-114	-15.28%	746
Genesee	5,044	57.25%	3,736	42.41%	7	0.08%	16	0.18%	7	0.08%	1,308	14.85%	8,810
Gladwin	84	34.15%	162	65.85%	0	0.00%	0	0.00%	0	0.00%	-78	-31.71%	246
Grand Traverse	1,000	74.96%	330	24.74%	3	0.22%	1	0.07%	0	0.00%	670	50.22%	1,334
Gratiot	2,150	59.62%	1,312	36.38%	143	3.97%	1	0.03%	0	0.00%	838	23.24%	3,606
Hillsdale	5,109	63.25%	2,329	28.83%	571	7.07%	58	0.72%	11	0.14%	2,780	34.41%	8,078
Houghton	2,266	61.16%	1,439	38.84%	0	0.00%	0	0.00%	0	0.00%	827	22.32%	3,705
Huron	1,269	54.82%	1,036	44.75%	0	0.00%	10	0.43%	0	0.00%	233	10.06%	2,315
Ingham	4,058	50.12%	3,994	49.33%	11	0.14%	32	0.40%	1	0.01%	64	0.79%	8,096
Ionia	4,308	56.28%	3,230	42.20%	68	0.89%	40	0.52%	8	0.10%	1,078	14.08%	7,654
Iosco	467	55.73%	369	44.03%	0	0.00%	2	0.24%	0	0.00%	98	11.69%	838
Isabella	1,022	56.31%	720	39.67%	73	4.02%	0	0.00%	0	0.00%	302	16.64%	1,815
Isle Royale	12	21.43%	44	78.57%	0	0.00%	0	0.00%	0	0.00%	-32	-57.14%	56
Jackson	4,913	47.75%	5,254	51.06%	47	0.46%	75	0.73%	0	0.00%	-341	-3.31%	10,289
Kalamazoo	4,496	54.98%	3,583	43.82%	90	1.10%	8	0.10%	0	0.00%	913	11.17%	8,177
Kalkaska	384	73.28%	130	24.81%	10	1.91%	0	0.00%	0	0.00%	254	48.47%	524
Kent	7,403	48.88%	5,678	37.49%	2,055	13.57%	3	0.02%	7	0.05%	1,725	11.39%	15,146
Keweenaw	735	63.97%	414	36.03%	0	0.00%	0	0.00%	0	0.00%	321	27.94%	1,149
Lake	414	65.61%	209	33.12%	8	1.27%	0	0.00%	0	0.00%	205	32.49%	631
Lapeer	3,229	56.27%	2,498	43.53%	1	0.02%	5	0.09%	5	0.09%	731	12.74%	5,738
Leelanau	634	60.61%	412	39.39%	0	0.00%	0	0.00%	0	0.00%	222	21.22%	1,046
Lenawee	6,540	53.11%	5,564	45.19%	6	0.05%	198	1.61%	5	0.04%	976	7.93%	12,313
Livingston	2,735	48.14%	2,929	51.56%	1	0.02%	11	0.19%	5	0.09%	-194	-3.41%	5,681
Mackinac	74	26.62%	204	73.38%	0	0.00%	0	0.00%	0	0.00%	-130	-46.76%	278
Macomb	3,012	46.42%	3,453	53.21%	18	0.28%	6	0.09%	0	0.00%	-441	-6.80%	6,489
Manistee	896	50.22%	811	45.46%	76	4.26%	0	0.00%	1	0.06%	85	4.76%	1,784
Manitou	40	29.85%	94	70.15%	0	0.00%	0	0.00%	0	0.00%	-54	-40.30%	134
Marquette	2,308	56.88%	1,750	43.12%	0	0.00%	0	0.00%	0	0.00%	558	13.75%	4,058
Mason	933	55.97%	680	40.79%	54	3.24%	0	0.00%	0	0.00%	253	15.18%	1,667
Mecosta	1,342	56.65%	926	39.09%	101	4.26%	0	0.00%	0	0.00%	416	17.56%	2,369
Menominee	393	52.82%	351	47.18%	0	0.00%	0	0.00%	0	0.00%	42	5.65%	744
Midland	655	57.51%	484	42.49%	0	0.00%	0	0.00%	0	0.00%	171	15.01%	1,139
Missaukee	159	59.55%	108	40.45%	0	0.00%	0	0.00%	0	0.00%	51	19.10%	267
Monroe	3,032	43.62%	3,893	56.01%	23	0.33%	1	0.01%	2	0.03%	-861	-12.39%	6,951
Montcalm	3,106	55.15%	2,445	43.41%	77	1.37%	4	0.07%	0	0.00%	661	11.74%	5,632
Muskegon	2,255	57.36%	1,511	38.44%	163	4.15%	2	0.05%	0	0.00%	744	18.93%	3,931
Newaygo	1,315	55.93%	801	34.07%	235	10.00%	0	0.00%	0	0.00%	514	21.86%	2,351
Oakland	5,053	48.32%	5,313	50.81%	51	0.49%	40	0.38%	0	0.00%	-260	-2.49%	10,457
Oceana	1,365	68.35%	599	29.99%	29	1.45%	0	0.00%	4	0.20%	766	38.36%	1,997
Ogemaw	101	53.72%	87	46.28%	0	0.00%	0	0.00%	0	0.00%	14	7.45%	188
Ontonagon	201	38.29%	321	61.14%	3	0.57%	0	0.00%	0	0.00%	-120	-22.86%	525
Osceola	804	46.13%	620	35.57%	297	17.04%	22	1.26%	0	0.00%	184	10.56%	1,743
Otsego	184	55.93%	145	44.07%	0	0.00%	0	0.00%	0	0.00%	39	11.85%	329
Ottawa	3,401	55.84%	2,620	43.01%	70	1.15%	0	0.00%	0	0.00%	781	12.82%	6,091
Presque Isle	153	47.66%	168	52.34%	0	0.00%	0	0.00%	0	0.00%	-15	-4.67%	321
Roscommon	54	22.69%	184	77.31%	0	0.00%	0	0.00%	0	0.00%	-130	-54.62%	238
Saginaw	4,182	46.28%	4,850	53.67%	5	0.06%	0	0.00%	0	0.00%	-668	-7.39%	9,037
Sanilac	1,896	63.33%	1,029	34.37%	66	2.20%	3	0.10%	0	0.00%	867	28.96%	2,994
Schoolcraft	121	52.84%	103	44.98%	5	2.18%	0	0.00%	0	0.00%	18	7.86%	229
Shiawassee	3,191	56.11%	2,469	43.41%	6	0.11%	21	0.37%	0	0.00%	722	12.70%	5,687
St. Clair	4,067	51.49%	3,710	46.97%	113	1.43%	8	0.10%	0	0.00%	357	4.52%	7,898
St. Joseph	3,165	49.43%	2,490	38.89%	748	11.68%	0	0.00%	0	0.00%	675	10.54%	6,403
Tuscola	2,463	63.28%	1,284	32.99%	145	3.73%	0	0.00%	0	0.00%	1,179	30.29%	3,892
Van Buren	4,046	56.60%	2,599	36.36%	501	7.01%	2	0.03%	0	0.00%	1,447	20.24%	7,148
Washtenaw	4,565	47.00%	5,117	52.68%	8	0.08%	23	0.24%	0	0.00%	-552	-5.68%	9,713
Wayne	12,580	43.77%	15,076	52.46%	1,064	3.70%	19	0.07%	0	0.00%	-2,496	-8.69%	28,739
Wexford	618	65.88%	318	33.90%	1	0.11%	1	0.11%	0	0.00%	300	31.98%	938
Total	166,534	52.45%	141,095	44.44%	9,060	2.85%	766	0.24%	75	0.02%	25,439	8.01%	317,530

==== Counties that flipped from Republican to Democratic ====
- Alcona
- Alpena
- Bay
- Cheboygan
- Chippewa
- Jackson
- Livingston
- Macomb
- Manitou
- Monroe
- Oakland
- Ontonagon
- Presque Isle
- Saginaw
- Washtenaw
- Wayne

== See also ==
- United States presidential elections in Michigan
