= 1856 United States presidential election in Michigan =

- November 4, 1856
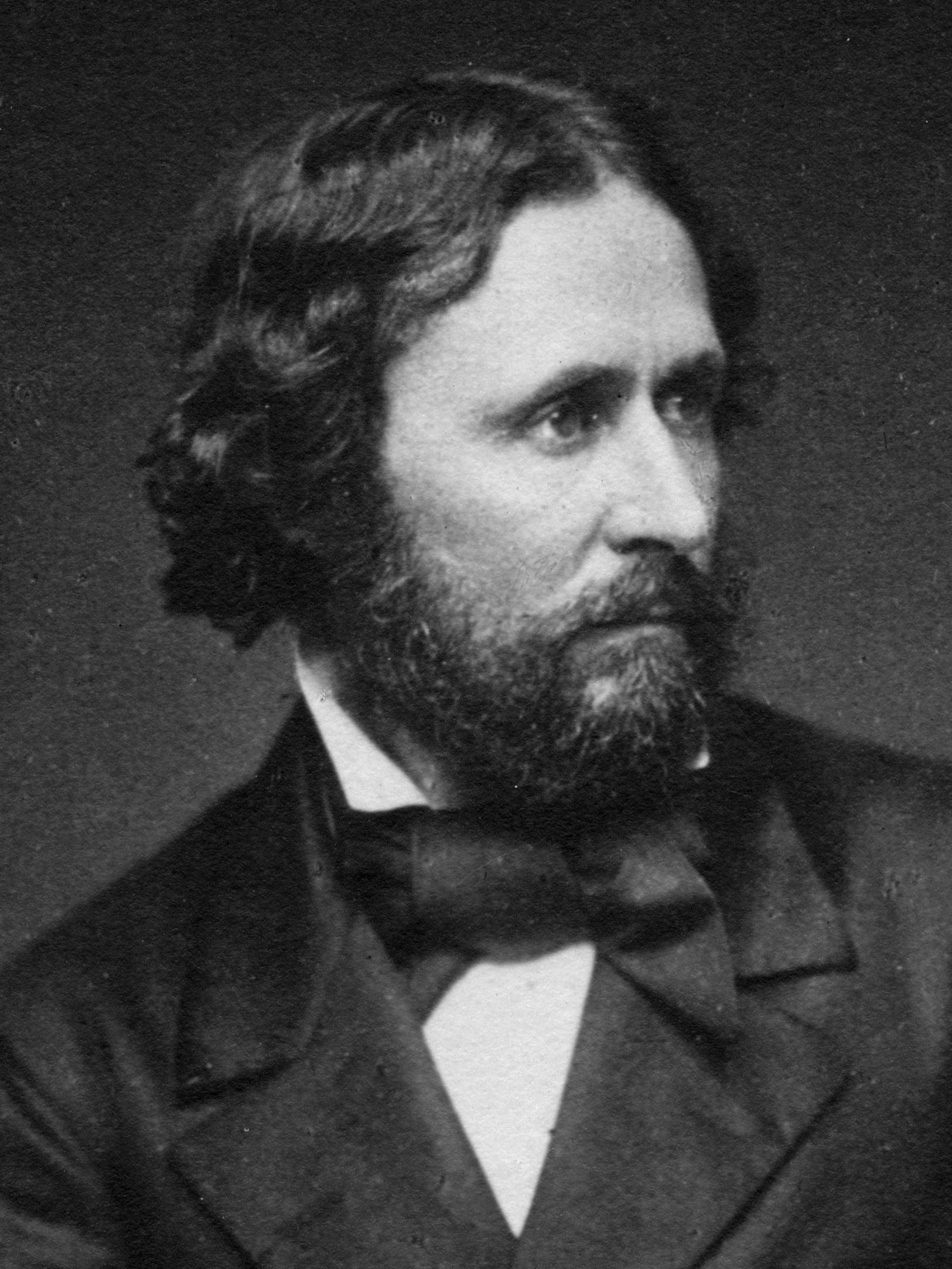

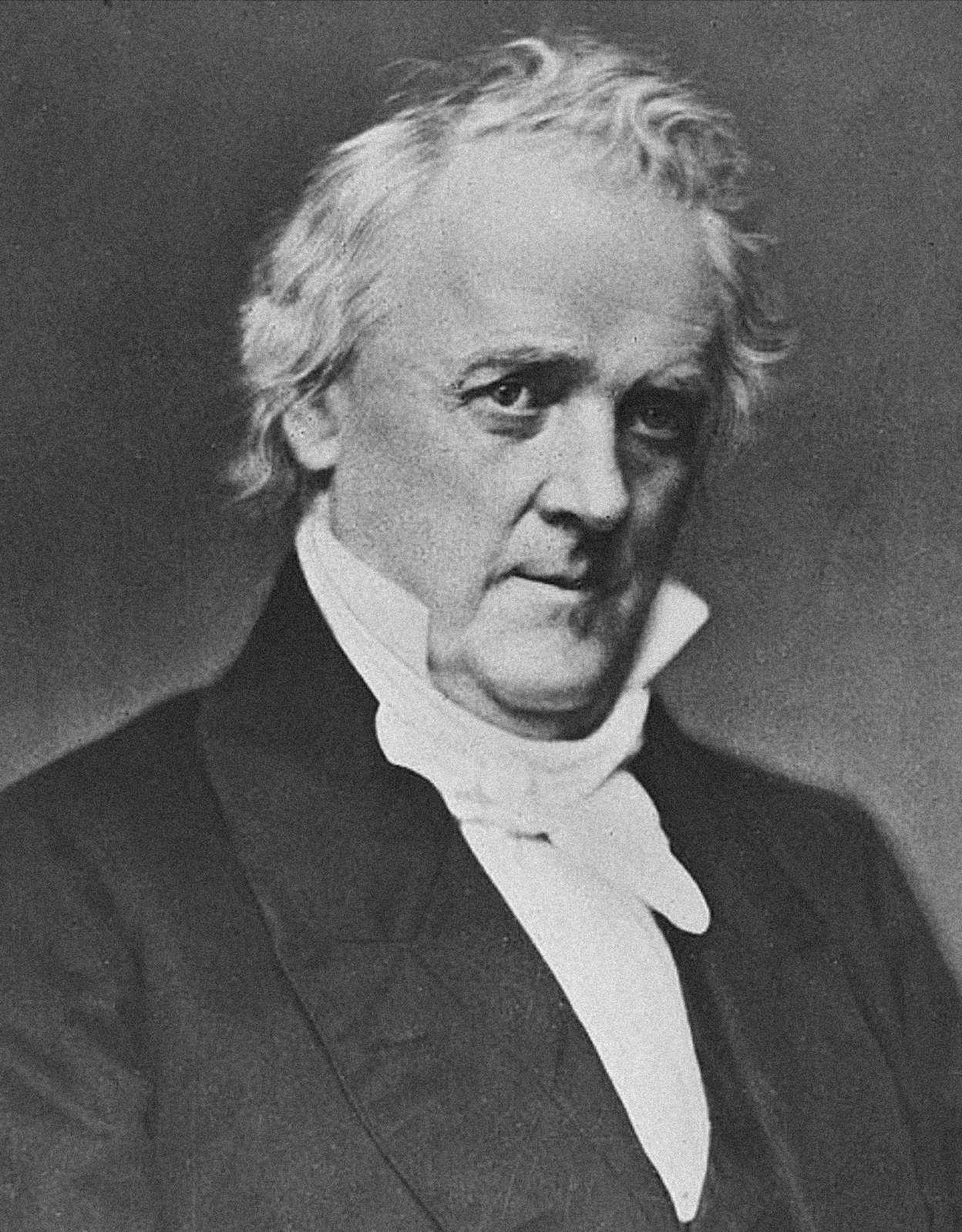
Nominee	John C. Frémont	James Buchanan
Party	Republican	Democratic
Home state	California	Pennsylvania
Running mate	William L. Dayton	John C. Breckinridge
Electoral vote	6	0
Popular vote	71,762	52,139
Percentage	57.08%	41.47%
County results
Frémont
40–50%
50–60%
60–70%
70–80%
Buchanan
50–60%
60–70%
President before election
Franklin Pierce
Democratic
Elected President
James Buchanan
Democratic

The 1856 United States presidential election in Michigan took place on November 4, 1856, as part of the 1856 United States presidential election. Voters chose six representatives, or electors to the Electoral College, who voted for president and vice president.

Michigan voted for the Republican candidate, John C. Frémont, over Democratic candidate, James Buchanan. Frémont won Michigan by a margin of 15.63%.

With 57.15% of the popular vote, Michigan proved to be Fremont's fifth strongest in the 1856 election after Vermont, Massachusetts, Maine and Rhode Island.

This marked the first of eighteen Republican victories in Michigan over the next nineteen presidential election cycles. Michigan would not vote for a Democratic candidate again until Franklin D. Roosevelt in 1932, and it would not vote for a different candidate until Theodore Roosevelt's third-party bid in 1912. Michigan would also not send any Democratic electors to the Electoral College until Grover Cleveland won five of the state's 14 electoral votes in 1892. This is one of only four occasions since the founding of the Republican Party that Michigan and Pennsylvania have voted for different presidential candidates. (Note: The other times were in 1932, 1940, and 1976.)

== Results ==
General Election Results
Party	Pledged to	Elector	Votes
Republican Party	John C. Frémont	Fernando C. Beaman	71,762
Republican Party	John C. Frémont	Thomas J. Drake	71,759
Republican Party	John C. Frémont	William H. Withey	71,759
Republican Party	John C. Frémont	Chauncey H. Millen	71,738
Republican Party	John C. Frémont	Harmon Chamberlin	71,729
Republican Party	John C. Frémont	Oliver Johnson	70,186
Democratic Party	James Buchanan	David A. Noble	52,139
Democratic Party	James Buchanan	Robert Crouse	52,138
Democratic Party	James Buchanan	Jonathan P. King	52,137
Democratic Party	James Buchanan	Michael Shoemaker	52,136
Democratic Party	James Buchanan	John C. Blanchard	52,134
Democratic Party	James Buchanan	DeWitt C. Walker	52,116
American Party	Millard Fillmore	Rodney C. Paine	1,660
American Party	Millard Fillmore	George W. Perkins	1,657
American Party	Millard Fillmore	Henry W. Welles	1,657
American Party	Millard Fillmore	John V. Lyon	1,654
American Party	Millard Fillmore	Peter R. Adams	1,652
American Party	Millard Fillmore	Abram R. Coryell	1,652
Write-in		Scattering	166
Votes cast (Note: Based on highest elector on each ticket)			125,727

=== Results By County ===
County	John C. Frémont Republican		James Buchanan Democratic		Millard Fillmore American		Margin		Total votes cast
County	#	%	#	%	#	%	#	%	Total votes cast
Allegan	1,526	59.06%	1,027	39.74%	29	1.12%	499	19.31%	2,584 (Note: Includes 2 Scattering votes)
Barry	1,495	61.85%	873	36.12%	49	2.03%	622	25.73%	2,417
Berrien	1,926	53.53%	1,540	42.80%	132	3.67%	386	10.73%	3,598
Branch	2,608	65.83%	1,322	33.37%	14	0.35%	1,286	32.46%	3,962 (Note: Includes 18 Scattering votes)
Calhoun	3,495	60.59%	2,151	37.29%	122	2.12%	1,344	23.30%	5,768
Cass	1,703	58.54%	1,165	40.05%	41	1.41%	538	18.49%	2,909
Clinton	1,358	56.44%	1,034	42.98%	14	0.58%	324	13.47%	2,406
Eaton	1,888	60.30%	1,228	39.22%	15	0.48%	660	21.08%	3,131
Genesee	2,635	61.39%	1,538	35.83%	110	2.56%	1,097	25.56%	4,292 (Note: Includes 9 Scattering votes)
Grand Traverse	157	39.05%	243	60.45%	2	0.50%	-86	-21.39%	402
Gratiot	388	74.05%	136	25.95%	0	0.00%	252	48.09%	524
Hillsdale	3,446	70.46%	1,408	28.79%	37	0.76%	2,038	41.67%	4,891
Houghton	201	33.50%	398	66.33%	1	0.17%	-197	-32.83%	600
Ingham	1,849	54.25%	1,534	45.01%	25	0.73%	315	9.24%	3,408
Ionia	2,002	63.00%	1,154	36.31%	22	0.69%	848	26.68%	3,178
Jackson	2,996	57.77%	2,119	40.86%	46	0.89%	877	16.91%	5,186 (Note: Includes 25 Scattering votes)
Kalamazoo	2,803	62.65%	1,620	36.21%	50	1.12%	1,183	26.44%	4,474 (Note: Includes 1 Scattering vote)
Kent	2,931	52.91%	2,516	45.42%	93	1.68%	415	7.49%	5,540
Lapeer	1,579	60.61%	995	38.20%	31	1.19%	584	22.42%	2,605
Lenawee	4,499	60.28%	2,779	37.24%	167	2.24%	1,720	23.05%	7,463
Livingston	1,765	50.52%	1,711	48.97%	18	0.52%	54	1.55%	3,494
Macomb	2,210	54.09%	1,846	45.18%	30	0.73%	364	8.91%	4,086
Marquette	79	44.89%	77	43.75%	20	11.36%	2	1.14%	176
Mason	32	72.73%	12	27.27%	0	0.00%	20	45.45%	44
Midland	169	78.97%	43	20.09%	2	0.93%	126	58.88%	214
Monroe	1,777	50.04%	1,703	47.96%	34	0.96%	74	2.08%	3,551 (Note: Includes 37 Scattering votes)
Montcalm	414	60.35%	265	38.63%	7	1.02%	149	21.72%	686
Oakland	4,105	54.82%	3,276	43.75%	71	0.95%	829	11.07%	7,488 (Note: Includes 36 Scattering votes)
Oceana	82	79.61%	21	20.39%	0	0.00%	61	59.22%	103
Ottawa	1,392	57.31%	998	41.09%	39	1.61%	394	16.22%	2,429
Saginaw	1,042	45.68%	1,222	53.57%	17	0.75%	-180	-7.89%	2,281
Sanilac	803	79.90%	201	20.00%	1	0.10%	602	59.90%	1,005
Shiawassee	1,304	53.33%	1,105	45.19%	36	1.47%	199	8.14%	2,445
St. Clair	1,807	53.92%	1,521	45.39%	21	0.63%	286	8.53%	3,351
St. Joseph	2,324	60.98%	1,475	38.70%	12	0.31%	849	22.28%	3,811
Tuscola	442	64.24%	242	35.17%	4	0.58%	200	29.07%	688
Van Buren	1,710	61.62%	1,031	37.15%	34	1.23%	679	24.47%	2,775
Washtenaw	3,570	54.67%	2,833	43.38%	109	1.67%	737	11.29%	6,530
Wayne	5,250	46.74%	5,777	51.43%	205	1.83%	-527	-4.69%	11,232
Total	71,762	57.08%	52,139	41.47%	1,660	1.32%	19,623	15.61%	125,727

==== Counties that flipped from Democratic to Republican ====
- Allegan
- Barry
- Berrien
- Branch
- Calhoun
- Eaton
- Hillsdale
- Ingham
- Ionia
- Jackson
- Kent
- Lapeer
- Lenawee
- Livingston
- Macomb
- Monroe
- Montcalm
- Oakland
- Ottawa
- Sanilac
- Shiawassee
- St. Clair
- St. Joseph
- Van Buren
- Washtenaw

==== Counties that flipped from Whig to Republican ====
- Cass
- Clinton
- Genesee
- Kalamazoo
- Tuscola

== See also ==
- United States presidential elections in Michigan
