= 1840 United States presidential election in Michigan =

- November 2–3, 1840
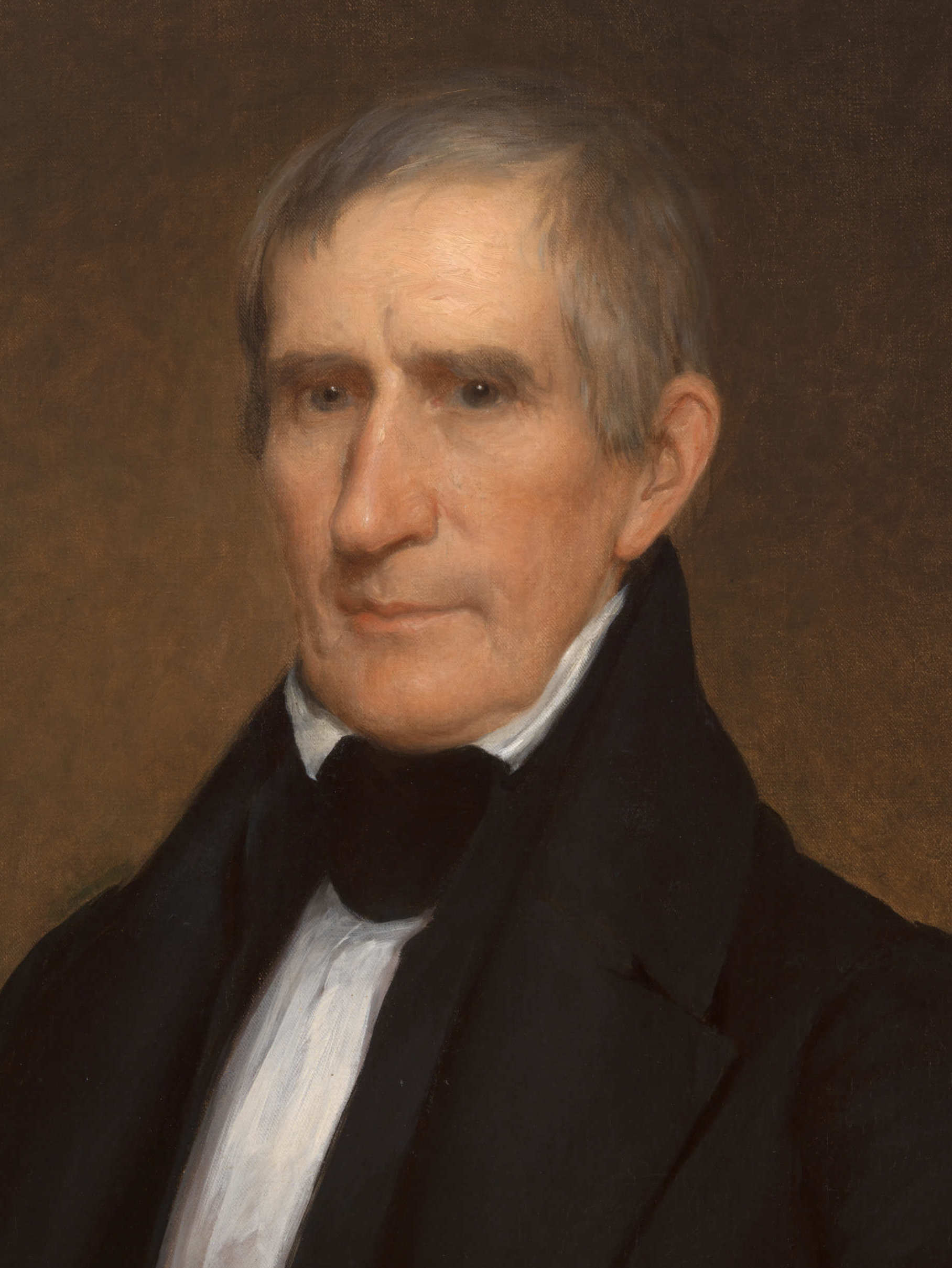

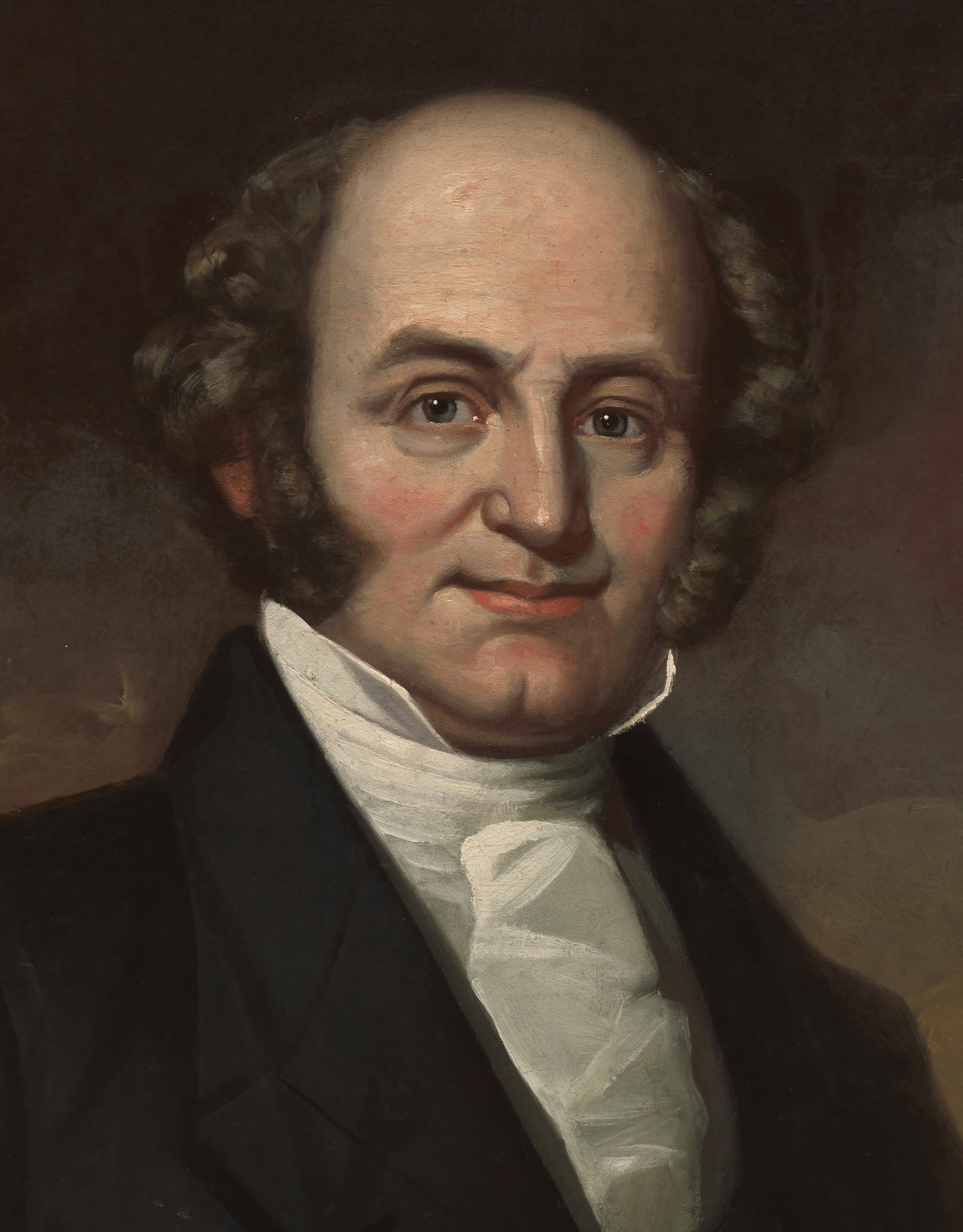
Nominee	William Henry Harrison	Martin Van Buren
Party	Whig	Democratic
Home state	Ohio	New York
Running mate	John Tyler	none
Electoral vote	3	0
Popular vote	22,933	21,096
Percentage	51.71%	47.57%
County results
Harrison
40–50%
50–60%
60–70%
Van Buren
40–50%
50–60%
60–70%
President before election
Martin Van Buren
Democratic
Elected President
William Henry Harrison
Whig

A presidential election was held in Michigan from November 2–3, 1840 as part of the 1840 United States presidential election. Voters chose three representatives, or electors to the Electoral College, who voted for President and Vice President.

Michigan voted for the Whig candidate, William Henry Harrison, over Democratic candidate Martin Van Buren. Harrison won Michigan by a narrow margin of 4.14%. This was the only time Michigan voted for a Whig Party candidate.

== Results ==
General Election Results
Party	Pledged to	Elector	Votes
Whig Party	William Henry Harrison	Hezekiah G. Wells	22,933
Whig Party	William Henry Harrison	Thomas J. Drake	22,912
Whig Party	William Henry Harrison	John Van Fossen	22,821
Democratic Party	Martin Van Buren	Charles Moran	21,096
Democratic Party	Martin Van Buren	Charles E. Stuart	21,096
Democratic Party	Martin Van Buren	Kinsley S. Bingham	21,095
Liberty Party	James G. Birney	Arthur S. Porter	321
Liberty Party	James G. Birney	Thomas McGee	270
Liberty Party	James G. Birney	Augustus L. Porter	253
Votes cast (Note: Based on totals for highest elector on each ticket)			44,350

=== Results by county ===
County	William Henry Harrison Whig		Martin Van Buren Democratic		James G. Birney Liberty		Margin		Total votes cast
County	#	%	#	%	#	%	#	%	Total votes cast
Allegan	257	59.49%	174	40.28%	1	0.23%	83	19.21%	432
Barry	128	54.94%	105	45.06%	0	0.00%	23	9.87%	233
Berrien	548	49.64%	553	50.09%	3	0.27%	-5	-0.45%	1,104
Branch	543	46.41%	616	52.65%	11	0.94%	-73	-6.24%	1,170
Calhoun	1,153	48.96%	1,169	49.64%	33	1.40%	-16	-0.68%	2,355
Cass	670	55.65%	527	43.77%	7	0.58%	143	11.88%	1,204
Clinton	221	60.38%	145	39.62%	0	0.00%	76	20.77%	366
Eaton	337	59.54%	229	40.46%	0	0.00%	108	19.08%	566
Genesee	513	56.62%	380	41.94%	13	1.43%	133	14.68%	906
Hillsdale	843	53.69%	721	45.92%	6	0.38%	122	7.77%	1,570
Ingham	265	50.38%	261	49.62%	0	0.00%	4	0.76%	526
Ionia	266	54.62%	219	44.97%	2	0.41%	47	9.65%	487
Jackson	1,504	55.68%	1,121	41.50%	76	2.81%	383	14.18%	2,701
Kalamazoo	954	55.30%	744	43.13%	27	1.57%	210	12.17%	1,725
Kent	319	49.92%	320	50.08%	0	0.00%	-1	-0.16%	639
Lapeer	492	54.36%	413	45.64%	0	0.00%	79	8.73%	905
Lenawee	2,117	53.06%	1,865	46.74%	8	0.20%	252	6.32%	3,990
Livingston	700	45.34%	844	54.66%	0	0.00%	-144	-9.33%	1,544
Mackinac	85	51.83%	79	48.17%	0	0.00%	6	3.66%	164
Macomb	982	46.63%	1,124	53.37%	0	0.00%	-142	-6.74%	2,106
Monroe	939	47.83%	1,023	52.11%	1	0.05%	-84	-4.28%	1,963
Oakland	2,372	49.92%	2,365	49.77%	15	0.32%	7	0.15%	4,752
Ottawa	81	47.93%	88	52.07%	0	0.00%	-7	-4.14%	169
Saginaw	89	47.09%	100	52.91%	0	0.00%	-11	-5.82%	189
Shiawassee	283	64.03%	159	35.97%	0	0.00%	124	28.05%	442
St. Clair	517	53.69%	446	46.31%	0	0.00%	71	7.37%	963
St. Joseph	800	51.25%	761	48.75%	0	0.00%	39	2.50%	1,561
Van Buren	182	42.03%	251	57.97%	0	0.00%	-69	-15.94%	433
Washtenaw	2,527	54.41%	2,057	44.29%	60	1.29%	470	10.12%	4,644
Wayne	2,246	49.82%	2,237	49.62%	25	0.55%	9	0.20%	4,508
Total	22,933	51.71%	21,096	47.57%	321 (Note: The county figures add up to 288.)	0.72%	1,837	4.15%	44,350

==== Counties that flipped from Democratic to Whig ====
- Allegan
- Genesee
- Hillsdale
- Ingham
- Kalamazoo
- Lapeer
- Lenawee
- St. Joseph
- Washtenaw
- Wayne

==== Counties that flipped from Whig to Democratic ====
- Monroe

== See also ==
- United States presidential elections in Michigan
