= 1848 United States presidential election in Michigan =

- November 7, 1848
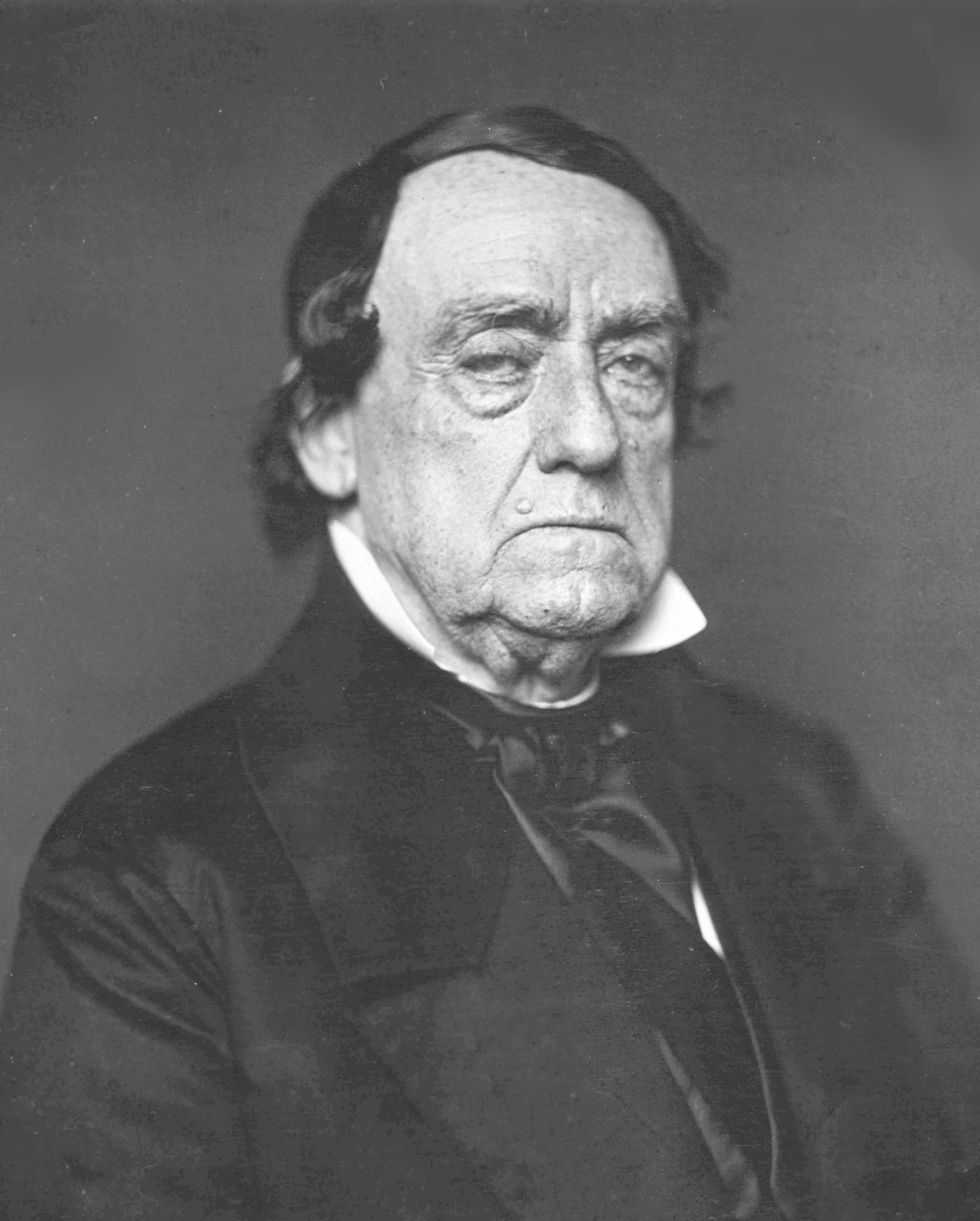

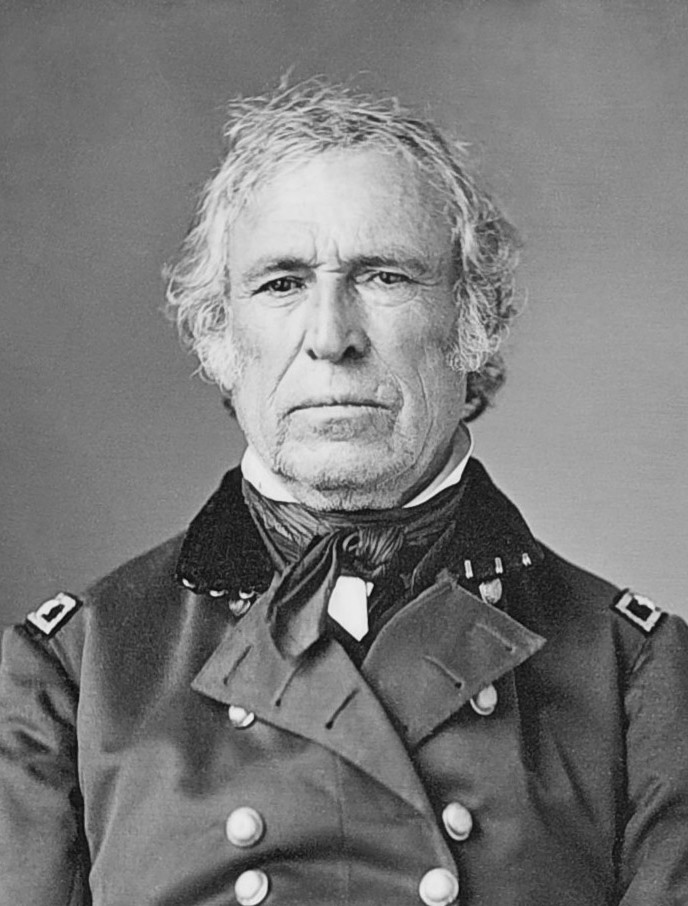

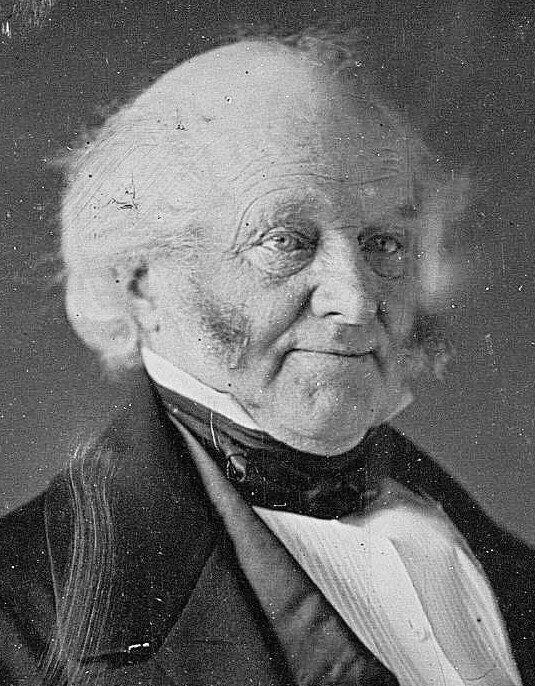
Nominee	Lewis Cass	Zachary Taylor	Martin Van Buren
Party	Democratic	Whig	Free Soil
Home state	Michigan	Louisiana	New York
Running mate	William O. Butler	Millard Fillmore	Charles Francis Adams Sr.
Electoral vote	5	0	0
Popular vote	30,677	23,930	10,393
Percentage	47.20%	36.82%	15.99%
County results
Cass
40–50%
50–60%
70–80%
Taylor
40–50%
50–60%
President before election
James K. Polk
Democratic
Elected President
Zachary Taylor
Whig

The 1848 United States presidential election in Michigan took place on November 7, 1848, as part of the 1848 United States presidential election. Voters chose five representatives, or electors to the Electoral College, who voted for President and Vice President.

Michigan voted for the Democratic candidate, Lewis Cass, over Whig candidate Zachary Taylor and Free Soil candidate Martin Van Buren. Cass won his home state, for which he was serving as a United States Senator, by a margin of 10.44%. This was the last time until 1968 that a Democrat would carry Michigan without winning the presidency.

== Results ==
General Election Results
Party	Pledged to	Elector	Votes
Democratic Party	Lewis Cass	John S. Barry	30,677
Democratic Party	Lewis Cass	Rix Robinson	30,665
Democratic Party	Lewis Cass	William T. Howell	30,548
Democratic Party	Lewis Cass	Horace C. Thurber	30,436
Democratic Party	Lewis Cass	Lorenzo M. Mason	30,371
Whig Party	Zachary Taylor	Jacob M. Howard	23,930
Whig Party	Zachary Taylor	Hezekiah G. Wells	23,918
Whig Party	Zachary Taylor	Henry B. Lathrop	23,915
Whig Party	Zachary Taylor	Henry Waldron	23,865
Whig Party	Zachary Taylor	Hiram L. Miller	23,676
Free Soil Party	Martin Van Buren	James F. Joy	10,393
Free Soil Party	Martin Van Buren	Flavius J. Littlejohn	10,357
Free Soil Party	Martin Van Buren	William Gilmore	10,172
Free Soil Party	Martin Van Buren	Isaac P. Christiancy	9,933
Free Soil Party	Martin Van Buren	Lyman B. Treadwell	9,930
Votes cast (Note: Based on highest elector on each ticket)			65,000

=== Results by county ===
County	Lewis Cass Democratic		Zachary Taylor Whig		Martin Van Buren Free Soil		Margin		Total votes cast
County	#	%	#	%	#	%	#	%	Total votes cast
Allegan	303	40.35%	274	36.48%	174	23.17%	29	3.86%	751
Barry	382	53.20%	243	33.84%	93	12.95%	139	19.36%	718
Berrien	1,146	51.93%	953	43.18%	108	4.89%	193	8.74%	2,207
Branch	1,083	50.42%	665	30.96%	400	18.62%	418	19.46%	2,148
Calhoun	1,487	42.66%	1,254	35.97%	745	21.37%	233	6.68%	3,486
Cass	901	48.05%	783	41.76%	191	10.19%	118	6.29%	1,875
Chippewa	43	45.74%	51	54.26%	0	0.00%	-8	-8.51%	94
Clinton	340	49.71%	213	31.14%	131	19.15%	127	1.57%	684
Eaton	546	48.75%	356	31.79%	218	19.46%	190	16.96%	1,120
Genesee	823	40.84%	877	43.52%	315	15.63%	-54	-2.68%	2,015
Hillsdale	1,290	46.09%	1,027	36.69%	482	17.22%	263	9.40%	2,799
Houghton (Note: Not included in official canvass)	65	79.27%	17	20.73%	0	0.00%	48	58.54%	82
Ingham	692	46.23%	473	31.60%	332	22.18%	219	14.63%	1,497
Ionia	608	41.53%	379	25.89%	477	32.58%	131 (Note: Cass's margin over Van Buren)	8.95%	1,464
Jackson	1,547	43.14%	969	27.02%	1,070	29.84%	477	13.30%	3,586
Kalamazoo	880	36.90%	1,010	42.35%	495	20.75%	-130	-5.45%	2,385
Kent	768	43.69%	653	37.14%	337	19.17%	115	6.54%	1,758
Lapeer	542	48.57%	369	33.06%	205	18.37%	173	15.50%	1,116
Lenawee	2,171	44.74%	1,886	38.87%	795	16.38%	285	5.87%	4,852
Livingston	1,127	51.91%	764	35.19%	280	12.90%	363	16.72%	2,171
Mackinac	127	71.35%	51	28.65%	0	0.00%	76	42.70%	178
Macomb	1,339	55.84%	855	35.65%	204	8.51%	484	20.18%	2,398
Monroe	1,155	49.27%	791	33.75%	398	16.98%	364	15.53%	2,344
Oakland	2,781	51.34%	1,942	35.85%	694	12.81%	839	15.49%	5,417
Ottawa	269	57.85%	143	30.75%	53	11.40%	126	27.10%	465
Saginaw	183	52.59%	118	33.91%	47	13.51%	65	18.68%	348
Shiawassee	426	47.39%	281	31.26%	192	21.36%	145	16.13%	899
St. Clair	814	52.11%	665	42.57%	83	5.31%	149	9.54%	1,562
St. Joseph	1,011	42.27%	963	40.26%	418	17.47%	48	2.01%	2,392
Van Buren	508	51.94%	353	36.09%	117	11.96%	155	15.85%	978
Washtenaw	2,080	41.38%	2,029	40.36%	918	18.26%	51	1.01%	5,027
Wayne	3,305	52.74%	2,540	40.54%	421	6.72%	765	12.21%	6,266
Total (Note: Does not include the votes in Houghton County)	30,677	47.20%	23,930	36.82%	10,393	15.99%	6,747	10.38%	65,000

==== Counties that flipped from Whig to Democratic ====
- Allegan
- Cass
- Eaton
- Ionia
- Saginaw
- Shiawassee

== See also ==
- United States presidential elections in Michigan
