= 1836 United States presidential election in Michigan =

- November 7–8, 1836
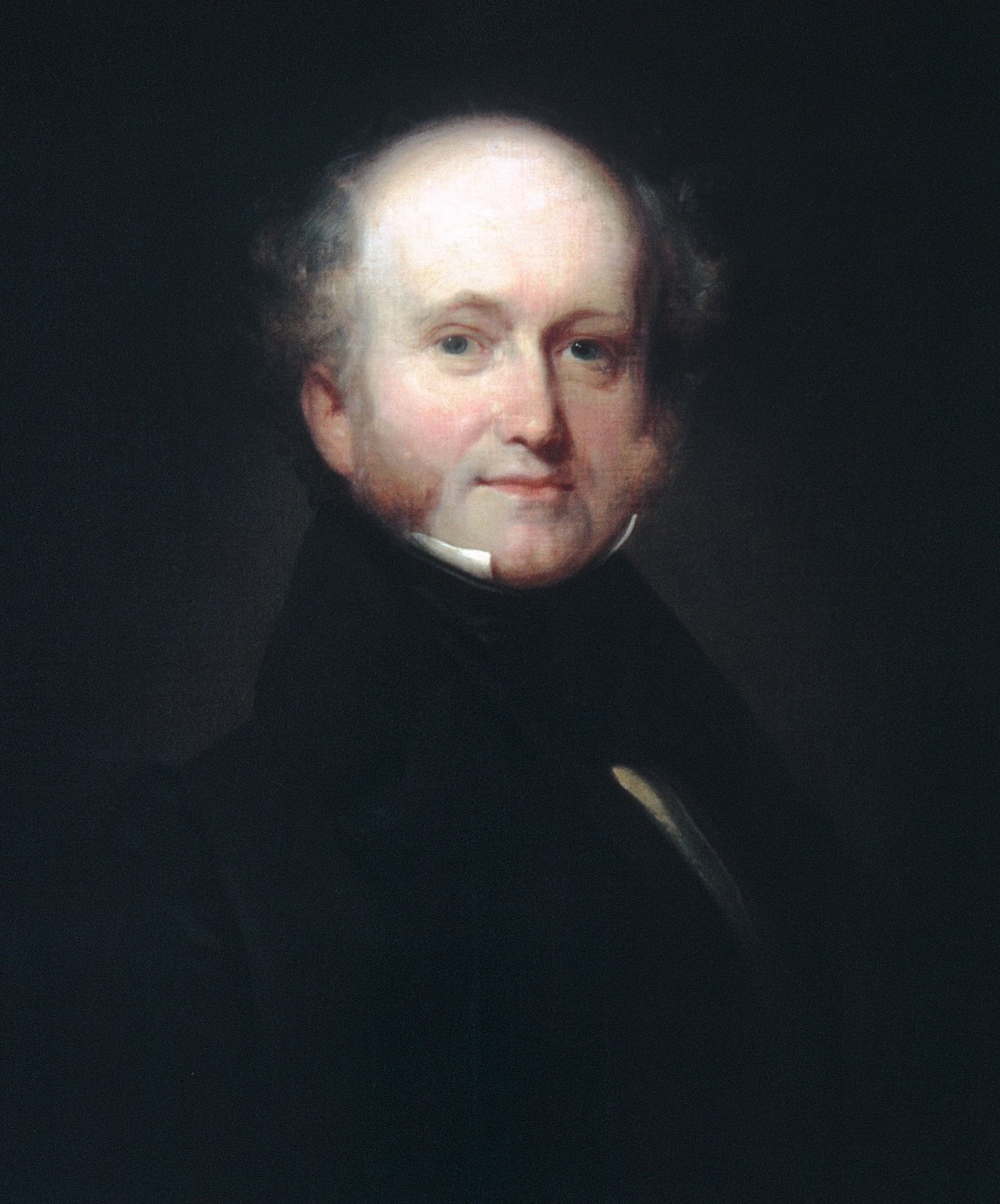

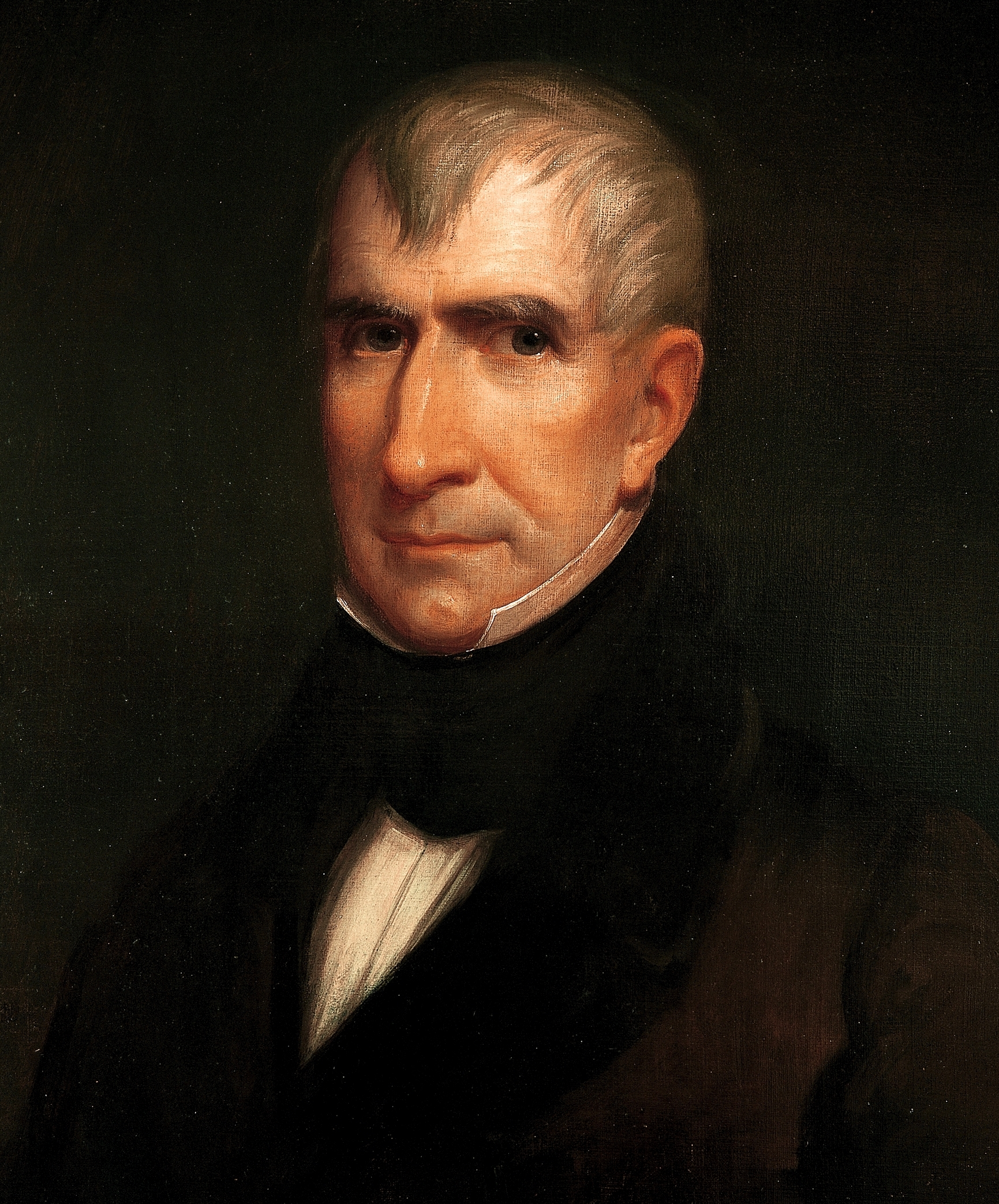
Nominee	Martin Van Buren	William Henry Harrison
Party	Democratic	Whig
Home state	New York	Ohio
Running mate	Richard M. Johnson	Francis Granger
Electoral vote	3	0
Popular vote	7,122	5,545
Percentage	56.22%	43.78%
County results
Van Buren
50–60%
60–70%
80–90%
90–100%
Harrison
50–60%
90–100%
President before election
Andrew Jackson
Democratic
Elected President
Martin Van Buren
Democratic

A presidential election was held in Michigan on November 7 and 8, 1836 as part of the 1836 United States presidential election. Voters chose three representatives, or electors to the Electoral College, who voted for President and Vice President.

Michigan voted for the Democratic candidate, Martin Van Buren, over Whig candidate William Henry Harrison in the state's first presidential election. Van Buren won the state by a margin of 12.44%.

A dispute similar to that of Indiana in 1817 and Missouri in 1821 arose during the counting of the electoral votes. Michigan only became a state on January 26, 1837, and had cast its electoral votes for president before that date. Anticipating a challenge to the results, Congress resolved on February 4, 1837, that during the counting four days later the final tally would be read twice, once with Michigan and once without Michigan. The counting proceeded in accordance with the resolution. The dispute had no bearing on the final result: either way Van Buren was elected, and either way no candidate had a majority for vice-president.

== Results ==
1836 United States presidential election in Michigan (Note: There is considerable disagreement among sources about the results in Michigan for this election. The official Michigan Manuals themselves offer contradictory figures; the results below are taken from the county results, but in a historical summary table, the same source gives the totals as Van Buren 7,332 and Harrison 4,045.)
Party	Candidate	Votes	%
Democratic	Martin Van Buren	7,122	56.22%
Whig	William Henry Harrison	5,545	43.78%
Total votes		12,667	100.00%

=== Results by county ===
County	Martin Van Buren Democratic		William Henry Harrison Whig		Margin		Total votes cast
County	#	%	#	%	#	%	Total votes cast
Allegan	92	100.00%	0	0.00%	92	100.00%	92
Berrien	408	99.27%	3	0.73%	405	98.54%	411
Branch	23	100.00%	0	0.00%	23	100.00%	23
Calhoun	360 (Note: Reported only as a majority for Van Buren, not an actual vote total.)	100.00%	0	0.00%	360	100.00%	360
Genesee	123	57.48%	91	42.52%	32	14.95%	214
Hillsdale	179	96.24%	7	3.76%	172	92.47%	186
Ingham (Note: Includes Jackson)	355	50.14%	353	49.86%	2	0.28%	708
Kalamazoo	213	100.00%	0	0.00%	213	100.00%	213
Lapeer	129	69.35%	57	30.65%	72	38.71%	186
Lenawee	558	68.13%	261	31.87%	297	36.26%	819
Livingston	142	66.05%	73	33.95%	69	32.09%	215
Macomb	400	90.29%	43	9.71%	357	80.59%	443
Monroe	2	0.17%	1,147	99.83%	-1,145	-99.65%	1,149
Oakland	817	46.18%	952	53.82%	-135	-7.63%	1,769
Saginaw	65	100.00%	0	0.00%	65	100.00%	65
St. Joseph	42	100.00%	0	0.00%	42	100.00%	42
Washtenaw	1,636	61.34%	27	38.66%	605	22.68%	2,667
Wayne	1,578	50.82%	1,527	49.18%	51	1.64%	3,105
Total	7,122	56.22%	5,545	43.78%	1,577	12.45%	12,667

The state's official source reports no votes in the following counties: Cass, Chippewa, Jackson (voted with Ingham), Kent, Mackinac, St. Clair, and Van Buren. Some sources do give results for these counties, however.

County	Martin Van Buren Democratic		William Henry Harrison Whig		Margin		Total votes cast
County	#	%	#	%	#	%	Total votes cast
Cass	164	100.00%	0	0.00%	164	100.00%	164
Chippewa	37	100.00%	0	0.00%	37	100.00%	37
Kent	55	100.00%	0	0.00%	55	100.00%	55
St. Clair	93	98.94%	1	1.06%	92	97.88%	94
Van Buren	64	100.00%	0	0.00%	64	100.00%	64

== See also ==
- United States presidential elections in Michigan
