= 1872 United States presidential election in Michigan =

- November 5, 1872
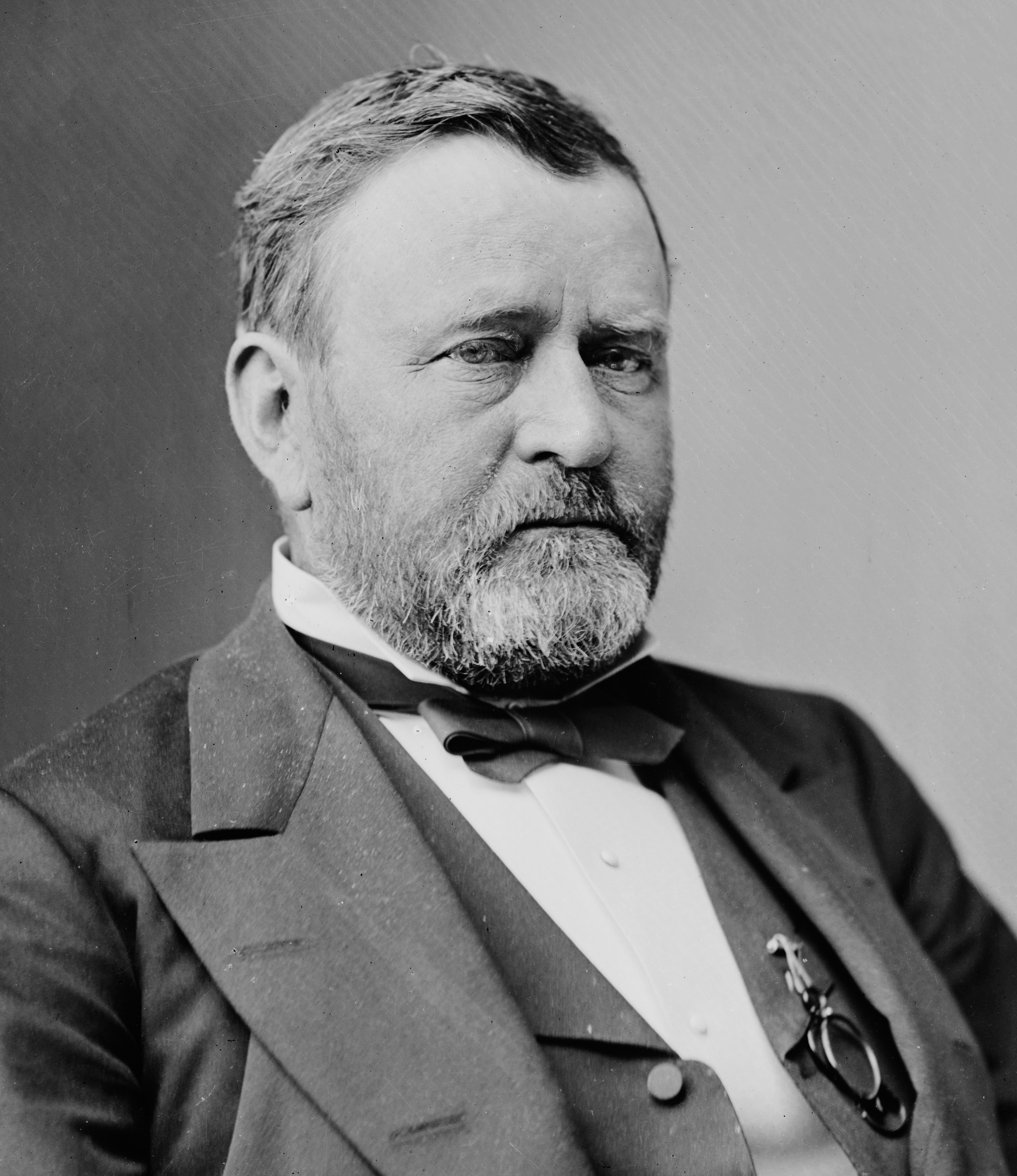

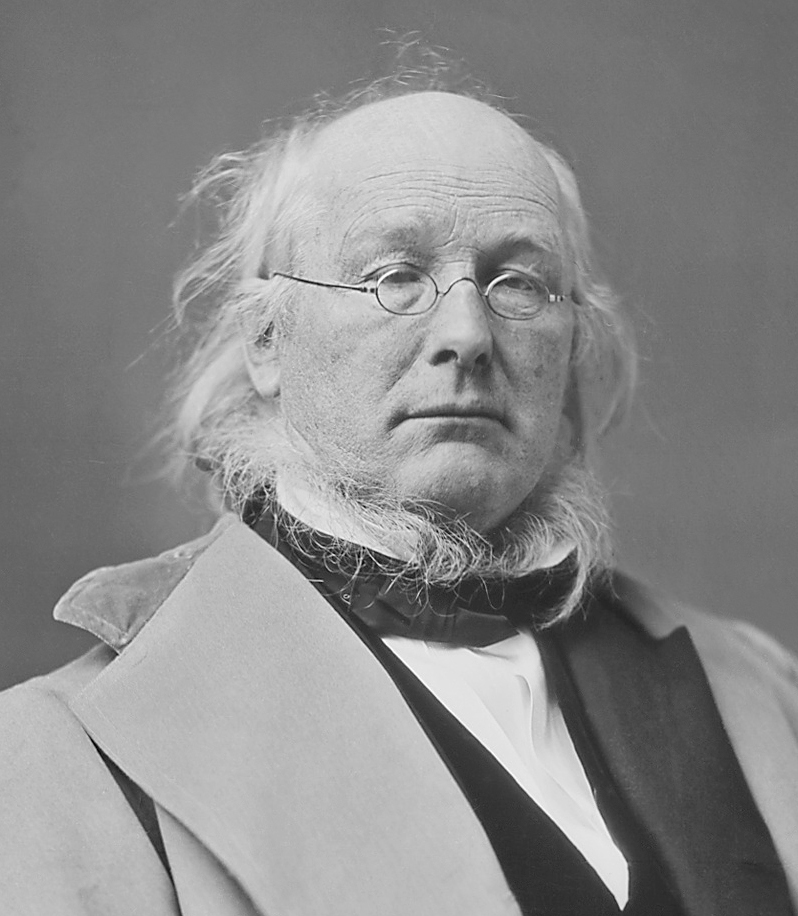
Nominee	Ulysses S. Grant	Horace Greeley
Party	Republican	Liberal Republican
Home state	Illinois	New York
Running mate	Henry Wilson	Benjamin G. Brown
Electoral vote	11	0
Popular vote	136,199	77,020
Percentage	62.65%	35.43%
County results
Grant
50–60%
60–70%
70–80%
80–90%
90–100%
Greeley
50–60%
60–70%
President before election
Ulysses S. Grant
Republican
Elected President
Ulysses S. Grant
Republican

The 1872 United States presidential election in Michigan took place on November 5, 1872, as part of the 1872 United States presidential election. Voters chose 11 electors to the Electoral College, which selected the president and vice president.

Michigan again went for Republican incumbent Ulysses S. Grant, increasing his margin of victory over his challenger (Liberal Republican Horace Greeley) to more than 27%.

== Results ==
General Election Results
Party	Pledged to	Elector	Votes
Republican Party	Ulysses S. Grant	Charles L. Ortmann	136,199
Republican Party	Ulysses S. Grant	Samuel G. Ives	136,198
Republican Party	Ulysses S. Grant	Eber B. Ward	136,197
Republican Party	Ulysses S. Grant	William A. Howard	136,090
Republican Party	Ulysses S. Grant	James O'Donnell	135,934
Republican Party	Ulysses S. Grant	Alonzo Sessions	135,257
Republican Party	Ulysses S. Grant	Frederick Walldorf	134,799
Republican Party	Ulysses S. Grant	John L. Woods	133,747
Republican Party	Ulysses S. Grant	John F. Brown	133,443
Republican Party	Ulysses S. Grant	Lawson A. Duncan	130,915
Republican Party	Ulysses S. Grant	Hermann Kiefer	107,460 (Note: There were also 25,770 votes recorded for "Herman Keifer")
Liberal Republican Party	Horace Greeley	Charles S. May	77,020
Liberal Republican Party	Horace Greeley	Randolph Strickland	77,012
Liberal Republican Party	Horace Greeley	Charles B. Fenton	76,820
Liberal Republican Party	Horace Greeley	John Wahl	76,691
Liberal Republican Party	Horace Greeley	Otto Starck	76,648
Liberal Republican Party	Horace Greeley	Henry Chamberlain	76,259
Liberal Republican Party	Horace Greeley	George V. N. Lothrop	76,172
Liberal Republican Party	Horace Greeley	Henry Fralick	75,645
Liberal Republican Party	Horace Greeley	Abram Smith	74,044
Liberal Republican Party	Horace Greeley	Charles Babo	72,913
Liberal Republican Party	Horace Greeley	Andrew J. Browne	68,791
Straight-Out Democratic	Charles O'Conor	Rix Robinson	2,861
Straight-Out Democratic	Charles O'Conor	Daniel B. Hibbard	2,860
Straight-Out Democratic	Charles O'Conor	Ezra Smith	2,860
Straight-Out Democratic	Charles O'Conor	Benjamin S. Retan	2,857
Straight-Out Democratic	Charles O'Conor	Henry A. Davis	2,841
Straight-Out Democratic	Charles O'Conor	William E. Warner	2,827
Straight-Out Democratic	Charles O'Conor	Ira J. Hagaman	2,761
Straight-Out Democratic	Charles O'Conor	Martin N. Hine	2,639
Straight-Out Democratic	Charles O'Conor	Avril Harris	2,503
Straight-Out Democratic	Charles O'Conor	Lewis S. Johnston	2,342
Straight-Out Democratic	Charles O'Conor	Austin Wales	2,841
Prohibition Party	James Black	Charles P. Russell	1,271
Prohibition Party	James Black	John Strong Jr.	1,263
Prohibition Party	James Black	Oscar D. Spaulding	1,253
Prohibition Party	James Black	Thomas A. Granger	1,246
Prohibition Party	James Black	Thomas S. Skinner	1,246
Prohibition Party	James Black	John F. A. Skinner	1,227
Prohibition Party	James Black	Charles K. Carpenter	1,217
Prohibition Party	James Black	Jesse Lee Stout	1,182
Prohibition Party	James Black	Luman R. Atwater	1,170
Prohibition Party	James Black	Jesse M. Miller	1,165
Prohibition Party	James Black	Jacob Sagendorph	1,110
Write-in		Scattering	28
		Blank	11
Votes cast (Note: Based on highest elector on each ticket)			217,390

=== Results By County ===
County	Ulysses S. Grant Republican		Horace Greeley Liberal Republican		Charles O'Conor Democratic		James Black Prohibition		Margin		Total votes cast
County	#	%	#	%	#	%	#	%	#	%	Total votes cast
Alcona	115	90.55%	12	9.45%	0	0.00%	0	0.00%	103	81.10%	127
Allegan	3,473	67.74%	1,598	31.17%	55	1.07%	0	0.00%	1,875	36.57%	5,127 (Note: Includes 1 Scattering vote)
Alpena	508	62.10%	302	36.92%	6	0.73%	2	0.24%	206	25.18%	818
Antrim	284	80.23%	70	19.77%	0	0.00%	0	0.00%	214	60.45%	354
Barry	2,677	67.55%	1,202	30.33%	46	1.16%	38	0.96%	1,475	37.22%	3,963
Bay	1,948	59.39%	1,270	38.72%	16	0.49%	46	1.40%	678	20.67%	3,280
Benzie	450	87.38%	57	11.07%	8	1.55%	0	0.00%	393	76.31%	515
Berrien	3,902	61.83%	2,274	36.03%	113	1.79%	0	0.00%	1,628	25.80%	6,311 (Note: Includes 22 Scattering votes)
Branch	3,492	73.81%	1,130	23.89%	66	1.40%	43	0.91%	2,362	49.93%	4,731
Calhoun	4,486	63.54%	2,350	33.29%	100	1.42%	124	1.76%	2,136	30.25%	7,060
Cass	2,432	56.72%	1,830	42.68%	24	0.56%	2	0.05%	602	14.04%	4,288
Charlevoix	264	96.00%	11	4.00%	0	0.00%	0	0.00%	253	92.00%	275
Cheboygan (Note: Not included in official canvass)	234	56.66%	176	42.62%	3	0.73%	0	0.00%	58	14.04%	413
Chippewa	171	76.00%	54	24.00%	0	0.00%	0	0.00%	117	52.00%	225
Clare	216	67.29%	104	32.40%	1	0.31%	0	0.00%	112	34.89%	321
Clinton	2,505	58.65%	1,734	40.60%	16	0.37%	16	0.37%	771	18.05%	4,271
Delta	439	78.53%	120	21.47%	0	0.00%	0	0.00%	319	57.07%	559
Eaton	3,202	63.06%	1,635	32.20%	47	0.93%	194	3.82%	1,567	30.86%	5,078
Emmet	63	31.19%	139	68.81%	0	0.00%	0	0.00%	-76	-37.62%	202
Genesee	3,987	65.87%	1,962	32.41%	56	0.93%	48	0.79%	2,025	33.45%	6,053
Grand Traverse	704	82.34%	149	17.43%	2	0.23%	0	0.00%	555	64.91%	855
Gratiot	1,482	71.56%	577	27.86%	11	0.53%	1	0.05%	905	43.70%	2,071
Hillsdale	4,579	73.10%	1,520	24.27%	118	1.88%	47	0.75%	3,059	48.83%	6,264
Houghton	1,356	59.14%	928	40.47%	9	0.39%	0	0.00%	428	18.67%	2,293
Huron	872	71.24%	343	28.02%	9	0.74%	0	0.00%	529	43.22%	1,224
Ingham	3,450	59.65%	2,265	39.16%	38	0.66%	31	0.54%	1,185	20.49%	5,784
Ionia	3,326	65.10%	1,702	33.31%	53	1.04%	28	0.55%	1,624	31.79%	5,109
Iosco	420	69.88%	167	27.79%	10	1.66%	4	0.67%	253	42.10%	601
Isabella	718	73.19%	260	26.50%	3	0.31%	0	0.00%	458	46.69%	981
Jackson	4,093	52.72%	3,485	44.89%	46	0.59%	138	1.78%	608	7.83%	7,764 (Note: Includes 2 Scattering votes)
Kalamazoo	4,007	61.58%	2,403	36.93%	84	1.29%	13	0.20%	1,604	24.65%	6,507
Kalkaska	103	97.17%	3	2.83%	0	0.00%	0	0.00%	100	94.34%	106
Kent	5,917	64.89%	3,089	33.88%	98	1.07%	14	0.15%	2,828	31.02%	9,118
Keweenaw	353	53.98%	296	45.26%	5	0.76%	0	0.00%	57	8.72%	654
Lake	222	91.74%	20	8.26%	0	0.00%	0	0.00%	202	83.47%	242
Lapeer	2,486	64.09%	1,367	35.24%	10	0.26%	16	0.41%	1,119	28.85%	3,879
Leelanau	504	73.04%	184	26.67%	0	0.00%	1	0.14%	320	46.38%	690
Lenawee	5,788	62.02%	3,343	35.82%	166	1.78%	36	0.39%	2,445	26.20%	9,333
Livingston	2,335	53.54%	1,912	43.84%	113	2.59%	1	0.02%	423	9.70%	4,361
Mackinac	73	42.44%	99	57.56%	0	0.00%	0	0.00%	-26	-15.12%	172
Macomb	2,446	51.35%	2,160	45.35%	72	1.51%	85	1.78%	286	6.00%	4,763
Manistee	785	63.93%	424	34.53%	8	0.65%	11	0.90%	361	29.40%	1,228
Manitou	75	100.00%	0	0.00%	0	0.00%	0	0.00%	75	100.00%	75
Marquette	1,909	71.71%	743	27.91%	10	0.38%	0	0.00%	1,166	43.80%	2,662
Mason	679	69.78%	268	27.54%	26	2.67%	0	0.00%	411	42.24%	973
Mecosta	1,103	77.24%	319	22.34%	3	0.21%	3	0.21%	784	54.90%	1,428
Menominee	435	78.10%	122	21.90%	0	0.00%	0	0.00%	313	56.19%	557
Midland	759	72.29%	253	24.10%	28	2.67%	10	0.95%	506	48.19%	1,050
Missaukee	111	93.28%	8	6.72%	0	0.00%	0	0.00%	103	86.55%	119
Monroe	2,645	53.88%	2,192	44.65%	72	1.47%	0	0.00%	453	9.23%	4,909
Montcalm	2,010	72.51%	750	27.06%	11	0.40%	1	0.04%	1,260	45.45%	2,772
Muskegon	1,772	71.80%	686	27.80%	8	0.32%	0	0.00%	1,086	44.00%	2,468
Newaygo	792	79.84%	177	17.84%	19	1.92%	4	0.40%	615	62.00%	992
Oakland	4,490	55.47%	3,326	41.09%	202	2.50%	76	0.94%	1,164	14.38%	8,094
Oceana	1,158	82.42%	196	13.95%	51	3.63%	0	0.00%	962	68.47%	1,405
Ontonagon	218	57.52%	161	42.48%	0	0.00%	0	0.00%	57	15.04%	379
Osceola	546	72.32%	175	23.18%	27	3.58%	7	0.93%	371	49.14%	755
Ottawa	2,630	67.19%	1,163	29.71%	110	2.81%	0	0.00%	1,467	37.48%	3,914 (Note: Includes 11 Blank votes)
Presque Isle	132	100.00%	0	0.00%	0	0.00%	0	0.00%	132	100.00%	132
Saginaw	3,674	56.73%	2,653	40.97%	139	2.15%	10	0.15%	1,021	15.77%	6,476
Sanilac	1,335	75.68%	398	22.56%	22	1.25%	9	0.51%	937	53.12%	1,764
Schoolcraft	277	94.54%	16	5.46%	0	0.00%	0	0.00%	261	89.08%	293
Shiawassee	2,777	62.84%	1,522	34.44%	82	1.86%	38	0.86%	1,255	28.40%	4,419
St. Clair	3,322	59.05%	2,234	39.71%	21	0.37%	49	0.87%	1,088	19.34%	5,626
St. Joseph	3,154	62.55%	1,791	35.52%	91	1.80%	6	0.12%	1,363	27.03%	5,042
Tuscola	1,820	73.48%	575	23.21%	39	1.57%	43	1.74%	1,245	50.26%	2,477
Van Buren	3,549	64.21%	1,805	32.66%	162	2.93%	11	0.20%	1,744	31.55%	5,527
Washtenaw	4,106	56.54%	3,029	41.71%	116	1.60%	11	0.15%	1,077	14.83%	7,262
Wayne	12,186	56.01%	9,289	42.70%	227	1.04%	54	0.25%	2,897	13.32%	21,756
Wexford	277	78.92%	74	21.08%	0	0.00%	0	0.00%	203	57.83%	351
Total	136,199	62.65%	77,020	35.43%	2,861	1.32%	1,271	0.58%	59,179	27.22%	217,390

==== Counties that flipped from Democratic to Republican ====
- Cheboygan
- Delta
- Houghton
- Keweenaw
- Livingston
- Manitou
- Monroe
- Ontonagon
- Washtenaw
- Wayne

== See also ==
- United States presidential elections in Michigan
