= 1868 United States presidential election in Michigan =

- November 3, 1868
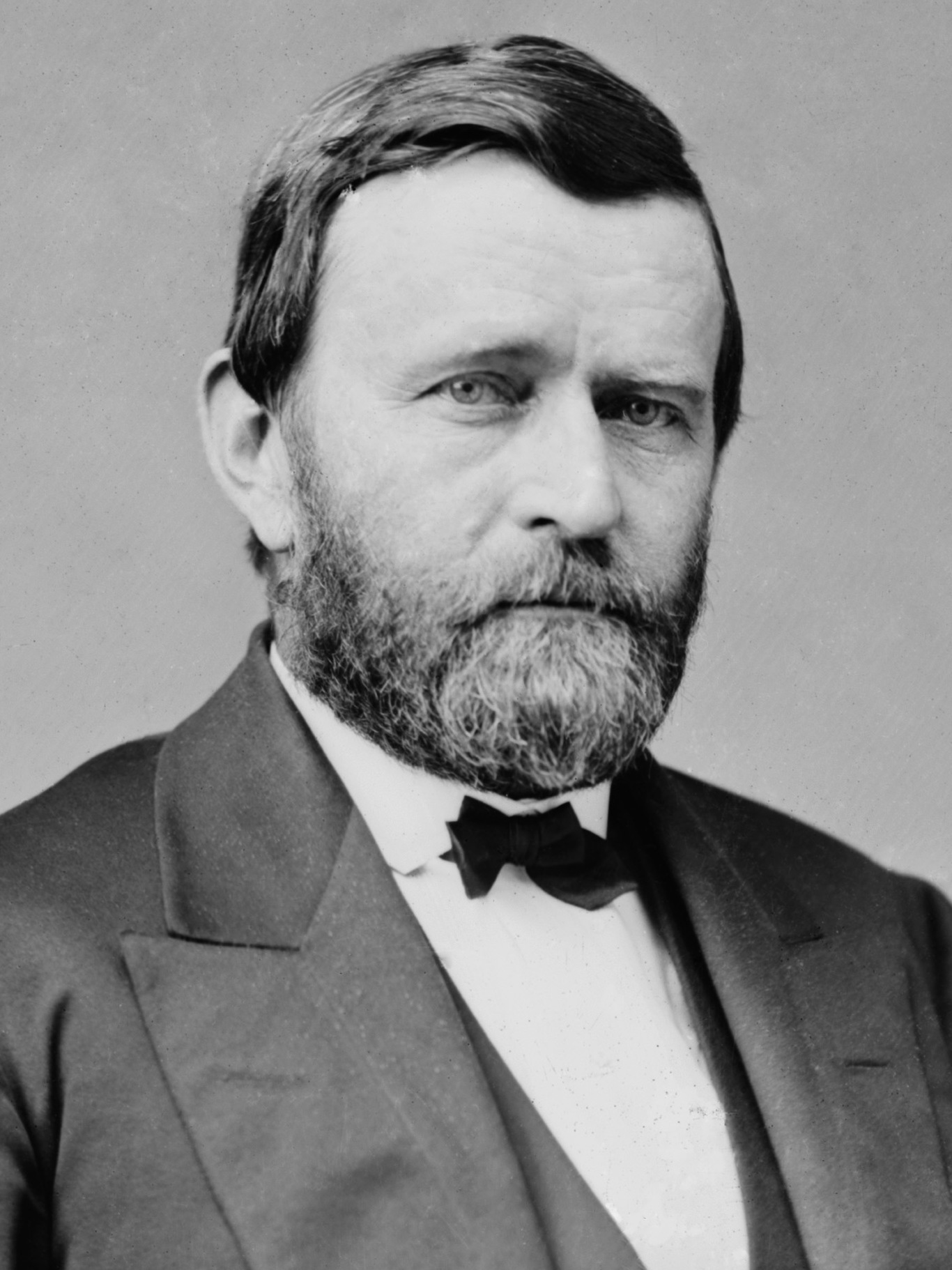

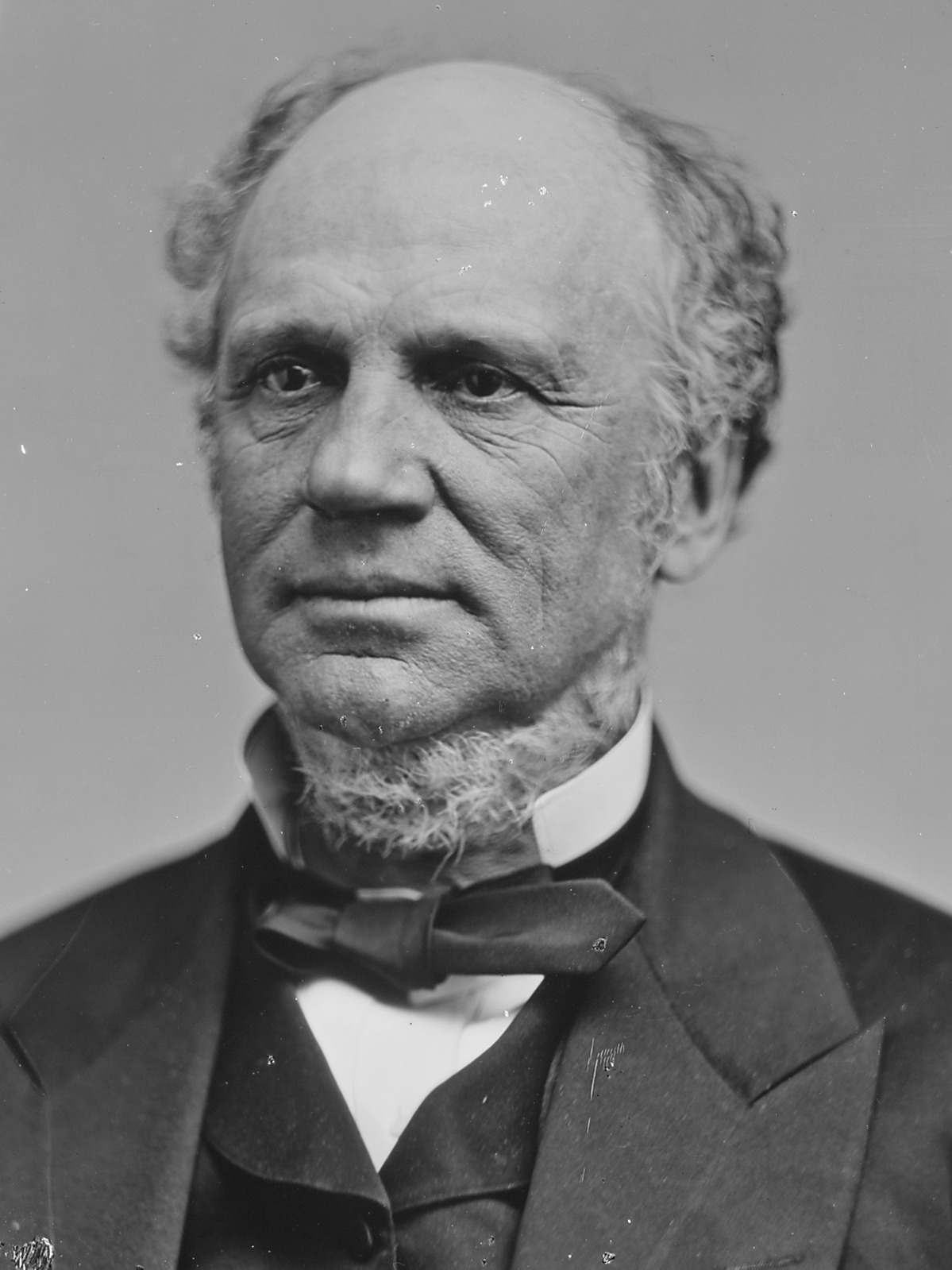
Nominee	Ulysses S. Grant	Horatio Seymour
Party	Republican	Democratic
Home state	Illinois	New York
Running mate	Schuyler Colfax	Francis Preston Blair Jr.
Electoral vote	8	0
Popular vote	113,229	82,364
Percentage	57.89%	42.11%
County results
Grant
50–60%
60–70%
70–80%
80–90%
Seymour
50–60%
60–70%
70–80%
President before election
Andrew Johnson
Democratic
Elected President
Ulysses S. Grant
Republican

The 1868 United States presidential election in Michigan took place on November 3, 1868, as part of the 1868 United States presidential election. Voters chose eight electors to the Electoral College, which selected the president and vice president.

Michigan was won by Republican nominee General Ulysses S. Grant over Democratic candidate Governor Horatio Seymour by a margin of almost 15%.

== Results ==
General Election Results
Party	Pledged to	Elector	Votes
Republican Party	Ulysses S. Grant	Charles M. Croswell	113,229
Republican Party	Ulysses S. Grant	Byron M. Cutcheon	113,228
Republican Party	Ulysses S. Grant	John Burt	113,227
Republican Party	Ulysses S. Grant	William Doelig	113,203
Republican Party	Ulysses S. Grant	Charles T. Gorham	113,201
Republican Party	Ulysses S. Grant	Michael C. T. Plessner	113,200
Republican Party	Ulysses S. Grant	Giles Hubbard	113,198
Republican Party	Ulysses S. Grant	Charles W. Clisbee	113,192
Democratic Party	Horatio Seymour	William M. Ferry	82,364
Democratic Party	Horatio Seymour	Edward Kanter	82,363
Democratic Party	Horatio Seymour	George B. Turner	82,362
Democratic Party	Horatio Seymour	Fidus Livermore	82,361
Democratic Party	Horatio Seymour	Frederick V. Smith	82,336
Democratic Party	Horatio Seymour	Peter White	82,331
Democratic Party	Horatio Seymour	Michael E. Crofoot	82,281
Democratic Party	Horatio Seymour	William R. Stafford	82,073
Write-in		Scattering	2
Votes cast (Note: Based on highest elector on each ticket)			195,595

=== Results By County ===
County	Ulysses S. Grant Republican		Horatio Seymour Democratic		Margin		Total votes cast
County	#	%	#	%	#	%	Total votes cast
Allegan	3,556	60.20%	2,351	39.80%	1,205	20.40%	5,907
Alpena (Note: Not included in official canvass)	321	59.67%	217	40.33%	104	19.33%	538
Antrim	245	85.07%	43	14.93%	202	70.14%	288
Barry	2,923	65.25%	1,557	34.75%	1,366	30.49%	4,480
Bay	1,176	52.10%	1,081	47.90%	95	4.21%	2,257
Berrien	3,993	54.99%	3,268	45.01%	725	9.98%	7,261
Branch	3,964	66.20%	2,024	33.80%	1,940	32.40%	5,988
Calhoun	5,048	61.20%	3,200	38.80%	1,848	22.41%	8,248
Cass	2,471	56.20%	1,926	43.80%	545	12.39%	4,397
Cheboygan	59	28.23%	150	71.77%	-91	-43.54%	209
Clinton	2,586	57.11%	1,942	42.89%	644	14.22%	4,528
Delta	156	49.21%	161	50.79%	-5	-1.58%	317
Eaton	3,088	60.27%	2,036	39.73%	1,052	20.53%	5,124
Emmet	135	40.54%	198	59.46%	-63	-18.92%	333
Genesee	4,241	61.28%	2,680	38.72%	1,561	22.55%	6,921
Grand Traverse	992	85.59%	167	14.41%	825	71.18%	1,159
Gratiot	1,240	62.34%	749	37.66%	491	24.69%	1,989
Hillsdale	4,891	69.83%	2,113	30.17%	2,778	39.66%	7,004
Houghton	708	37.90%	1,160	62.10%	-452	-24.20%	1,868
Huron	698	59.40%	477	40.60%	221	18.81%	1,175
Ingham	3,004	54.47%	2,511	45.53%	493	8.94%	5,515
Ionia	3,503	62.08%	2,140	37.92%	1,363	24.15%	5,643
Iosco	281	61.35%	177	38.65%	104	22.71%	458
Isabella	529	59.51%	360	40.49%	169	19.01%	889
Jackson	4,034	52.64%	3,630	47.36%	404	5.27%	7,664
Kalamazoo	4,073	57.99%	2,951	42.01%	1,122	15.97%	7,024
Kent	5,412	58.50%	3,839	41.50%	1,573	17.00%	9,251
Keweenaw	377	47.84%	411	52.16%	-34	-4.31%	788
Lapeer	2,386	59.25%	1,641	40.75%	745	18.50%	4,027
Leelanau	437	66.62%	219	33.38%	218	33.23%	656
Lenawee	6,205	57.31%	4,623	42.69%	1,582	14.61%	10,828
Livingston	2,238	48.16%	2,409	51.84%	-171	-3.68%	4,647
Mackinac	43	26.54%	119	73.46%	-76	-46.91%	162
Macomb	2,791	51.13%	2,668	48.87%	123	2.25%	5,459
Manistee	656	69.94%	282	30.06%	374	39.87%	938
Manitou	51	30.36%	117	69.64%	-66	-39.29%	168
Marquette	805	52.86%	718	47.14%	87	5.71%	1,523
Mason	401	62.46%	241	37.54%	160	24.92%	642
Mecosta	775	68.77%	352	31.23%	423	37.53%	1,127
Menominee	126	65.63%	66	34.38%	60	31.25%	192
Midland	406	65.17%	217	34.83%	189	30.34%	623
Monroe	2,529	46.46%	2,914	53.54%	-385	-7.07%	5,443
Montcalm	1,520	64.60%	833	35.40%	687	29.20%	2,353
Muskegon	1,433	64.75%	780	35.25%	653	29.51%	2,213
Newaygo	917	69.79%	397	30.21%	520	39.57%	1,314
Oakland	4,738	51.61%	4,442	48.39%	296	3.22%	9,180
Oceana	1,080	72.73%	405	27.27%	675	45.45%	1,485
Ontonagon	227	42.99%	301	57.01%	-74	-14.02%	528
Ottawa	2,441	56.87%	1,851	43.13%	590	13.75%	4,292
Saginaw	3,360	54.88%	2,761	45.09%	599	9.78%	6,123 (Note: Includes 2 Scattering votes)
Sanilac	1,308	70.06%	559	29.94%	749	40.12%	1,867
Shiawassee	2,406	57.44%	1,783	42.56%	623	14.87%	4,189
St. Clair	3,060	53.07%	2,706	46.93%	354	6.14%	5,766
St. Joseph	3,562	58.86%	2,490	41.14%	1,072	17.71%	6,052
Tuscola	1,623	72.04%	630	27.96%	993	44.07%	2,253
Van Buren	3,662	61.88%	2,256	38.12%	1,406	23.76%	5,918
Washtenaw	4,463	49.82%	4,496	50.18%	-33	-0.37%	8,959
Wayne	9,207	47.26%	10,274	52.74%	-1,067	-5.48%	19,481
Total	113,229	57.89%	82,364	42.11%	30,865	15.78%	195,595

==== Counties that flipped from Democratic to Republican ====
- Bay
- Ingham
- Macomb
- Marquette
- Oakland
- Ottawa
- Saginaw
- St. Clair

== See also ==
- United States presidential elections in Michigan
