= 1864 United States presidential election in Michigan =

- November 8, 1864

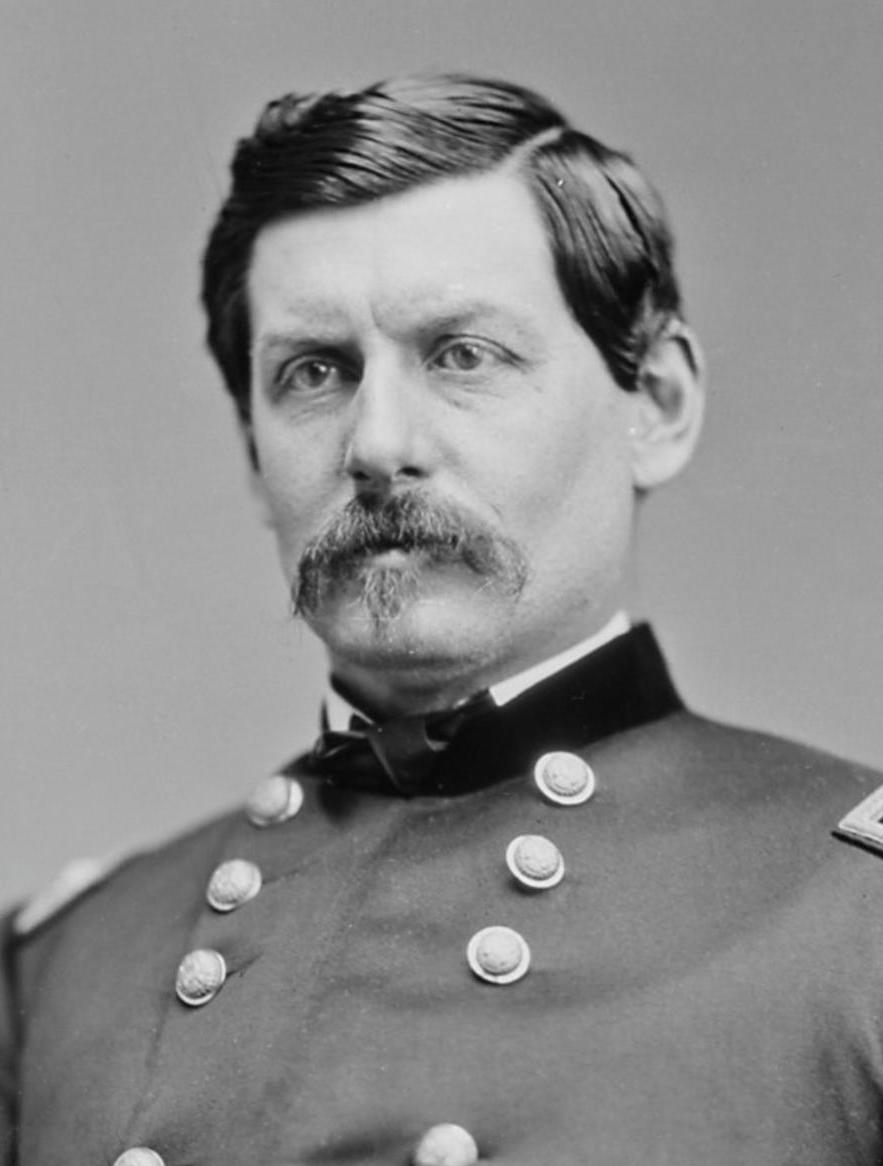
| Nominee | Abraham Lincoln | George B. McClellan |
| Party | National Union | Democratic |
| Home state | Illinois | New Jersey |
| Running mate | Andrew Johnson | George H. Pendleton |
| Electoral vote | 8 | 0 |
| Popular vote | 85,352 | 67,370 |
| Percentage | 55.89% | 44.11% |
County results
Lincoln
50–60%
60–70%
70–80%
80–90%
McClellan
50–60%
60–70%
70–80%
80–90%
90–100%
President before election
Abraham Lincoln
Republican
Elected President
Abraham Lincoln
National Union

The 1864 United States presidential election in Michigan took place on November 8, 1864, as part of the 1864 United States presidential election. Voters chose eight representatives, or electors, to the Electoral College, who voted for president and vice president.

Michigan was won by National Union candidate, incumbent Republican president Abraham Lincoln and his running mate Andrew Johnson. They defeated the Democratic challenger George B. McClellan and his running mate George H. Pendleton. Lincoln won the state by a margin of 7.2%.

As of the 2024 presidential election, this is the last time Ottawa County voted for a Democratic presidential candidate.

== Results ==
General Election Results
| Party | Pledged to | Elector | Votes |
|---|---|---|---|
| National Union Party | Abraham Lincoln | Robert R. Beecher | 85,352 |
| National Union Party | Abraham Lincoln | Frederick Waldorf | 85,352 |
| National Union Party | Abraham Lincoln | Omar D. Conger | 85,348 |
| National Union Party | Abraham Lincoln | Christian Eberbach | 85,348 |
| National Union Party | Abraham Lincoln | Perry Hannah | 85,348 |
| National Union Party | Abraham Lincoln | Thomas D. Gilbert | 85,347 |
| National Union Party | Abraham Lincoln | Marsh Giddings | 85,345 |
| National Union Party | Abraham Lincoln | George W. Peck | 85,332 |
| Democratic Party | George B. McClellan | Samuel T. Douglass | 67,370 |
| Democratic Party | George B. McClellan | Henry Hart | 67,369 |
| Democratic Party | George B. McClellan | D. Darwin Hughes | 67,369 |
| Democratic Party | George B. McClellan | John Lewis | 67,369 |
| Democratic Party | George B. McClellan | Rix Robinson | 67,367 |
| Democratic Party | George B. McClellan | Michael E. Crofoot | 67,352 |
| Democratic Party | George B. McClellan | Royal T. Twombly | 67,329 |
| Democratic Party | George B. McClellan | Richard Edwards | 67,325 |
| Write-in | | Scattering | 1 (Note: There were six Scattering votes cast in Calhoun County, but they appear to have all been cast as a single alternate ticket.) |
| Votes cast (Note: Based on highest elector on each ticket) | | | 152,723 |

=== Results By County ===
| County | Abraham Lincoln National Union | | George B. McClellan Democratic | | Margin | | Total votes cast |
| County | # | % | # | % | # | % | Total votes cast |
|---|---|---|---|---|---|---|---|
| Allegan | 1,861 | 54.67% | 1,543 | 45.33% | 318 | 9.34% | 3,404 |
| Antrim (Note: Not included in official canvass) | 71 | 79.78% | 18 | 20.22% | 53 | 59.55% | 89 |
| Barry | 1,652 | 61.78% | 1,022 | 38.22% | 630 | 23.56% | 2,674 |
| Bay | 462 | 44.17% | 584 | 55.83% | -122 | -11.66% | 1,046 |
| Berrien | 2,554 | 52.54% | 2,307 | 47.46% | 247 | 5.08% | 4,861 |
| Branch | 3,035 | 67.44% | 1,465 | 32.56% | 1,570 | 34.89% | 4,500 |
| Calhoun | 3,742 | 59.74% | 2,521 | 40.25% | 1,221 | 19.49% | 6,264 (Note: Includes 1 Scattering vote) |
| Cass | 1,765 | 55.16% | 1,435 | 44.84% | 330 | 10.31% | 3,200 |
| Cheboygan | 23 | 26.44% | 64 | 73.56% | -41 | -47.13% | 87 |
| Chippewa | 46 | 27.06% | 124 | 72.94% | -78 | -45.88% | 170 |
| Clinton | 1,524 | 51.93% | 1,411 | 48.07% | 113 | 3.85% | 2,935 |
| Delta | 24 | 43.64% | 31 | 56.36% | -7 | -12.73% | 55 |
| Eaton | 1,848 | 57.44% | 1,369 | 42.56% | 479 | 14.89% | 3,217 |
| Emmet | 75 | 34.72% | 141 | 65.28% | -66 | -30.56% | 216 |
| Genesee | 2,743 | 57.80% | 2,003 | 42.20% | 740 | 15.59% | 4,746 |
| Grand Traverse | 375 | 81.70% | 83 | 18.08% | 292 | 63.62% | 459 |
| Gratiot | 571 | 60.94% | 366 | 39.06% | 205 | 21.88% | 937 |
| Hillsdale | 3,805 | 68.81% | 1,725 | 31.19% | 2,080 | 37.61% | 5,530 |
| Houghton | 380 | 27.98% | 978 | 72.02% | -598 | -44.04% | 1,358 |
| Huron | 360 | 51.65% | 337 | 48.35% | 23 | 3.30% | 697 |
| Ingham | 1,792 | 49.99% | 1,793 | 50.01% | -1 | -0.03% | 3,585 |
| Ionia | 2,205 | 61.45% | 1,383 | 38.55% | 822 | 22.91% | 3,588 |
| Iosco | 57 | 57.00% | 43 | 43.00% | 14 | 14.00% | 100 |
| Isabella | 215 | 72.15% | 83 | 27.85% | 132 | 44.30% | 298 |
| Jackson | 3,002 | 50.79% | 2,909 | 49.21% | 93 | 1.57% | 5,911 |
| Kalamazoo | 3,151 | 60.00% | 2,101 | 40.00% | 1,050 | 19.99% | 5,252 |
| Kent | 3,398 | 53.39% | 2,966 | 46.61% | 432 | 6.79% | 6,364 |
| Keweenaw | 295 | 43.00% | 391 | 57.00% | -96 | -13.99% | 686 |
| Lapeer | 1,464 | 54.00% | 1,247 | 46.00% | 217 | 8.00% | 2,711 |
| Leelanau | 235 | 61.68% | 146 | 38.32% | 89 | 23.36% | 381 |
| Lenawee | 4,780 | 56.82% | 3,632 | 43.18% | 1,148 | 13.65% | 8,412 |
| Livingston | 1,604 | 44.72% | 1,983 | 55.28% | -379 | -10.57% | 3,587 |
| Mackinac | 30 | 13.95% | 185 | 86.05% | -155 | -72.09% | 215 |
| Macomb | 2,041 | 48.39% | 2,177 | 51.61% | -136 | -3.22% | 4,218 |
| Manistee | 145 | 67.44% | 70 | 32.56% | 75 | 34.88% | 215 |
| Manitou | 11 | 7.53% | 135 | 92.47% | -124 | -84.93% | 146 |
| Marquette | 178 | 26.97% | 482 | 73.03% | -304 | -46.06% | 660 |
| Mason | 143 | 61.90% | 88 | 38.10% | 55 | 23.81% | 231 |
| Mecosta | 143 | 59.58% | 97 | 40.42% | 46 | 19.17% | 240 |
| Menominee | 58 | 71.60% | 23 | 28.40% | 35 | 43.21% | 81 |
| Midland | 208 | 67.31% | 101 | 32.69% | 107 | 34.63% | 309 |
| Monroe | 1,659 | 41.58% | 2,331 | 58.42% | -672 | -16.84% | 3,990 |
| Montcalm | 595 | 57.32% | 443 | 42.68% | 152 | 14.64% | 1,038 |
| Muskegon | 654 | 64.12% | 366 | 35.88% | 288 | 28.24% | 1,020 |
| Newaygo | 406 | 62.65% | 242 | 37.35% | 164 | 25.31% | 648 |
| Oakland | 3,709 | 49.29% | 3,816 | 50.71% | -107 | -1.42% | 7,525 |
| Oceana | 356 | 66.79% | 177 | 33.21% | 179 | 33.58% | 533 |
| Ontonagon | 252 | 35.69% | 454 | 64.31% | -202 | -28.61% | 706 |
| Ottawa | 1,345 | 46.69% | 1,536 | 53.31% | -191 | -6.63% | 2,881 |
| Saginaw | 1,731 | 47.67% | 1,900 | 52.33% | -169 | -4.65% | 3,631 |
| Sanilac | 753 | 70.31% | 318 | 29.69% | 435 | 40.62% | 1,071 |
| Shiawassee | 1,412 | 52.39% | 1,283 | 47.61% | 129 | 4.79% | 2,695 |
| St. Clair | 1,808 | 46.71% | 2,063 | 53.29% | -255 | -6.59% | 3,871 |
| St. Joseph | 2,681 | 59.88% | 1,796 | 40.12% | 885 | 19.77% | 4,477 |
| Tuscola | 798 | 66.56% | 401 | 33.44% | 397 | 33.11% | 1,199 |
| Van Buren | 1,985 | 58.64% | 1,400 | 41.36% | 585 | 17.28% | 3,385 |
| Washtenaw | 3,632 | 48.63% | 3,836 | 51.37% | -204 | -2.73% | 7,468 |
| Wayne | 5,946 | 43.67% | 7,670 | 56.33% | -1,724 | -12.66% | 13,616 |
| Soldiers | 9,402 | 76.06% | 2,959 | 23.94% | 6,443 | 52.12% | 12,361 |
| Total | 85,352 | 55.89% | 67,370 | 44.11% | 17,982 | 11.77% | 152,723 |

==== Counties that flipped from Democratic to National Union ====
- Iosco
- Isabella

==== Counties that flipped from Republican to Democratic ====
- Ingham
- Livingston
- Macomb
- Monroe
- Oakland
- Ontonagon
- Ottawa
- Saginaw
- St. Clair
- Washtenaw
- Wayne

== See also ==
- United States presidential elections in Michigan
