= 1860 United States presidential election in Michigan =

- November 6, 1860
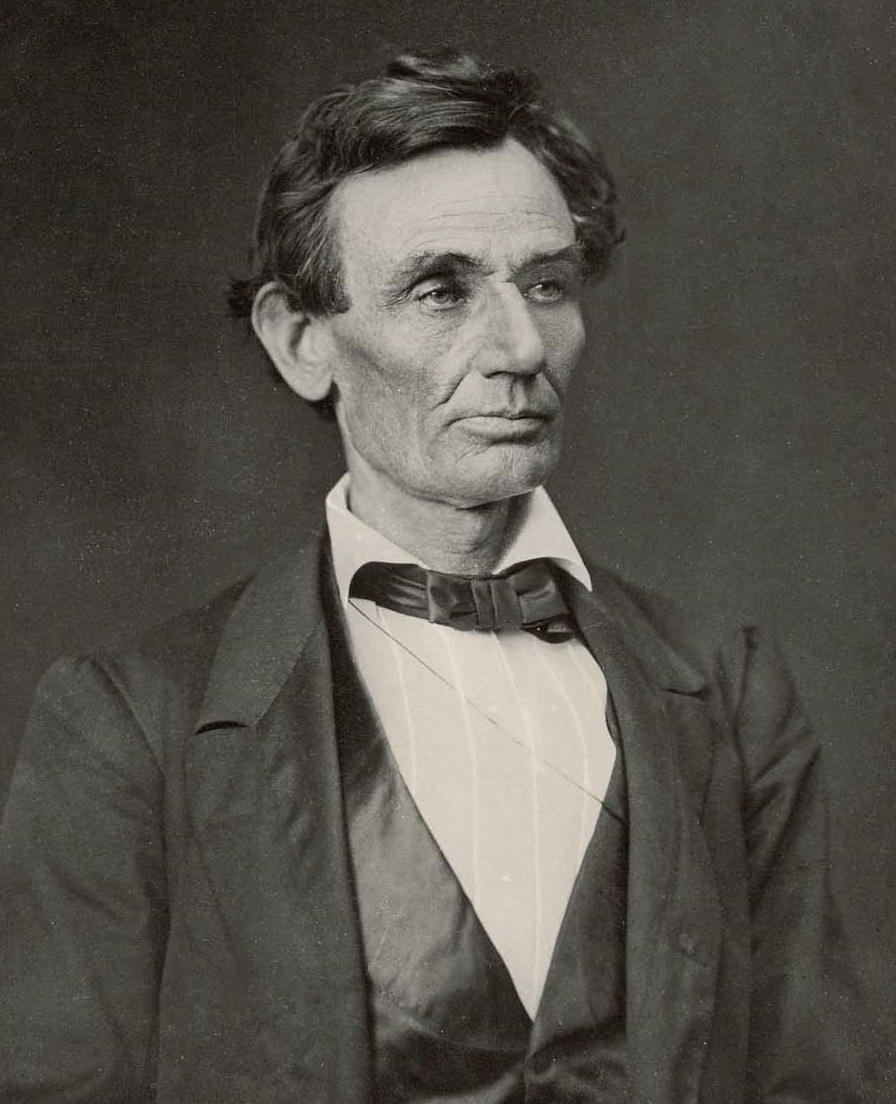

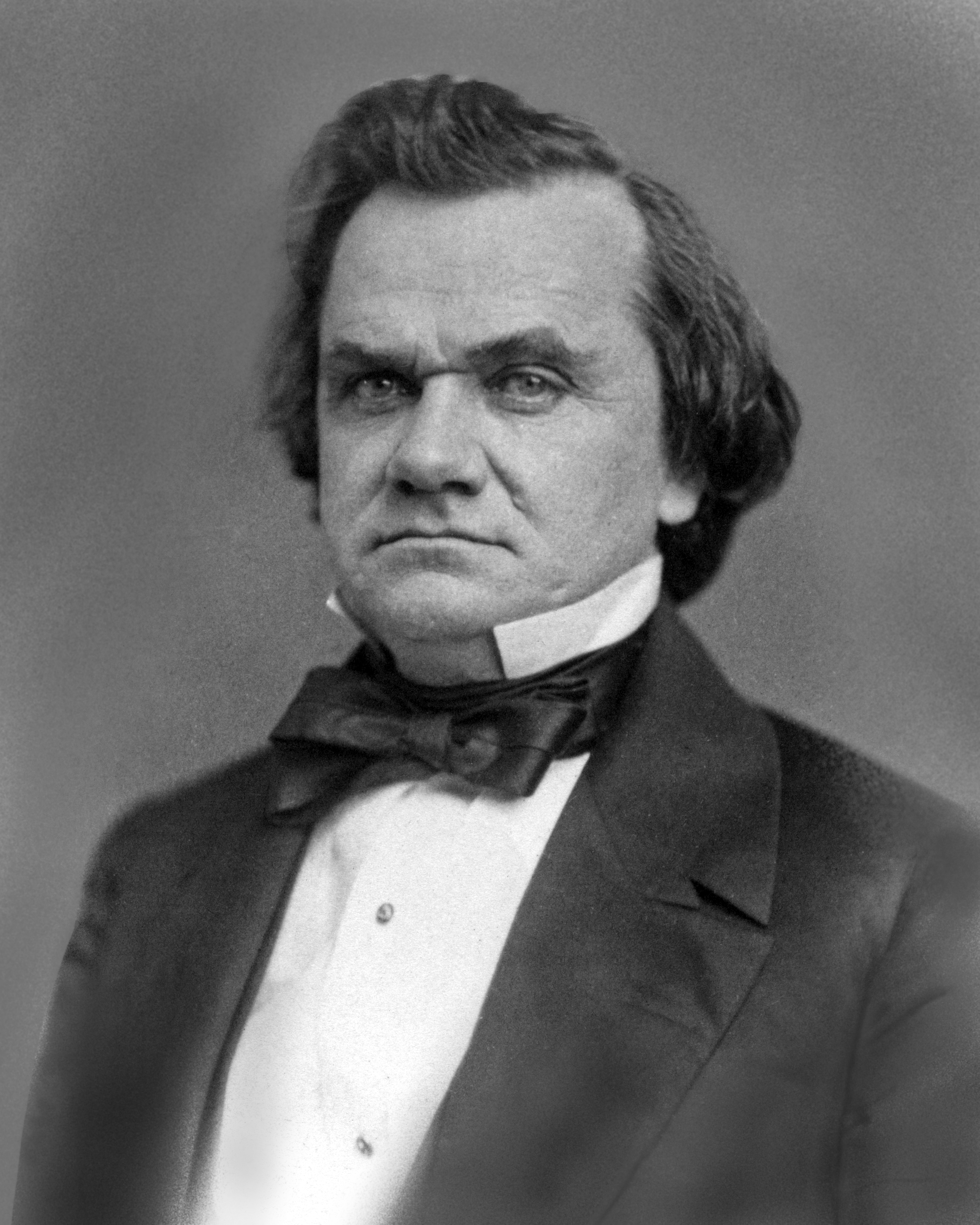
Nominee	Abraham Lincoln	Stephen A. Douglas
Party	Republican	Democratic
Home state	Illinois	Illinois
Running mate	Hannibal Hamlin	Herschel V. Johnson
Electoral vote	6	0
Popular vote	88,480	65,057
Percentage	57.12%	42.00%
County results
Lincoln
50–60%
60–70%
70–80%
Douglas
50–60%
60–70%
70–80%
President before election
James Buchanan
Democratic
Elected President
Abraham Lincoln
Republican

The 1860 United States presidential election in Michigan took place on November 6, 1860, as part of the 1860 United States presidential election. Voters chose six representatives, or electors, to the Electoral College, who voted for president and vice president.

Michigan was won by the Republican nominee, Illinois Representative Abraham Lincoln and his running mate Senator Hannibal Hamlin of Maine. They defeated the Democratic nominee, Senator Stephen A. Douglas of Illinois and his running mate with 41st Governor of Georgia Herschel V. Johnson. Lincoln won the state by a margin of 15.12%.

== Results ==
General Election Results
Party	Pledged to	Elector	Votes
Republican Party	Abraham Lincoln	Rufus Hosmer	88,480
Republican Party	Abraham Lincoln	Hezekiah G. Wells	88,479
Republican Party	Abraham Lincoln	August Coburn	88,478
Republican Party	Abraham Lincoln	Philotus Hayden	88,473
Republican Party	Abraham Lincoln	George W. Lee	88,473
Republican Party	Abraham Lincoln	Edward Dorsch	88,313
Democratic Party	Stephen A. Douglas	Augustus Widenman	65,057
Democratic Party	Stephen A. Douglas	Charles E. Stuart	65,055
Democratic Party	Stephen A. Douglas	Peter G. Hodenpyl	65,049
Democratic Party	Stephen A. Douglas	Stephen G. Clark	65,046
Democratic Party	Stephen A. Douglas	George W. Peck	65,042
Democratic Party	Stephen A. Douglas	Andrew S. Robertson	64,503
Southern Democratic	John C. Breckinridge	Jacob Beeson	805
Southern Democratic	John C. Breckinridge	Barnabas Case	805
Southern Democratic	John C. Breckinridge	Robert P. Eldridge	805
Southern Democratic	John C. Breckinridge	Peter Morey	805
Southern Democratic	John C. Breckinridge	Ralph Madhams	804
Southern Democratic	John C. Breckinridge	William V. Morrison	801
Constitutional Union	John Bell	John Cooper	405
Constitutional Union	John Bell	George R. Warner	405
Constitutional Union	John Bell	Charles E. Niles	404
Constitutional Union	John Bell	John R. Jones	400
Constitutional Union	John Bell	Henry P. Bridge	399
Constitutional Union	John Bell	Henry H. Treadway	389
Write-in		Scattering	157
Votes cast (Note: Based on highest elector on each ticket)			154,904

=== Results by county ===
County	Abraham Lincoln Republican		Stephen A. Douglas Democratic		John C. Breckinridge Southern Democratic		John Bell Constitutional Union		Margin		Total votes cast
County	#	%	#	%	#	%	#	%	#	%	Total votes cast
Allegan	1,896	54.92%	1,544	44.73%	11	0.32%	1	0.03%	352	10.20%	3,452
Alpena	82	74.55%	28	25.45%	0	0.00%	0	0.00%	54	49.09%	110
Barry	1,901	64.18%	1,038	35.04%	23	0.78%	0	0.00%	863	29.14%	2,962
Bay	311	48.82%	324	50.86%	0	0.00%	2	0.31%	-13	-2.04%	637
Berrien	2,620	51.99%	2,337	46.38%	52	1.03%	24	0.48%	283	5.62%	5,039 (Note: Includes 6 Scattering votes)
Branch	3,074	65.91%	1,558	33.40%	19	0.41%	1	0.02%	1,516	32.50%	4,664 (Note: Includes 12 Scattering votes)
Calhoun	4,072	61.66%	2,449	37.08%	45	0.68%	38	0.58%	1,623	24.58%	6,604
Cass	2,068	55.44%	1,624	43.54%	34	0.91%	4	0.11%	444	11.90%	3,730
Cheboygan	20	21.28%	74	78.72%	0	0.00%	0	0.00%	-54	-57.45%	94
Chippewa	64	41.83%	89	58.17%	0	0.00%	0	0.00%	-25	-16.34%	153
Clinton	1,569	55.21%	1,273	44.79%	0	0.00%	0	0.00%	296	10.42%	2,842
Eaton	2,135	61.44%	1,328	38.22%	6	0.17%	0	0.00%	807	23.22%	3,475
Emmet	30	15.15%	168	84.85%	0	0.00%	0	0.00%	-138	-69.70%	198
Genesee	2,832	58.95%	1,920	39.97%	0	0.00%	22	0.46%	912	18.98%	4,804 (Note: Includes 30 Scattering votes)
Grand Traverse	407	67.27%	198	32.73%	0	0.00%	0	0.00%	209	34.55%	605
Gratiot	496	60.41%	314	38.25%	0	0.00%	0	0.00%	182	22.17%	821 (Note: Includes 11 Scattering votes)
Hillsdale	3,749	68.00%	1,719	31.18%	25	0.45%	12	0.22%	2,030	36.82%	5,513 (Note: Includes 8 Scattering votes)
Huron	299	58.86%	209	41.14%	0	0.00%	0	0.00%	90	17.72%	508
Ingham	2,181	54.23%	1,838	45.70%	3	0.07%	0	0.00%	343	8.53%	4,022
Ionia	2,231	63.13%	1,294	36.62%	6	0.17%	3	0.08%	937	26.51%	3,534
Iosco	20	32.79%	41	67.21%	0	0.00%	0	0.00%	21	34.43%	61
Isabella	123	48.43%	131	51.57%	0	0.00%	0	0.00%	8	3.15%	254
Jackson	3,396	56.22%	2,596	42.97%	46	0.76%	3	0.05%	800	13.24%	6,041
Kalamazoo	3,230	60.91%	2,031	38.30%	4	0.08%	38	0.72%	1,199	22.61%	5,303
Kent	3,647	58.06%	2,540	40.44%	87	1.39%	7	0.11%	1,107	17.62%	6,281
Lapeer	1,762	58.79%	1,222	40.77%	8	0.27%	5	0.17%	540	18.02%	2,997
Lenawee	5,080	58.59%	3,510	40.48%	57	0.66%	23	0.27%	1,570	18.11%	8,670
Livingston	2,075	50.83%	2,003	49.07%	4	0.10%	0	0.00%	72	1.76%	4,082
Mackinac	41	31.54%	89	68.46%	0	0.00%	0	0.00%	-48	-36.92%	130
Macomb	2,533	53.28%	2,166	45.56%	15	0.32%	15	0.32%	367	7.72%	4,754 (Note: Includes 25 Scattering votes)
Manistee	126	68.48%	58	31.52%	0	0.00%	0	0.00%	68	36.96%	184
Manitou	56	45.53%	67	54.47%	0	0.00%	0	0.00%	-11	-8.94%	123
Mason	89	64.49%	49	35.51%	0	0.00%	0	0.00%	40	28.99%	138
Mecosta	109	66.46%	55	33.54%	0	0.00%	0	0.00%	54	32.93%	164
Midland	157	78.50%	43	21.50%	0	0.00%	0	0.00%	114	57.00%	200
Monroe	2,282	50.79%	2,165	48.19%	10	0.22%	0	0.00%	117	2.60%	4,493 (Note: Includes 36 Scattering votes)
Montcalm	565	61.02%	361	38.98%	0	0.00%	0	0.00%	204	22.03%	926
Muskegon	502	67.47%	241	32.39%	1	0.13%	0	0.00%	261	35.08%	744
Newaygo	364	63.75%	207	36.25%	0	0.00%	0	0.00%	157	27.50%	571
Oakland	4,411	53.27%	3,768	45.50%	83	1.00%	19	0.23%	643	7.76%	8,281
Oceana	192	54.86%	158	45.14%	0	0.00%	0	0.00%	34	9.71%	350
Ontonagon	331	52.46%	300	47.54%	0	0.00%	0	0.00%	31	4.91%	631
Ottawa	1,414	53.74%	1,217	46.26%	0	0.00%	0	0.00%	197	7.49%	2,631
Saginaw	1,479	54.39%	1,206	44.35%	8	0.29%	8	0.29%	273	10.04%	2,719 (Note: Includes 18 Scattering votes)
Sanilac	899	68.94%	396	30.37%	9	0.69%	0	0.00%	503	38.57%	1,304
Shiawassee	1,606	56.53%	1,221	42.98%	7	0.25%	7	0.25%	385	13.55%	2,841
St. Clair	2,589	56.22%	1,955	42.45%	37	0.80%	19	0.41%	634	13.77%	4,605 (Note: Includes 5 Scattering votes)
St. Joseph	2,832	58.60%	1,980	40.97%	21	0.43%	0	0.00%	852	17.63%	4,833
Tuscola	747	68.09%	350	31.91%	0	0.00%	0	0.00%	397	36.19%	1,097
Van Buren	2,175	62.59%	1,274	36.66%	26	0.75%	0	0.00%	901	25.93%	3,475
Washtenaw	4,286	53.60%	3,630	45.39%	56	0.70%	25	0.31%	656	8.20%	7,997
Wayne	7,325	51.34%	6,701	46.97%	102	0.71%	139	0.97%	624	4.37%	14,267
Total	88,480	57.12%	65,057	42.00%	805	0.52%	405 (Note: The county results add up to 415)	0.26%	23,423	15.12%	154,904

==== Counties that flipped from Democratic to Republican ====
- Grand Traverse
- Saginaw
- Wayne

== See also ==
- United States presidential elections in Michigan
