= Tahquamenon River =

River in Michigan, United States

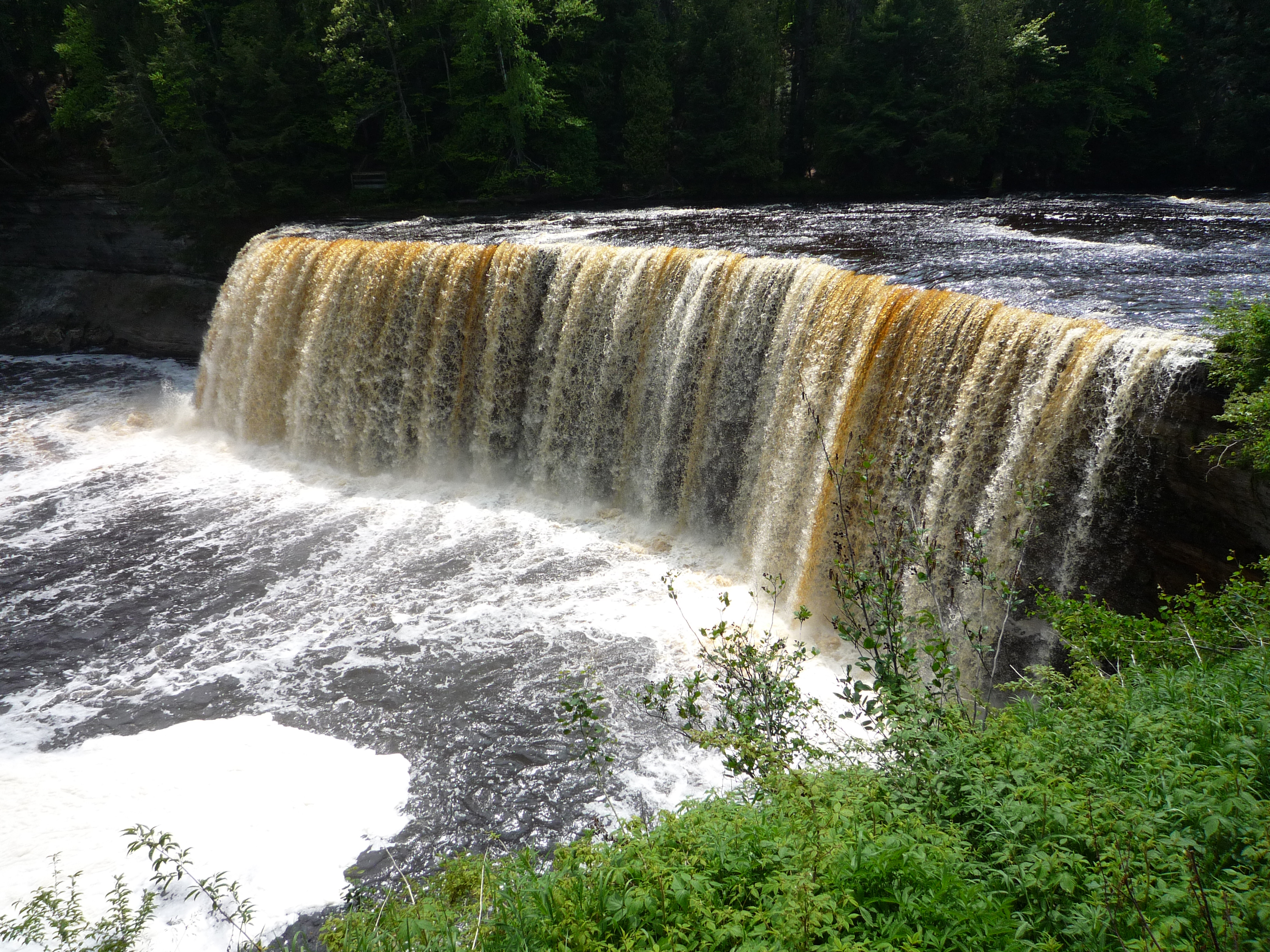
- The Upper Falls on the Tahquamenon River

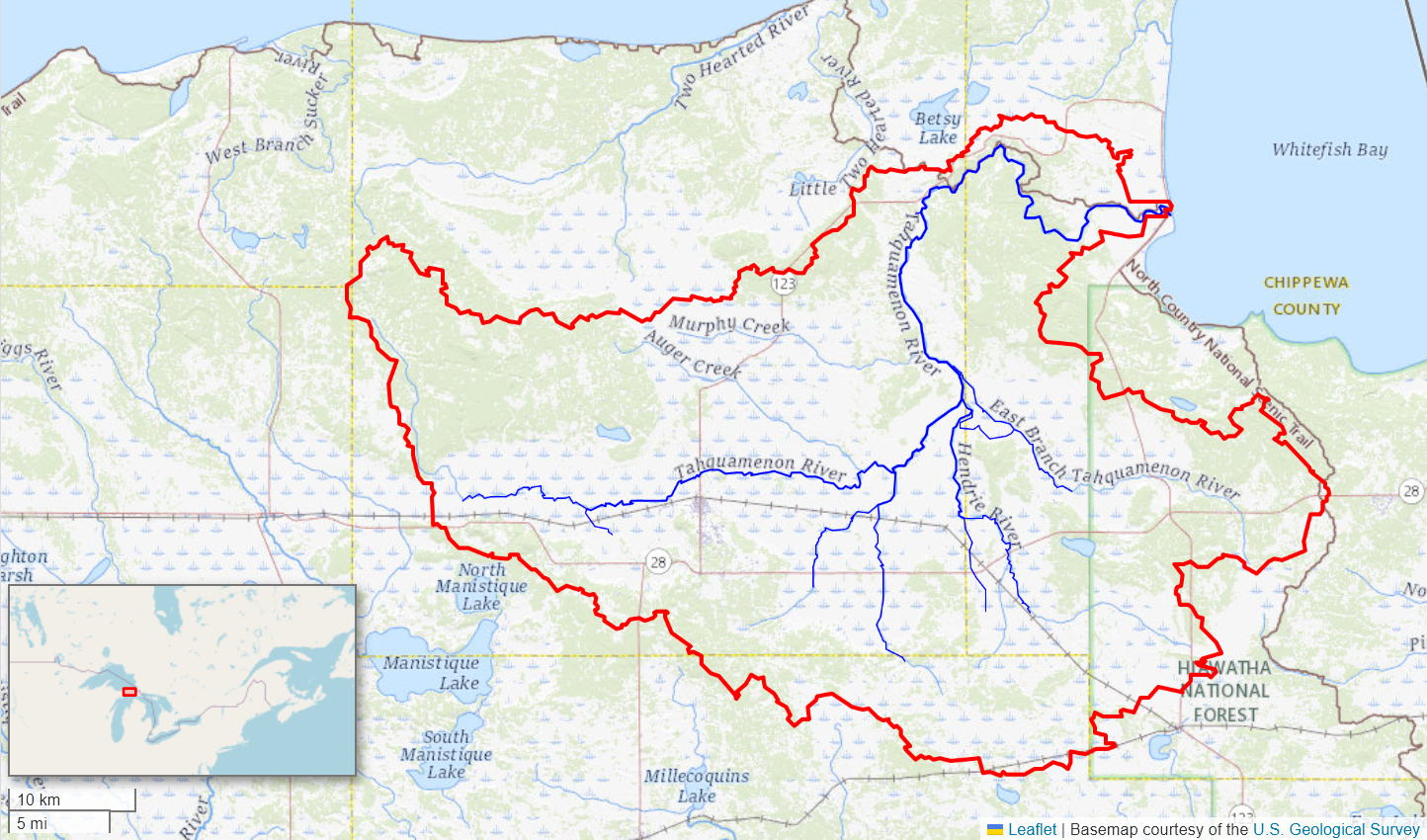
- Map of the Tahquamenon River watershed

Physical characteristics
- Source
  - location: Columbus Township, Luce County, Michigan
  - coordinates: 46.48304°N 85.84514°W
- Mouth
  - location: Emerson, Michigan; Lake Superior
  - coordinates: 46.55502°N 85.02953°W
- Length: 89 mi (143 km)
- Basin size: 820 sq mi (2,100 km^{2})

National Wild and Scenic River
- Official name: Tahquamenon (East Branch)
- Type: Wild, Recreational
- Designated: March 3, 1992

The Tahquamenon River (/təˈkwɑːmənɒn, -nən/ tə-KWAH-mə-non, -nən) is an 89.1-mile-long (143.4 km) blackwater river in the Upper Peninsula of the U.S. state of Michigan. The river flows in a generally eastward direction from the Tahquamenon Lakes of Columbus Township, Luce County to its mouth at Whitefish Bay, a bay of Lake Superior, in Chippewa County. It drains approximately 820 square miles (2,120 km^{2}) of the eastern Upper Peninsula, including large sections of Chippewa and Luce counties, as well as a small portion of Mackinac County. M-123 runs alongside a portion of the river.

Along its course, the river includes the Tahquamenon Falls, a pair of waterfalls that are the largest waterfalls in Michigan, and one of the largest in the eastern half of North America.

== Name ==
The meaning of "Tahquamenon" is not known. Some called it the "River of the Head Winds" because they bucked the wind on the lower river no matter what direction they were paddling. Others called it the "River of a Hundred Bends". Twentieth century descendants of local Chippewa translated the name to mean "river up against a hill" or "lost river island" or "river with an island part way". In 1930 Jesuit scholar, Father William Gagnieut, concluded that the meaning of the name had been lost.

Recorded variously as 'Otikwaminang', 'Outakwamenon', 'Tequamenen', 'Tanguamanon', 'Tanquamanon', 'Toumequellen' and 'Tahquamenaw', several suggestions on the meaning of its name have been made over the years:

- The origin of the present spelling can be traced to a Jesuit map of Lake Superior published in 1672 that named the small island lying 5 miles (8.0 km) off the river mouth as "Outa koua minan'. The early French travelers called the Great Lakes region natives "Outaouaks".
- "Shortcut." The name referring originally to Tahquamenon Bay, which the Ojibwe used as a shortcut while traveling. The bay has a small island in it that facilitated the "shortcut" from Whitefish Point across the open and at times dangerous bay. The name "shortcut" was later given to the River that enters into the bay. However, although 'taqua' (dakwaa) does mean "short", the suffix for "road" or "trail" is -mon in Ojibwe, not 'menon', and although -ing would be a locative suffix, the locative form of -mon is -moong and not -moning. However, in the Algonquin language, the locative form of -mon would be -monaang, closely resembling 'menon'. Additionally, in the Potawatomi language, suffix for "road" or "trail" is -mii, and like in the Algonquin language, the locative form of -mii would be -miinaang, most closely resembling 'menon'.
- "Marsh of the blueberries," though 'menon' (miinan) does mean "blueberries" in the Ojibwa language, 'tahqua' does not mean "marsh"
- "Short cornel" where 'tahqua' (dakwaa) does mean "short" and 'manan' (maanan) does mean "cornel", but cornels do not grow in swamplands
- "Ottawa's good land" (Odaawaag minaang) due to an Ottawa village that used to be located near the mouth of the river
- "Dark-colored water". Although the river's water is dark, the word for "dark-colored water" in Ojibwe is makadewaagamin.

The name for the Tahquamenon River in the Ojibwa language is Adikamegong-ziibi "River where the Whitefish are found." This name is also the naming basis for the Whitefish Point and Whitefish Bay, both known earlier as "Tahquamenaw".

== Tahquamenon Falls ==
The river is best known for the Tahquamenon Falls, a succession of two waterfalls in Tahquamenon Falls State Park totalling approximately 73 feet (22 m) in height. Because the headwaters of the river are located in a boreal wetland that is rich in cedar, spruce and hemlock trees, the river's waters carry a significant amount of tannin in solution (i.e., it is a blackwater river), and are often brown or golden-brown in color. The Tahquamenon Falls are thus acclaimed as being the largest naturally dyed or colored waterfall in the United States. The state park preserves the falls area and some 24 miles (39 km) of the river.

== Recreation ==
In Henry Wadsworth Longfellow's famous poem, The Song of Hiawatha (1855), the hero learned how to paddle a birchbark canoe in the Tahquamenon. The river is often used for canoeing to this day. The river's watershed and state park are also extensively used for fishing and hiking. In winter, the watershed welcomes snowmobilers.

== Tour boat ==
The Toonerville Trolley Train and Riverboat Tour, a private firm, offers 21-mile (34 km) boat tours of the upper Tahquamenon as part of an overall family experience that includes a narrow-gauge rail ride and visit to the Upper Tahquamenon Falls. The tour is based in Soo Junction, between Newberry and Hulbert.
