= Newberry Correctional Facility =

Prison in Michigan, United States

Coordinates: 46°19′48″N 85°30′28″W

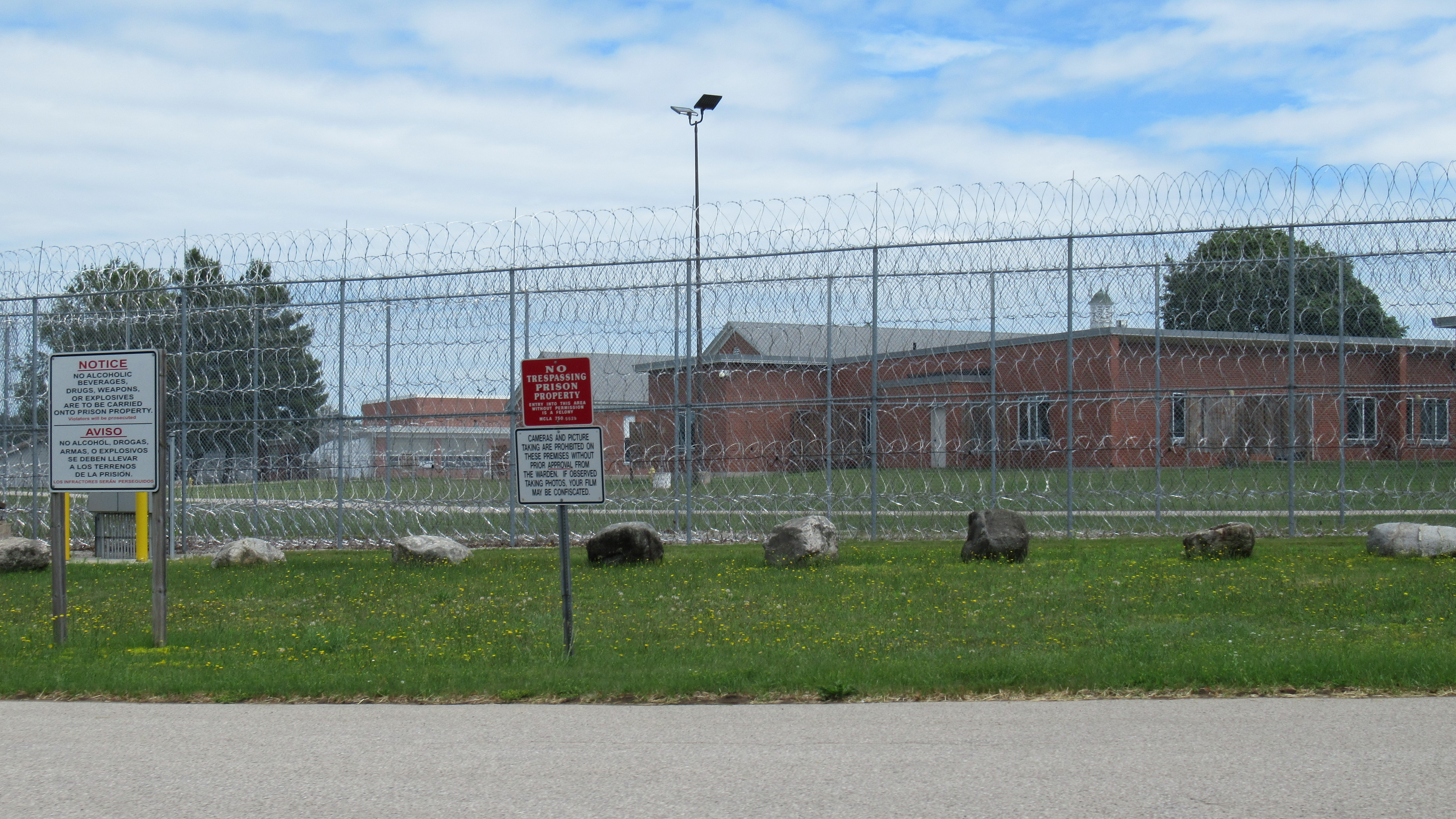
- Interactive map of Newberry Correctional Facility
- Location: 13747 E County Road 428 Newberry, Michigan
- Status: Open
- Security class: Medium
- Capacity: 1108
- Opened: 1996
- Managed by: Michigan Department of Corrections

The Newberry Correctional Facility is a state prison for men, owned and operated by the Michigan Department of Corrections. It is located in the eastern Upper Peninsula of Michigan in Luce County, in the south of Newberry.

The facility was opened in 1996 and has a working capacity of 1108 prisoners, held at a medium security level.
