= Laketon, Michigan =

Laketon may refer to the following places in the U.S. state of Michigan:

- Laketon, Luce County, Michigan, an unincorporated community in Columbus Township
- Laketon Township, Michigan, in Muskegon County, also a former post office
- A former name of the post office for Bridgman, Michigan, in Berrien County
