= John Danaher =

John Danaher may refer to:

- John Danaher (VC) (1860–1919), Irish recipient of the Victoria Cross
- John A. Danaher (1899–1990), U.S. senator and judge from Connecticut
- John A. Danaher III (born 1950), grandson of the above, commissioner of the Connecticut Department of Public Safety
- John Danaher (martial artist) (born 1967), Brazilian jiu-jitsu and mixed martial arts instructor
- John Danaher (ethicist), Irish legal scholar and philosopher
