= Business Operating System =

Business Operating System may refer to:

- Business Operating System (software), a cross-platform operating system originally produced for Intel 8080 and Motorola 6800 computers
- Business Operating System (management), a standard, enterprise-wide collection of business processes used in companies
