= Radiometer (company) =

Danish corporation

- Type: subsidiary
- Industry: Healthcare
- Founded: 1935; 91 years ago
- Founder: Børge Aagaard Nielsen and Carl Schrøder
- Headquarters: Copenhagen, Denmark
- Area served: Worldwide
- Key people: Francis Van Parys (President)
- Products: Medical Devices; Samplers; Data Management Systems
- Number of employees: 3,200 (2016)
- Parent: Danaher
- Website: www.radiometer.com

Radiometer is a Danish multinational company which develops, manufactures and markets solutions for blood sampling, blood gas analysis, transcutaneous monitoring, immunoassay testing and the related IT management systems. The company was founded in 1935 in Copenhagen, Denmark by Børge Aagaard Nielsen and Carl Schrøder. It has over 3,200 employees and direct representation in more than 32 countries. Corporate headquarters remain in Copenhagen.

== History ==
In 1935, engineers, Børge Aagaard Nielsen and Carl Schrøder, founded Radiometer to develop measuring devices for the growing Danish radio industry.

A few years later, Radiometer was contacted by the Carlsberg laboratories and asked to develop an analytical device for the detection of the acid-base (pH) level in liquids. This soon resulted in one of the first commercially available pH meters.

In 1952, as the polio epidemic swept across Europe, many children were at risk of respiratory failure. The head of laboratory, professor Poul Astrup, and anesthesiologist Bjørn Ibsen discovered the right diagnosis by measuring the pH value in blood using Radiometer's pH meters.

This ground-breaking discovery soon formed the basis for Radiometer's entry into medical technology and further innovations within acute care testing.

Today Radiometer's devices are present in 16 of the top 20 hospitals in America as identified in the 2016-2017 U.S. News & World Report Honor Roll of Best Hospitals. Their products are typically used in blood banks, operating rooms, clinics, general practice offices, intensive care units, neonatal intensive care units and pediatric intensive care units.

In 1998 Radiometer acquired Carlsbad, California based SenDx Medical, Inc. SenDx manufactures medical and industrial instruments and blood analysis systems. Later, in 2013, Radiometer acquired Swedish diagnostics company HemoCue AB from Quest Diagnostics. HemoCue develops, produces and markets medical diagnostic products for point-of-care testing like hemoglobin, glucose and others worldwide.

== Products & Offerings ==
The company offers a range of products for:

- Blood Gas Testing
- Neonatal Monitoring
- Immunoassay Testing
- Transcutaneous Monitoring
- Point-of-Care Data Management
- Blood sampling
- Diabetes (via HemoCue)
- Hemoglobin Testing (via HemoCue)
- Quality Control

Its products are covered by over 95 patents and patent applications.

== Parent Company & Acquisition ==
The Danaher Corporation is a US conglomerate headquartered in Washington, D.C. Last year the company landed at #214 on Forbes’ list of largest public companies, boasting 81,000 employees and over $20 billion in revenue.

In July 2016 Danaher completed the spin-off of the Fortive Corporation (NYSE: FTV) which comprised its Test & Measurement segment, Industrial Technologies segment and Retail/Commercial Petroleum business. Notable brands such as Fluke, Qualitrol, Tektronix, Gilbarco Veeder-Root, Kollmorgen and Matco Tools were included in the spin-off.

Radiometer was acquired by Danaher in 2004. The Danaher businesses are concentrated in the fields of design, manufacturing, and marketing of industrial and consumer products. It operates in 4 segments: Diagnostics, Environmental & Applied Solutions, Dental and Life Sciences.

Radiometer is one of 6 companies in the Diagnostics segment. The companies within this segment offer a broad range of analytical instruments, reagents, consumables, software and services used to diagnose diseases and make treatment decisions in histopathology labs, hospitals and other critical care settings.

Diagnostics Segment:

- Beckman Coulter
- Cepheid
- HemoCue
- Leica Biosystems
- Molecular Devices
- Radiometer

Environmental & Applied Solutions:

- ALLTEC/FOBA
- ChemTreat
- Esko
- Hach
- LINX
- McCrometer
- Pantone
- Trojan Technologies
- Videojet
- X-Rite

Dental:

- Implant Direct
- KaVo
- Kerr
- Nobel Biocare
- Ormco

Life Sciences:

- Beckman Coulter Life Sciences
- Leica Microsystems
- Pall
- SCIEX
