= 24-Hour Economy =

24H+ Ghana Government Policy

The 24-Hour Economy and Accelerated Export Development Programme (24H+) is a governmental policy program introduced by the National Democratic Congress (NDC) on how business operations and beyond business operations is being done in Ghana. This policy was essentially introduced to reset how the Ghanaian economy do business internally and externally looking at its exports and imports productions in other to boost the economy and create value for its people.

== Projects ==
- Volta Economic Corridor.
- Legon Pharmaceutical Innovation Park.
- Kumasi Machinery & Technology.
- Ghana Mall.
- Akosombo-Juapong Garment & Textile Park.
- TVET Digital Centre of Excellence.
- Eden Volta: Ghana's New Breadbasket.
- Agbleduwo: Farming Reimaniged.
- Shikpon: Growing Fresh Food where We Live.
