= Pentland Township, Michigan =

- Civil township
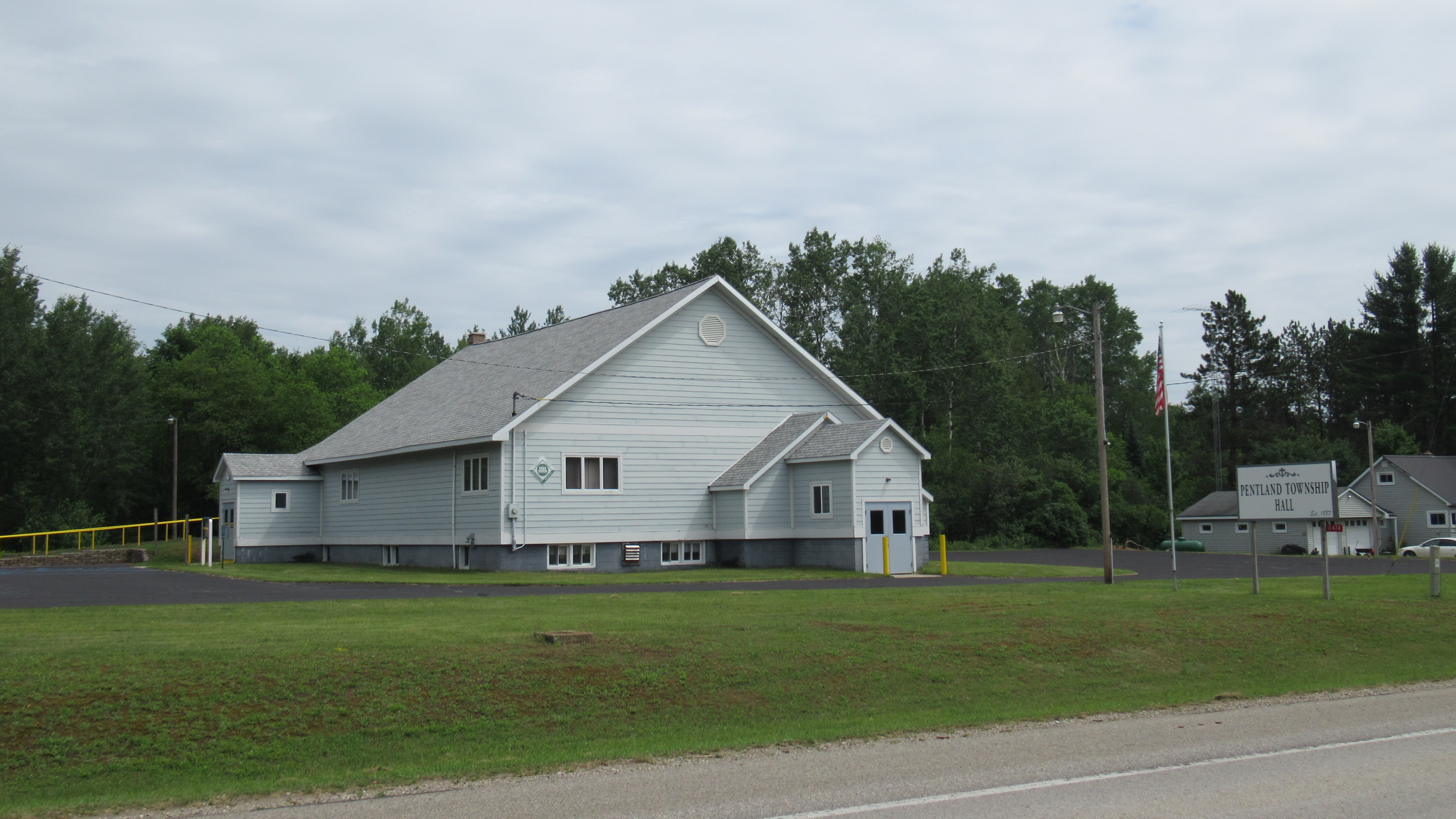
- Pentland Township Hall

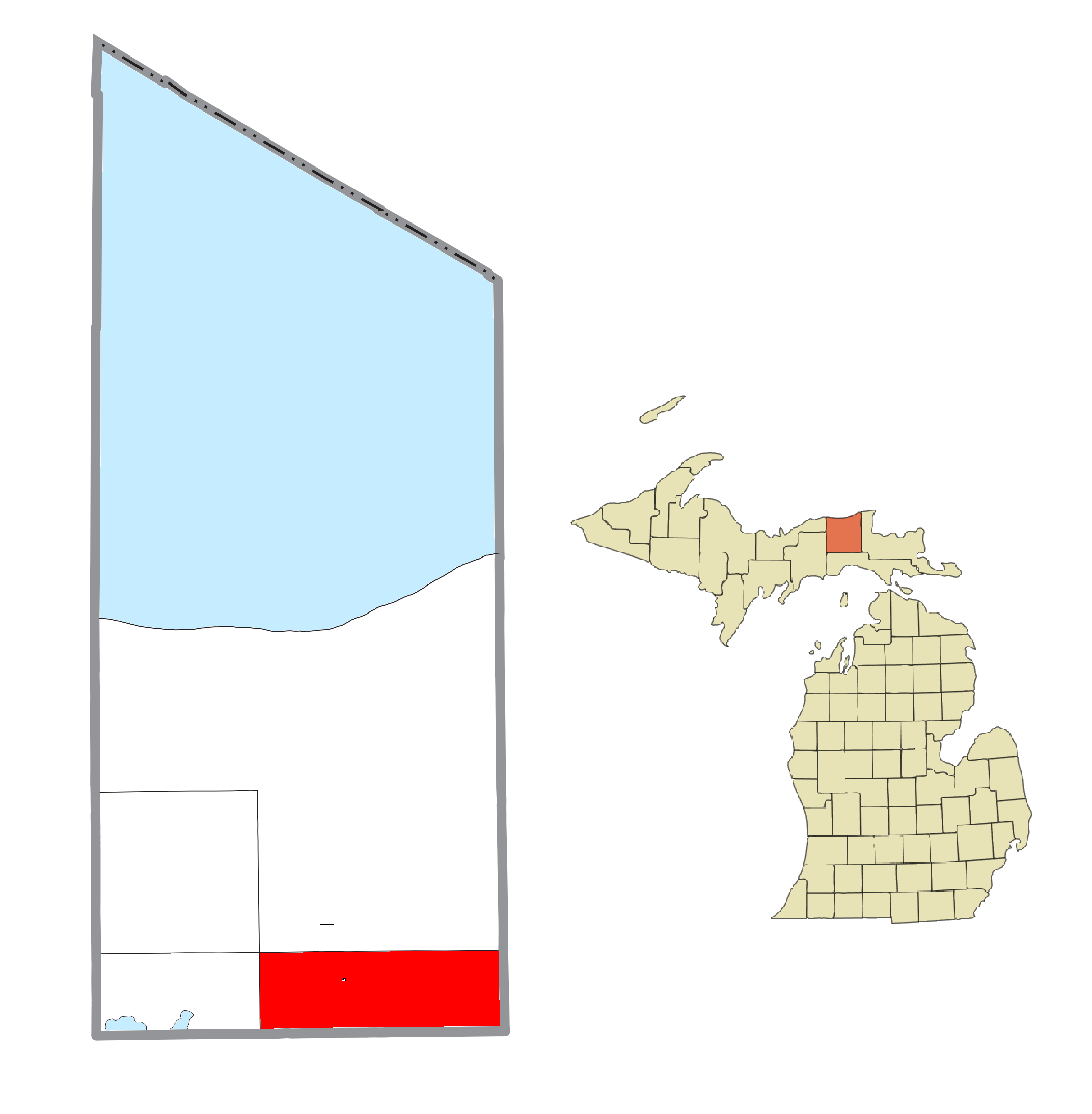
- Location within Luce County

- Location within the state of Michigan Location within the United States
- Coordinates: 46°18′00″N 85°29′16″W
- Country: United States
- State: Michigan
- County: Luce
- Established: 1887

Government
  - Supervisor: Janet Maki
  - Clerk: Greg Rathje

Area
  - Total: 107.34 sq mi (278.0 km^{2})
  - Land: 106.79 sq mi (276.6 km^{2})
  - Water: 0.55 sq mi (1.4 km^{2})
- Elevation: 801 ft (244 m)

Population (2020)
  - Total: 1,564
  - Density: 25/sq mi (9.7/km^{2})
- Time zone: UTC-5 (Eastern (EST))
  - Summer (DST): UTC-4 (EDT)
- ZIP code(s): 49868 (Newberry)
- Area code: 906
- FIPS code: 26-63500
- GNIS feature ID: 1626892
- Website: Official website

Pentland Township is a civil township of Luce County in the U.S. state of Michigan. As of the 2020 census, the township population was 1,564.

== Geography ==
According to the United States Census Bureau, the township has a total area of 107.34 square miles (278.01 km^{2}), of which 106.79 square miles (276.58 km^{2}) is land and 0.55 square miles (1.4 km^{2}) (0.51%) is water.

== Demographics ==
At the census of 2000, there were 1,788 people, 693 households, and 516 families residing in the township. The population density was 16.7 per square mile (6.5/km^{2}). There were 825 housing units at an average density of 7.7 per square mile (3.0/km^{2}). The racial makeup of the township was 88.70% White, 0.17% African American, 7.44% Native American, 0.11% Asian, 0.06% from other races, and 3.52% from two or more races. Hispanic or Latino of any race were 0.39% of the population. In 2020, its population declined to 1,564.

In 2000, there were 693 households, out of which 32.8% had children under the age of 18 living with them, 62.3% were married couples living together, 8.4% had a female householder with no husband present, and 25.5% were non-families. 21.9% of all households were made up of individuals, and 9.7% had someone living alone who was 65 years of age or older. The average household size was 2.55 and the average family size was 2.95. In the township the population was spread out, with 26.4% under the age of 18, 6.5% from 18 to 24, 27.6% from 25 to 44, 24.6% from 45 to 64, and 14.9% who were 65 years of age or older. The median age was 39 years. For every 100 females, there were 100.4 males. For every 100 females age 18 and over, there were 98.8 males.

As of 2000, the median income for a household in the township was $35,990, and the median income for a family was $37,991. Males had a median income of $34,583 versus $22,692 for females. The per capita income for the township was $16,352. About 12.0% of families and 14.0% of the population were below the poverty line, including 20.3% of those under age 18 and 8.6% of those age 65 or over. At the 2021 estimates, its median household income was $60,703.

== Transportation ==
=== Airports ===
- Luce County Airport is located within Pentland Township.

=== Major highways ===
- M-28 runs east–west through the center of the township.
- M-117 runs south–north through the western portion of the township and ends at M-28.
- M-123 runs north–south has its northern terminus within the township at M-28. Because of the highway's angle, it is the "northern" terminus, even though it is running in a south direction.
