= Kery =

Kery may refer to:

== People ==
- Anikó Kéry (born 1956), Hungarian gymnast
- Kery James, French rapper
- Marián Kéry, (born 1978), Slovak politician
- Sabine Schut-Kery (born 1968), American dressage rider
- Theodor Kery (1918–2010), Austrian politician

== Places ==
- Luce County Airport, United States (by ICAO code)

== Other ==
- KERy or Streetcars in Kenosha, Wisconsin
