= Danaher =

Danaher is a surname. Notable people with the surname include:

- Declan Danaher (born 1980), English Rugby union player
- Jody Danaher, Irish rugby player
- John Danaher (ethicist) Irish legal scholar and philosopher specialized in the legal and ethical impacts of AI and emerging technologies
- John Danaher (martial artist) (born 1967), New Zealand Brazilian jiu-jitsu and mixed martial arts instructor
- John Danaher (VC) (1860–1919), Irish recipient of the Victoria Cross
- John A. Danaher (1899–1990), American politician and judge
- John A. Danaher III (born 1950), grandson of the above, commissioner of the Connecticut Department of Public Safety
- Kevin Danaher (Caoimhín Ó Danachair), (1913–2002), Irish author and folklorist
- Kevin Danaher (activist) (born 1950), American author and anti-globalization activist
- Phil Danaher (American football) (born 1948), American football coach
- Phil Danaher (rugby union) (born 1965), Irish rugby player
- Phyllis Danaher (1908–1991), Australian dancer, teacher of dance, and choreographer

== Other uses ==
- Danaher, Michigan, an unincorporated community within Columbus Township, Luce County, Michigan, U.S.
- Danaher Corporation, American global conglomerate founded in 1984
- Danaher Death Squad, an American submission grappling team
- Danaher Sheehan (born 1974), Irish rugby player
