= 1936 United States presidential election in Michigan =

- November 3, 1936

All 19 Michigan votes to the Electoral College

Nominee	Franklin D. Roosevelt	Alf Landon
Party	Democratic	Republican
Home state	New York	Kansas
Running mate	John Nance Garner	Frank Knox
Electoral vote	19	0
Popular vote	1,016,794	699,733
Percentage	56.33%	38.76%
County results
Roosevelt
40–50%
50–60%
60–70%
Landon
40–50%
50–60%
60–70%
President before election
Franklin D. Roosevelt
Democratic
Elected President
Franklin D. Roosevelt
Democratic

The 1936 United States presidential election in Michigan took place on November 3, 1936, as part of the 1936 United States presidential election. Voters chose 19 representatives, or electors, to the Electoral College, who voted for president and vice president.

Michigan was won by Democratic incumbents president Franklin D. Roosevelt and vice president John Nance Garner, defeating Republican candidate Alf Landon and his running mate Frank Knox by 317,061 votes, or a margin of 17.57%.

== Results ==
1936 United States presidential election in Michigan
Party	Candidate	Votes	%
Democratic	Franklin D. Roosevelt (inc.)	1,016,794	56.33%
Republican	Alf Landon	699,733	38.76%
Union	William Lemke	75,795	4.20%
Socialist	Norman Thomas	8,208	0.45%
Communist	Earl Browder	3,384	0.19%
Socialist Labor	John W. Aiken	600	0.03%
Prohibition	D. Leigh Colvin	579	0.03%
Write-in	Scattering	5	0.00%
Total votes		1,805,098	100.00%

=== Results by county ===
County	Franklin D. Roosevelt Democratic		Alf Landon Republican		William Lemke Union		Norman Thomas Socialist		Earl Browder Communist		All Others Various		Margin		Total votes cast
County	#	%	#	%	#	%	#	%	#	%	#	%	#	%	Total votes cast
Alcona	919	38.13%	1,276	52.95%	212	8.80%	3	0.12%	0	0.00%	0	0.00%	-357	-14.81%	2,410
Alger	2,824	67.09%	1,291	30.67%	33	0.78%	12	0.29%	49	1.16%	0	0.00%	1,533	36.42%	4,209
Allegan	5,922	36.77%	9,247	57.41%	881	5.47%	32	0.20%	6	0.04%	18	0.11%	-3,325	-20.64%	16,106
Alpena	3,231	45.66%	3,536	49.97%	283	4.00%	23	0.33%	2	0.03%	1	0.01%	-305	-4.31%	7,076
Antrim	2,032	44.10%	2,391	51.89%	167	3.62%	13	0.28%	2	0.04%	3	0.07%	-359	-7.79%	4,608
Arenac	1,761	50.90%	1,505	43.50%	176	5.09%	9	0.26%	5	0.14%	4	0.12%	256	7.40%	3,460
Baraga	2,218	51.16%	2,035	46.94%	48	1.11%	34	0.78%	0	0.00%	0	0.00%	183	4.22%	4,335
Barry	3,880	41.92%	4,950	53.48%	376	4.06%	33	0.36%	7	0.08%	9	0.10%	-1,070	-11.56%	9,255
Bay	13,789	55.41%	8,729	35.08%	2,292	9.21%	60	0.24%	7	0.03%	8	0.03%	5,060	20.33%	24,885
Benzie	1,686	46.09%	1,742	47.62%	203	5.55%	21	0.57%	3	0.08%	3	0.08%	-56	-1.53%	3,658
Berrien	20,822	56.09%	15,321	41.27%	874	2.35%	92	0.25%	11	0.03%	5	0.01%	5,501	14.82%	37,125
Branch	5,425	47.69%	5,528	48.60%	383	3.37%	22	0.19%	8	0.07%	9	0.08%	-103	-0.91%	11,375
Calhoun	20,231	55.96%	14,667	40.57%	1,047	2.90%	166	0.46%	25	0.07%	17	0.05%	5,564	15.39%	36,153
Cass	5,114	49.43%	4,525	43.74%	683	6.60%	16	0.15%	3	0.03%	4	0.04%	589	5.69%	10,345
Charlevoix	2,669	46.64%	2,814	49.18%	168	2.94%	65	1.14%	1	0.02%	5	0.09%	-145	-2.53%	5,722
Cheboygan	3,016	50.19%	2,584	43.00%	379	6.31%	25	0.42%	1	0.02%	4	0.07%	432	7.19%	6,009
Chippewa	5,259	50.58%	4,901	47.13%	186	1.79%	22	0.21%	26	0.25%	4	0.04%	358	3.44%	10,398
Clare	1,494	40.29%	1,979	53.37%	217	5.85%	16	0.43%	1	0.03%	1	0.03%	-485	-13.08%	3,708
Clinton	4,296	43.73%	4,915	50.04%	570	5.80%	36	0.37%	1	0.01%	5	0.05%	-619	-6.30%	9,823
Crawford	876	58.67%	580	38.85%	25	1.67%	12	0.80%	0	0.00%	0	0.00%	296	19.83%	1,493
Delta	8,954	64.93%	4,527	32.83%	192	1.39%	82	0.59%	32	0.23%	4	0.03%	4,427	32.10%	13,791
Dickinson	7,952	61.48%	4,563	35.28%	330	2.55%	60	0.46%	24	0.19%	5	0.04%	3,389	26.20%	12,934
Eaton	6,780	48.32%	6,649	47.39%	522	3.72%	69	0.49%	3	0.02%	8	0.06%	131	0.93%	14,031
Emmet	3,075	47.39%	2,893	44.58%	495	7.63%	24	0.37%	1	0.02%	1	0.02%	182	2.80%	6,489
Genesee	49,891	67.48%	21,097	28.54%	2,578	3.49%	273	0.37%	75	0.10%	17	0.02%	28,794	38.95%	73,931
Gladwin	1,533	45.86%	1,645	49.21%	158	4.73%	6	0.18%	1	0.03%	0	0.00%	-112	-3.35%	3,343
Gogebic	8,461	63.82%	4,649	35.07%	16	0.12%	50	0.38%	79	0.60%	2	0.02%	3,812	28.75%	13,257
Grand Traverse	3,827	47.96%	3,676	46.07%	453	5.68%	18	0.23%	2	0.03%	4	0.05%	151	1.89%	7,980
Gratiot	5,457	48.30%	5,322	47.11%	432	3.82%	39	0.35%	1	0.01%	47	0.42%	135	1.19%	11,298
Hillsdale	5,023	41.11%	6,723	55.03%	429	3.51%	30	0.25%	3	0.02%	9	0.07%	-1,700	-13.92%	12,217
Houghton	11,642	54.90%	9,345	44.07%	129	0.61%	23	0.11%	66	0.31%	1	0.00%	2,297	10.83%	21,206
Huron	3,949	35.24%	5,240	46.76%	1,966	17.54%	43	0.38%	4	0.04%	5	0.04%	-1,291	-11.52%	11,207
Ingham	27,086	56.06%	19,434	40.23%	1,579	3.27%	167	0.35%	25	0.05%	22	0.05%	7,652	15.84%	48,313
Ionia	7,140	48.30%	6,487	43.88%	1,113	7.53%	34	0.23%	2	0.01%	6	0.04%	653	4.42%	14,782
Iosco	1,547	44.52%	1,768	50.88%	143	4.12%	12	0.35%	4	0.12%	1	0.03%	-221	-6.36%	3,475
Iron	5,216	57.13%	3,834	41.99%	16	0.18%	17	0.19%	43	0.47%	4	0.04%	1,382	15.14%	9,130
Isabella	3,871	44.71%	4,051	46.79%	695	8.03%	26	0.30%	7	0.08%	8	0.09%	-180	-2.08%	8,658
Jackson	19,288	52.86%	16,350	44.81%	687	1.88%	98	0.27%	40	0.11%	23	0.06%	2,938	8.05%	36,486
Kalamazoo	17,870	47.81%	17,824	47.68%	1,396	3.73%	151	0.40%	36	0.10%	103	0.28%	46	0.12%	37,380
Kalkaska	952	50.91%	855	45.72%	45	2.41%	17	0.91%	1	0.05%	0	0.00%	97	5.19%	1,870
Kent	44,823	52.55%	36,633	42.94%	3,232	3.79%	449	0.53%	121	0.14%	46	0.05%	8,190	9.60%	85,304
Keweenaw	1,060	49.21%	1,070	49.68%	2	0.09%	9	0.42%	12	0.56%	1	0.05%	-10	-0.46%	2,154
Lake	1,337	53.63%	1,091	43.76%	51	2.05%	9	0.36%	2	0.08%	3	0.12%	246	9.87%	2,493
Lapeer	3,868	41.31%	5,081	54.26%	372	3.97%	26	0.28%	1	0.01%	16	0.17%	-1,213	-12.95%	9,364
Leelanau	1,542	45.29%	1,692	49.69%	158	4.64%	9	0.26%	3	0.09%	1	0.03%	-150	-4.41%	3,405
Lenawee	8,299	38.72%	12,154	56.70%	893	4.17%	73	0.34%	4	0.02%	12	0.06%	-3,855	-17.98%	21,435
Livingston	4,117	43.05%	5,117	53.51%	311	3.25%	18	0.19%	0	0.00%	0	0.00%	-1,000	-10.46%	9,563
Luce	1,297	51.57%	1,199	47.67%	4	0.16%	7	0.28%	6	0.24%	2	0.08%	98	3.90%	2,515
Mackinac	2,286	52.60%	1,984	45.65%	62	1.43%	10	0.23%	4	0.09%	0	0.00%	302	6.95%	4,346
Macomb	17,593	60.05%	9,383	32.02%	2,168	7.40%	93	0.32%	50	0.17%	12	0.04%	8,210	28.02%	29,299
Manistee	4,542	54.40%	3,509	42.02%	256	3.07%	34	0.41%	8	0.10%	1	0.01%	1,033	12.37%	8,350
Marquette	11,994	60.44%	7,607	38.33%	138	0.70%	41	0.21%	59	0.30%	5	0.03%	4,387	22.11%	19,844
Mason	4,598	56.14%	3,224	39.37%	319	3.89%	28	0.34%	16	0.20%	5	0.06%	1,374	16.78%	8,190
Mecosta	2,621	41.33%	3,176	50.09%	516	8.14%	17	0.27%	8	0.13%	3	0.05%	-555	-8.75%	6,341
Menominee	6,447	61.13%	3,556	33.72%	483	4.58%	45	0.43%	10	0.09%	5	0.05%	2,891	27.41%	10,546
Midland	3,751	47.14%	3,829	48.12%	334	4.20%	32	0.40%	6	0.08%	5	0.06%	-78	-0.98%	7,957
Missaukee	1,385	43.79%	1,730	54.69%	40	1.26%	5	0.16%	2	0.06%	1	0.03%	-345	-10.91%	3,163
Monroe	11,075	52.03%	8,330	39.14%	1,817	8.54%	31	0.15%	6	0.03%	25	0.12%	2,745	12.90%	21,284
Montcalm	4,950	45.31%	5,031	46.05%	851	7.79%	64	0.59%	1	0.01%	28	0.26%	-81	-0.74%	10,925
Montmorency	958	53.28%	792	44.05%	37	2.06%	11	0.61%	0	0.00%	0	0.00%	166	9.23%	1,798
Muskegon	17,252	63.58%	9,366	34.52%	328	1.21%	123	0.45%	51	0.19%	13	0.05%	7,886	29.06%	27,133
Newaygo	3,288	43.01%	3,930	51.41%	372	4.87%	46	0.60%	5	0.07%	3	0.04%	-642	-8.40%	7,644
Oakland	40,329	54.50%	30,071	40.64%	3,139	4.24%	316	0.43%	97	0.13%	45	0.06%	10,258	13.86%	73,997
Oceana	2,902	49.51%	2,663	45.44%	264	4.50%	24	0.41%	5	0.09%	3	0.05%	239	4.08%	5,861
Ogemaw	1,774	49.21%	1,631	45.24%	179	4.97%	19	0.53%	2	0.06%	0	0.00%	143	3.97%	3,605
Ontonagon	3,233	58.12%	2,162	38.86%	37	0.67%	15	0.27%	114	2.05%	2	0.04%	1,071	19.25%	5,563
Osceola	1,992	36.09%	3,107	56.29%	398	7.21%	17	0.31%	3	0.05%	3	0.05%	-1,115	-20.20%	5,520
Oscoda	492	51.46%	456	47.70%	7	0.73%	1	0.10%	0	0.00%	0	0.00%	36	3.77%	956
Otsego	1,280	52.31%	1,102	45.03%	56	2.29%	6	0.25%	3	0.12%	0	0.00%	178	7.27%	2,447
Ottawa	9,579	44.26%	11,114	51.35%	849	3.92%	85	0.39%	10	0.05%	8	0.04%	-1,535	-7.09%	21,645
Presque Isle	2,905	63.08%	1,621	35.20%	65	1.41%	11	0.24%	2	0.04%	1	0.02%	1,284	27.88%	4,605
Roscommon	782	46.44%	836	49.64%	51	3.03%	13	0.77%	2	0.12%	0	0.00%	-54	-3.21%	1,684
Saginaw	22,592	54.56%	15,527	37.50%	3,059	7.39%	195	0.47%	15	0.04%	22	0.05%	7,065	17.06%	41,410
Sanilac	3,285	29.77%	6,975	63.20%	749	6.79%	20	0.18%	1	0.01%	6	0.05%	-3,690	-33.44%	11,036
Schoolcraft	2,333	60.05%	1,430	36.81%	97	2.50%	19	0.49%	2	0.05%	4	0.10%	903	23.24%	3,885
Shiawassee	6,666	48.03%	6,017	43.36%	1,072	7.72%	46	0.33%	8	0.06%	69	0.50%	649	4.68%	13,878
St. Clair	12,663	45.58%	12,760	45.93%	2,280	8.21%	71	0.26%	2	0.01%	6	0.02%	-97	-0.35%	27,782
St. Joseph	6,048	43.80%	7,160	51.85%	560	4.06%	30	0.22%	1	0.01%	10	0.07%	-1,112	-8.05%	13,809
Tuscola	3,743	33.91%	6,188	56.07%	1,079	9.78%	22	0.20%	1	0.01%	4	0.04%	-2,445	-22.15%	11,037
Van Buren	6,720	40.35%	9,110	54.70%	729	4.38%	57	0.34%	31	0.19%	8	0.05%	-2,390	-14.35%	16,655
Washtenaw	13,589	46.05%	14,986	50.78%	727	2.46%	166	0.56%	33	0.11%	9	0.03%	-1,397	-4.73%	29,510
Wayne	404,055	64.53%	190,732	30.46%	24,928	3.98%	3,958	0.63%	2,052	0.33%	395	0.06%	213,323	34.07%	626,120
Wexford	3,771	53.05%	3,153	44.35%	149	2.10%	20	0.28%	3	0.04%	13	0.18%	618	8.69%	7,109
Totals	1,016,794	56.33%	699,733	38.76%	75,795	4.20%	8,242	0.46%	3,369	0.19%	1,165	0.06%	317,061	17.56%	1,805,098

==== Counties that flipped from Democratic to Republican ====
- Alcona
- Alpena
- Branch
- Clare
- Clinton
- Gladwin
- Huron
- Isabella
- Leelanau
- Livingston
- Montcalm
- Roscommon
- St. Joseph
- Van Buren

==== Counties that flipped from Republican to Democratic ====
- Chippewa
- Houghton
- Iron
- Kalamazoo
- Kalkaska
- Kent
- Luce
- Marquette
- Oscoda
- Schoolcraft
- Wexford

== See also ==
- United States presidential elections in Michigan
