= Ian Fishback =

American army officer (1979–2021)

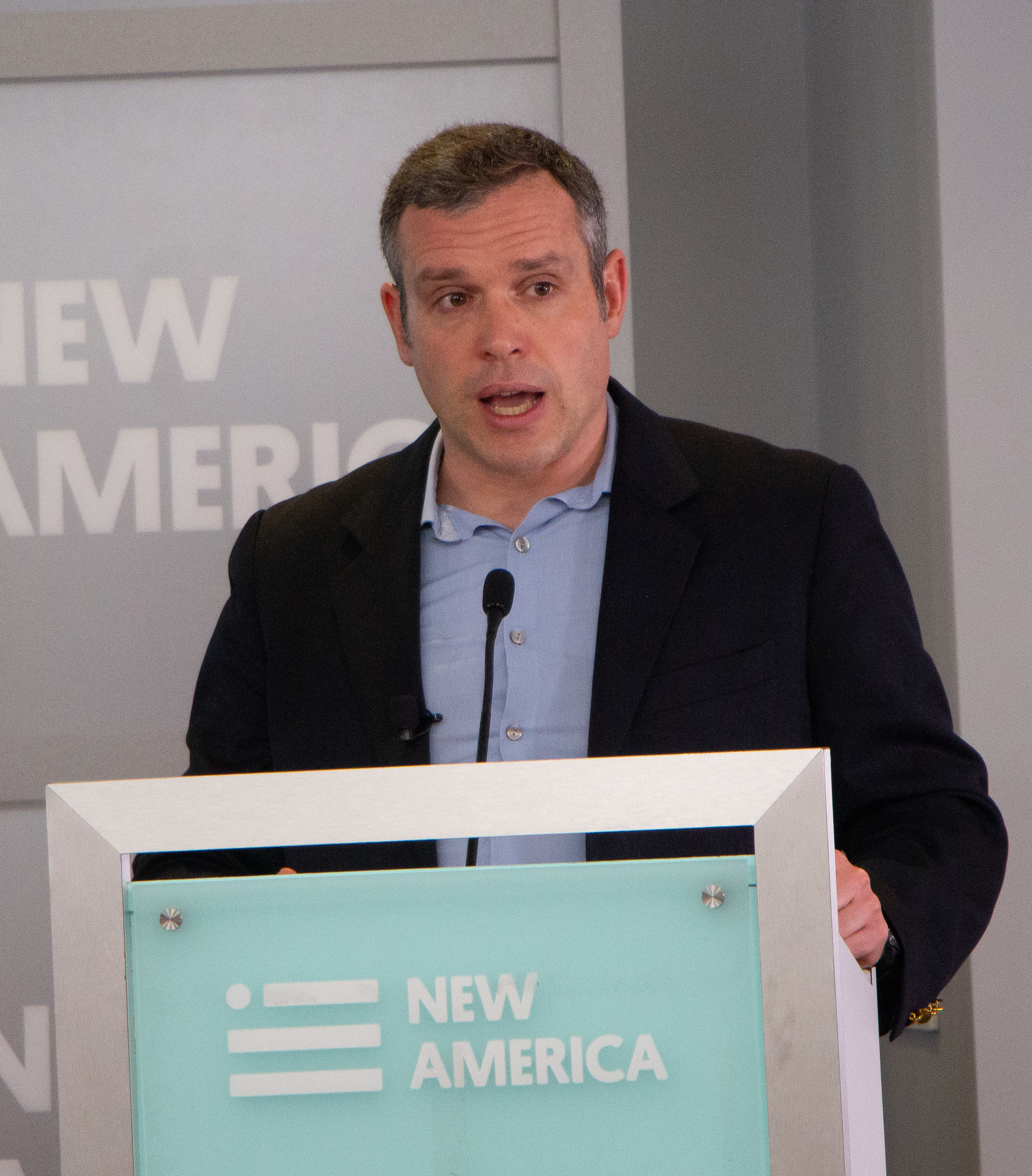
- Ian Fishback, December 2019
- Born: January 19, 1979; Detroit, Michigan
- Died: November 19, 2021 (aged 42); Bangor, Michigan
- Military career
- Allegiance: United States
- Branch: United States Army Special Forces
- Rank: Major
- Awards: Bronze Star (2)
- Other work: Academic

Ian Fishback (January 19, 1979 – November 19, 2021) was a United States Army officer, who became known after he sent a letter to Senator John McCain of Arizona on September 16, 2005, in which Fishback stated his concerns about the continued abuse of prisoners held under the auspices of the Global War on Terror.

After receipt of his letter, McCain, along with Republican Senators John Warner and Lindsey Graham, wrote an amendment to a Senate bill that would make illegal previous Bush administration claims for the use of extreme methods of abuse.

== Early life ==
Fishback was born in Detroit on January 19, 1979. He was a 1997 graduate of Newberry High School in Newberry, Michigan, where he played on a football team.

He was admitted to West Point and earned a bachelor of science degree in middle eastern studies in 2001. In May 2012, Fishback was awarded a master's degree in philosophy and political science at the University of Michigan, writing his master thesis on just war theory. He received a Ph.D. in philosophy from the University of Michigan in 2021.

== Military service ==
Fishback served in the United States Army and achieved the rank of major in the United States Army Special Forces. He served four combat tours in the U.S. Army, two with the 82nd Airborne and two with the Fifth Special Forces Group. Fishback retired from the Army in 2014.

=== Reporting Detainee Abuse ===
While stationed in Iraq, for more than a year Fishback expressed concerns to his immediate chain of command regarding treatment of detainees at Forward Operating Base Mercury in Fallujah District but was ignored. In 2005 Fishback decided to write a letter to McCain about what he perceived as a military culture that was permissive toward the abuse of prisoners.

Dear Senator McCain:

While I served in the Global War on Terror, the actions and statements of my leadership led me to believe that United States policy did not require application of the Geneva Conventions in Afghanistan or Iraq. On 7 May 2004, Secretary of Defense Rumsfeld's testimony that the United States followed the Geneva Conventions in Iraq and the "spirit" of the Geneva Conventions in Afghanistan prompted me to begin an approach for clarification. For 17 months, I tried to determine what specific standards governed the treatment of detainees by consulting my chain of command through battalion commander, multiple JAG lawyers, multiple Democrat and Republican Congressmen and their aides, the Ft. Bragg Inspector General's office, multiple government reports, the Secretary of the Army and multiple general officers, a professional interrogator at Guantanamo Bay, the deputy head of the department at West Point responsible for teaching Just War Theory and Law of Land Warfare, and numerous peers who I regard as honorable and intelligent men.

Instead of resolving my concerns, the approach for clarification process leaves me deeply troubled. Despite my efforts, I have been unable to get clear, consistent answers from my leadership about what constitutes lawful and humane treatment of detainees. I am certain that this confusion contributed to a wide range of abuses including death threats, beatings, broken bones, murder, exposure to elements, extreme forced physical exertion, hostage-taking, stripping, sleep deprivation and degrading treatment. I and troops under my command witnessed some of these abuses in both Afghanistan and Iraq.

This is a tragedy. I can remember, as a cadet at West Point, resolving to ensure that my men would never commit a dishonorable act; that I would protect them from that type of burden. It absolutely breaks my heart that I have failed some of them in this regard.

That is in the past and there is nothing we can do about it now. But, we can learn from our mistakes and ensure that this does not happen again. Take a major step in that direction; eliminate the confusion. My approach for clarification provides clear evidence that confusion over standards was a major contributor to the prisoner abuse. We owe our soldiers better than this. Give them a clear standard that is in accordance with the bedrock principles of our nation.

Some do not see the need for this work. Some argue that since our actions are not as horrifying as Al Qaeda's, we should not be concerned. When did Al Qaeda become any type of standard by which we measure the morality of the United States? We are America, and our actions should be held to a higher standard, the ideals expressed in documents such as the Declaration of Independence and the Constitution.

Others argue that clear standards will limit the President's ability to wage the War on Terror. Since clear standards only limit interrogation techniques, it is reasonable for me to assume that supporters of this argument desire to use coercion to acquire information from detainees. This is morally inconsistent with the Constitution and justice in war. It is unacceptable.

Both of these arguments stem from the larger question, the most important question that this generation will answer. Do we sacrifice our ideals in order to preserve security? Terrorism inspires fear and suppresses ideals like freedom and individual rights. Overcoming the fear posed by terrorist threats is a tremendous test of our courage. Will we confront danger and adversity in order to preserve our ideals, or will our courage and commitment to individual rights wither at the prospect of sacrifice? My response is simple. If we abandon our ideals in the face of adversity and aggression, then those ideals were never really in our possession. I would rather die fighting than give up even the smallest part of the idea that is "America."

Once again, I strongly urge you to do justice to your men and women in uniform. Give them clear standards of conduct that reflect the ideals they risk their lives for.

With the Utmost Respect,—Capt. Ian Fishback
1st Battalion,
504th Parachute Infantry Regiment,
82nd Airborne Division,
Fort Bragg, North Carolina

The letter resulted in the creation of an anti-torture legislation, the Detainee Treatment Act, "sponsored by Senator McCain and passed by the Senate in an overwhelming show of bipartisan support with a vote of 90-9."

During debates over his amendment, Senator McCain said:

I thank God every day that we have men and women the caliber of Captain Fishback serving in our military. I believe the Congress has a responsibility to answer this call.

On May 8, 2006, Fishback was chosen by Time magazine as one of the 100 most influential people in the world for taking his stand against torture.

Matthew Harwood, an associate editor at Security Management magazine, wrote in Attitudes Aren't Free: Thinking Deeply About Diversity in the US Armed Forces (2012) that Fishback's letter to Senator McCain "is a testament that inside the US military lies redemption".

== Teaching and research ==
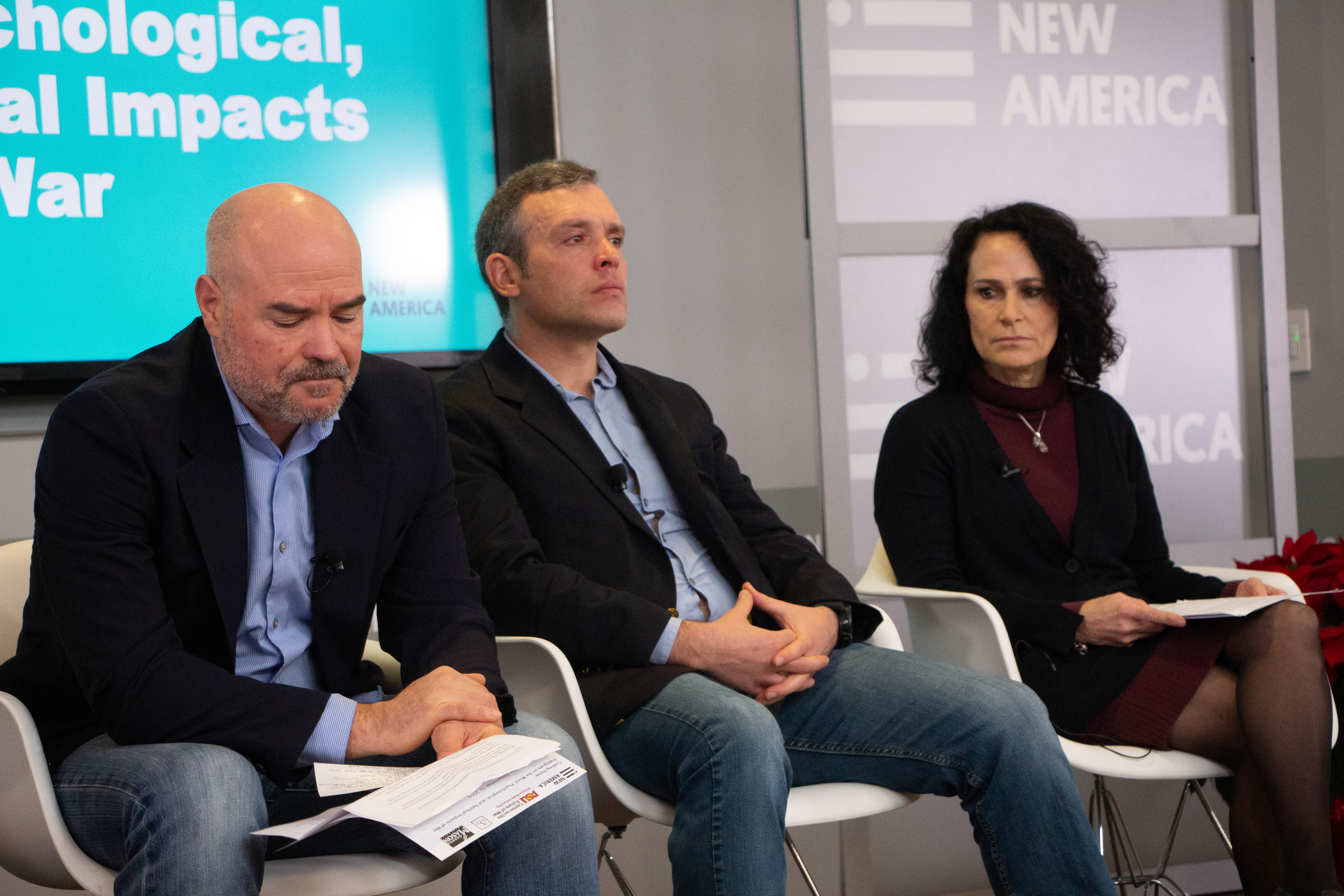
Ian Fishback (center) among a panel discussing the moral, psychological, and spiritual effects of war with Lt. Col. Bill Edmonds and Dr. Kate McGraw, New America Foundation, December 2019

From 2012 to 2015, Fishback served as an instructor at West Point, where he built good rapport with cadets. He collaborated with Jeff McMahan to create a joint philosophy seminar for West Point cadets and Rutgers philosophy students in 2013.

He became a Ph.D. student in philosophy at the University of Michigan, Ann Arbor researching the interplay of morality and law regarding relative proportionality and necessity. In 2021, Fishback submitted his Ph.D. dissertation that was entitled, Method and the Morality of War (adviser Elizabeth S. Anderson).

As an interdisciplinary scholar exploring the moral foundations of obedience to orders and command responsibility in unconventional warfare contexts, he presented and participated in discussion panels on the intersection of national security and human rights, obedience to orders and the structure of the morality, appropriate use of military force, and strategic consequences of torture, among other topics.

In 2020, the Fulbright U.S. Scholar Program awarded Fishback the Fulbright-Lund Distinguished Chair of Public International Law grant to lecture and conduct research in Lund, Sweden at the Raoul Wallenberg Institute of Human Rights and Humanitarian Law in January–October 2021. However, his increasing struggle with mental illness prevented him from continuing on with the course in the spring.

== Later life and death ==
He returned to Newberry from Sweden and according to his family struggled with depression. Records from his multiple stays at various mental health facilities indicate only a vague diagnosis of unspecified psychotic disorder. Acquaintances, friends, and family all describe Fishback as experiencing extreme paranoia, suffering from the delusion that the U.S. government was tracking after him for his whistleblower activities. Fishback was shuffled between several different facilities during the last months of his life as the V.A. lacked facilities in Michigan to properly house and care for him. Veterans' Affairs later decided he did not qualify for services because he was neither suicidal nor a danger to others.

Ian Fishback died at a non-V.A. care facility in Bangor, Michigan, on November 19, 2021, aged 42. Despite being in excellent physical shape prior to admission in the facility, family members report that within two months, Fishback's health declined substantially. Per his medical records, he was kept heavily medicated and received no psychiatric treatment otherwise save for a single assessment before a transfer to an adult foster care facility, Cornerstone, ten days before his death. According to case management records, staff at Cornerstone continued to over-medicate him, to the point where social workers noted that Fishback could not move or reposition himself without help.

Following Fishback's death, Veterans' Affairs conducted an autopsy which stated his death as "sudden cardiac death in schizophrenia" despite the heart showing no visible or genetic abnormalities. The report did raise the possibility that the medications Fishback was being treated with could have caused his death, but nothing was settled. External and internal investigations conducted following the autopsy revealed that the V.A. had attempted to suppress documents showing Fishback's attempts to receive treatment from their facilities and deflect blame onto Fishback himself. They also attempted to shift blame onto the state facilities, though Cornerstone and Pathways both released statements arguing that they were not equipped to deal with a complex case where PTSD and traumatic brain injury related to military service could have been involved in Fishback's rapid mental health decline.

His memorial service with around 100 people in attendance was held at American Legion Post #74 in Newberry, Michigan. Andrew Bacevich stated that Major Fishback was a "uniformed whistleblower who took seriously the values of “duty, honor, and country” he had learned at West Point. A classic straight arrow, Ian found intolerable even the slightest deviation from what the soldierly code of conduct required."

Senator Dick Durbin called Ian Fishback a military hero:

Major Fishback’s courageous letter shed light on the atrocities that were being committed—shamefully—in the name of our nation. ... After reports emerged from horrific abuses at Abu Ghraib in Iraq, I tried for a year and a half to pass legislation to make it clear that cruel, inhuman, and degrading treatment of detainees was illegal. Two military heroes, my former colleague Senator John McCain and Major Fishback, turned the tide in this effort.

== See also ==
- Joe Darby
- Alberto J. Mora
- Philip D. Zelikow
