= Business operating system (management) =

Collection of business processes

The term business operating system (BOS) refers to standard, enterprise-wide collection of business processes used in many diversified industrial companies. The definition has also been extended to include the common structure, principles and practices necessary to drive the organization.

Diversified industrial companies like Ingersoll Rand, Honeywell, and Danaher have adopted a standard, common collection of business processes and/or business process improvement methodologies which they use to manage strategy development and execution. In the case of Danaher, the business system is a core part of the company's culture and is seen as one of the key drivers of corporate performance.

The objectives of such systems are to ensure daily work is focused on the organisation's strategic objectives and is done in the most efficient way. The systems deal with the questions "why" (purpose of the work), "what" (specific objectives of the work) and "how" (the processes used to do the work). The Toyota Production System is focused on both how to make cars, and how to improve the way cars are made. A third objective can also be added, which is to improve the business system itself by identifying or improving the component tools and techniques.

== Terminology ==
Terms used to describe such systems include:

- XPS - meaning “Company-specific Production System" with the X standing in place of the company name
- Business System
- Management Operating System

== Examples of business operating systems ==
- Toyota's Toyota Production System (TPS) is one of the earliest examples, developed between 1948 and 1975
- Danaher is well known for its Danaher Business System (DBS)
- Fortive (a company that split from Danaher in 2016) has the Fortive Business System (FBS) which is derived from the DBS
- Ingersoll Rand established the Ingersoll Rand business operating system (BOS) to describe the six enterprise focus areas and its process improvement method (Lean Six Sigma).
- Honeywell has the Honeywell Operating System (HOS)
- United Technologies had the Achieving Competitive Excellence (ACE) Operating System
- Magellan Operating System (Magellan Aerospace)
- Entrepreneurial Operating System (E.O.S.) is used primarily by SMEs and taught by over 850 professional implementers
- Synozur’s Company Operating System™ is an example of a modern business operating system, combining management frameworks with the Vega software platform to support strategy definition, goal setting, and ongoing execution cadence.
- Business in a Box is an example of a modern cloud-based Business Operating System (BOS) for small and medium-sized businesses. It brings structure, HR management, workflows, frameworks, knowledge, collaboration, and AI into an integrated platform.
- ProSlot BOS is an example of a modern SaaS business that creates Custom Business Operating Systems for small to midsize businesses tailored to their needs.

== List of common features ==
Many of business operating systems share common features. This is because the systems are derived from other known systems, and from established methods and practices for business management. The following is a list of features that appear in several systems.

- Hoshin Kanri, a strategic planning methodology developed by Yoji Akao, used to create goals, assign them measurable milestones, and assess progress against those milestones (Hoshin Kanri is also referred to as Policy Deployment or X-Matrix)
- Standard work - the best and most reliable methods and sequences for each work process which is used as the basis for sustaining improvements
- Process improvement methodologies: Lean, Six Sigma, and Kaizen are popular approaches incorporated in business systems
- Just-in-time manufacturing
- Gemba walks
- Jidoka - "automation with a human touch" where human intervention is used to improve machine performance
- Visual controls or visual management where management processes (e.g. checking) use simple graphics to show problems at a glance
- Problem solving techniques such as root cause analysis
- Technology: While these standard business operating systems may inform or be linked to a company's technology platform, they more commonly refer to the way the company manages complex business processes in a common way across its diverse portfolio of businesses.
