= Columbus Township, Luce County, Michigan =

Columbus Township, Michigan
- Civil township
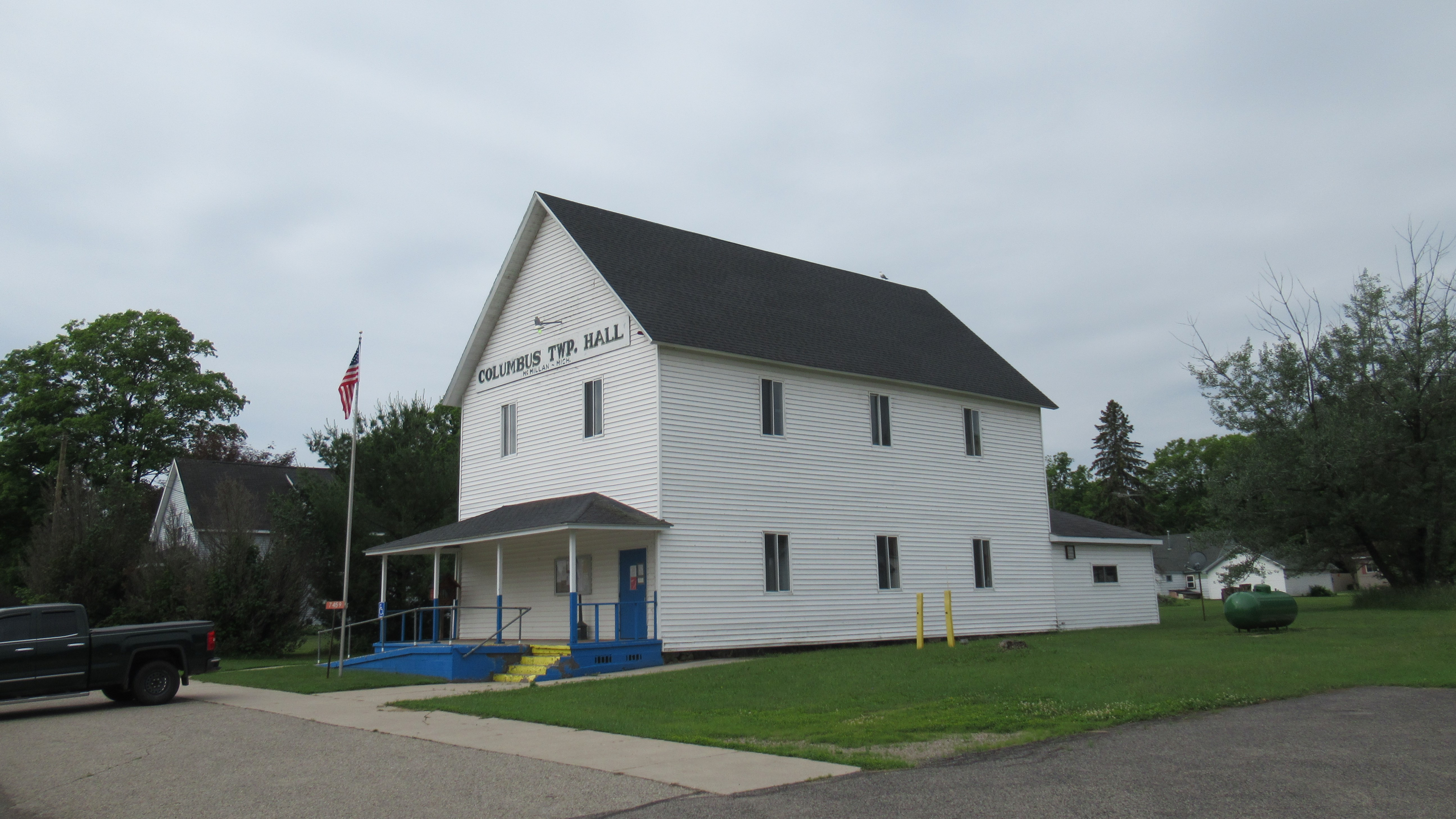
- Columbus Township Hall in McMillan

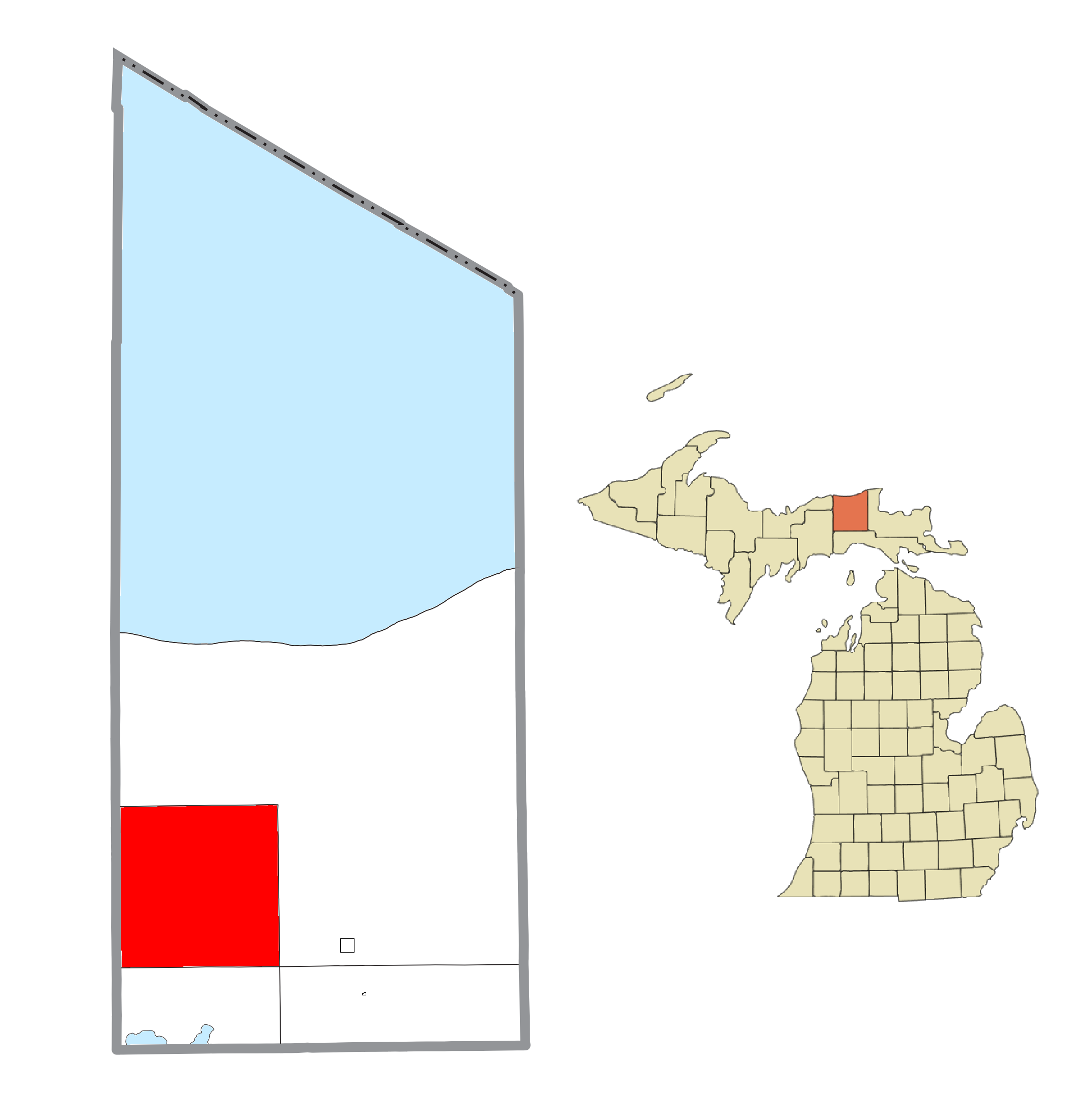
- Location within Luce County

- Location within the state of Michigan Location within the United States
- Coordinates: 46°24′54″N 85°44′52″W
- Country: United States
- State: Michigan
- County: Luce
- Organized: 1887

Government
  - Supervisor: Roger Auble
  - Clerk: Jeff Anderson

Area
  - Total: 143.16 sq mi (370.8 km^{2})
  - Land: 140.34 sq mi (363.5 km^{2})
  - Water: 2.82 sq mi (7.3 km^{2})
- Elevation: 863 ft (263 m)

Population (2020)
  - Total: 169
  - Density: 1.45/sq mi (0.56/km^{2})
- Time zone: UTC-5 (Eastern (EST))
  - Summer (DST): UTC-4 (EDT)
- ZIP code(s): 49853 (McMillan); 49868 (Newberry)
- Area code: 906
- FIPS code: 26-17480
- GNIS feature ID: 1626122

Columbus Township is a civil township of Luce County in the U.S. state of Michigan. As of the 2020 census, the township population was 169.

== Geography ==
According to the United States Census Bureau, the township has a total area of 143.16 square miles (370.78 km^{2}), of which 140.34 square miles (363.48 km^{2}) is land and 2.82 square miles (7.30 km^{2}) (1.97%) is water.

The source of the Tahquamenon River is within Columbus Township.

=== Major highways ===
- M-28 / LSCT runs east–west through a southern portion of the township.

=== Communities ===
- Danaher is an unincorporated community at 46°20′37″N 85°46′51″W just north of M-28 west of Newberry.
- Laketon is an unincorporated community at 46°20′34″N 85°44′54″W, approximately 3 miles (4.8 km) west of McMillan. Laketon was a whistlestop on the Duluth, South Shore and Atlantic Railroad. A post office opened on March 11, 1902, with John M. Carr as its first postmaster. The office closed on May 15, 1913.
- McMillan is an unincorporated community and a census-designated place in Luce County at 46°20′20″N 85°41′14″W. The community was settled along a railway line as early as 1881. McMillan has its own post office with the 49853 ZIP Code. The post office serves most of Columbus Township and small portions of several surrounding townships.

== Demographics ==
At the census of 2000, there were 215 people, 99 households, and 63 families residing in the township. The population density was 1.5 per square mile (0.58/km^{2}). There were 307 housing units at an average density of 2.2 per square mile (0.85/km^{2}). The racial makeup of the township was 96.28% White, 1.40% Native American, and 2.33% from two or more races. Hispanic or Latinos of any race were 0.47% of the population. By the 2020 census, its population declined to 169.

In 2000, there were 99 households, out of which 21.2% had children under the age of 18 living with them, 54.5% were married couples living together, 2.0% had a female householder with no husband present, and 35.4% were non-families. 31.3% of all households were made up of individuals, and 12.1% had someone living alone who was 65 years of age or older. The average household size was 2.17 and the average family size was 2.72. In the township the population was spread out, with 21.4% under the age of 18, 4.2% from 18 to 24, 23.3% from 25 to 44, 36.7% from 45 to 64, and 14.4% who were 65 years of age or older. The median age was 46 years. For every 100 females, there were 102.8 males. For every 100 females age 18 and over, there were 96.5 males.

In 2000, the median income for a household in the township was $30,469, and the median income for a family was $33,750. Males had a median income of $32,813 versus $20,000 for females. The per capita income for the township was $18,289. About 8.3% of families and 12.9% of the population were below the poverty line, including 20.5% of those under the age of eighteen and 25.0% of those 65 or over. As of 2021, its median household income was $56,136.
