= Luce County Airport =

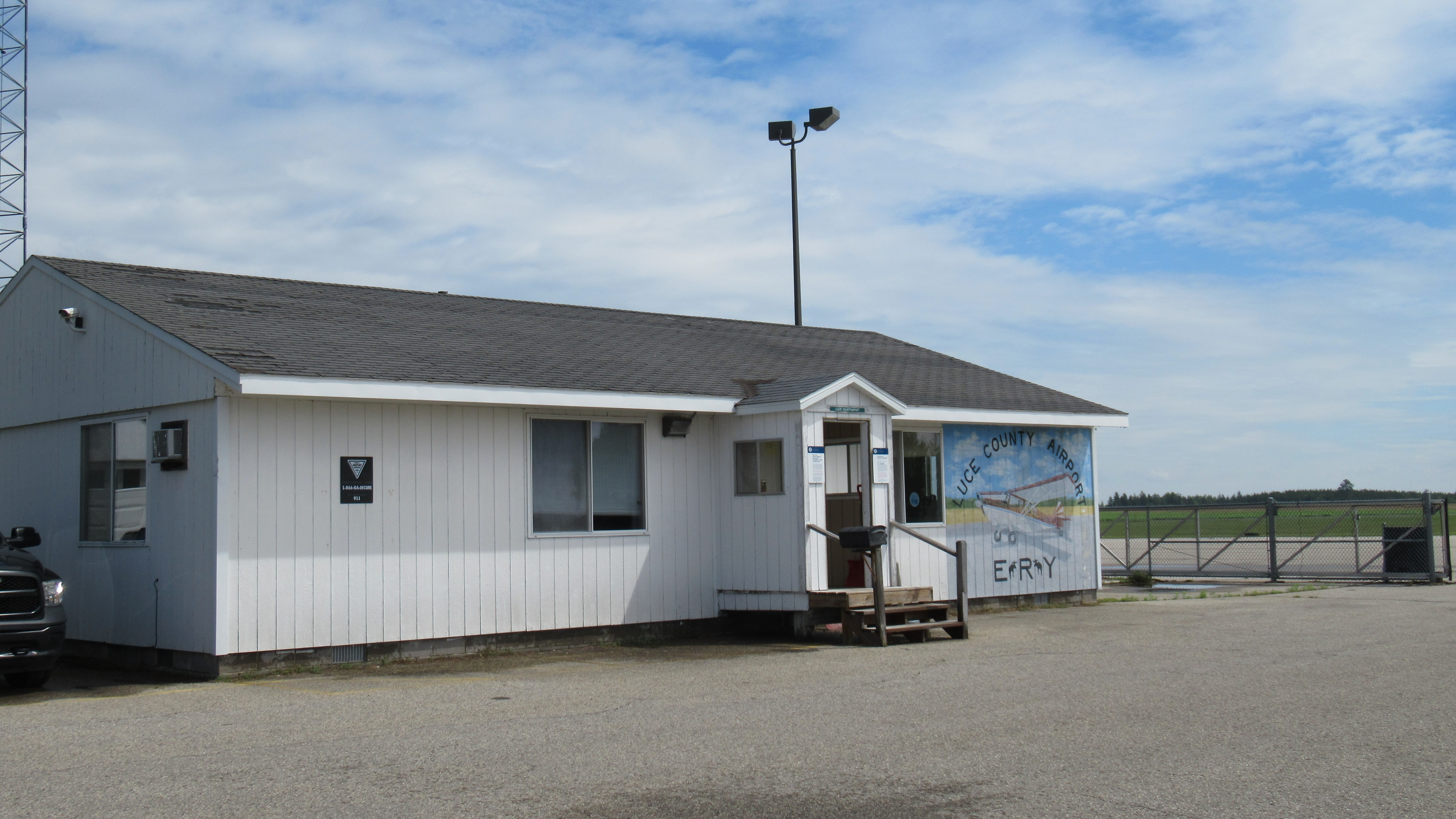
- Main building along County Road 399
- IATA: none; ICAO: KERY; FAA LID: ERY

Summary
- Airport type: Public
- Owner: Luce County
- Serves: Newberry, Michigan
- Elevation AMSL: 869 ft / 265 m
- Coordinates: 46°18′39.60″N 085°27′25.80″W

Map
- Location of airport in Michigan ERY (the United States)

Runways
Direction	Length		Surface
Direction	ft	m	Surface
11/29	4,304	1,312	Asphalt
4/22	2,856	871	Turf

Statistics (2022)
- Aircraft operations: 3,000
- Based aircraft: 9
- Source: Federal Aviation Administration

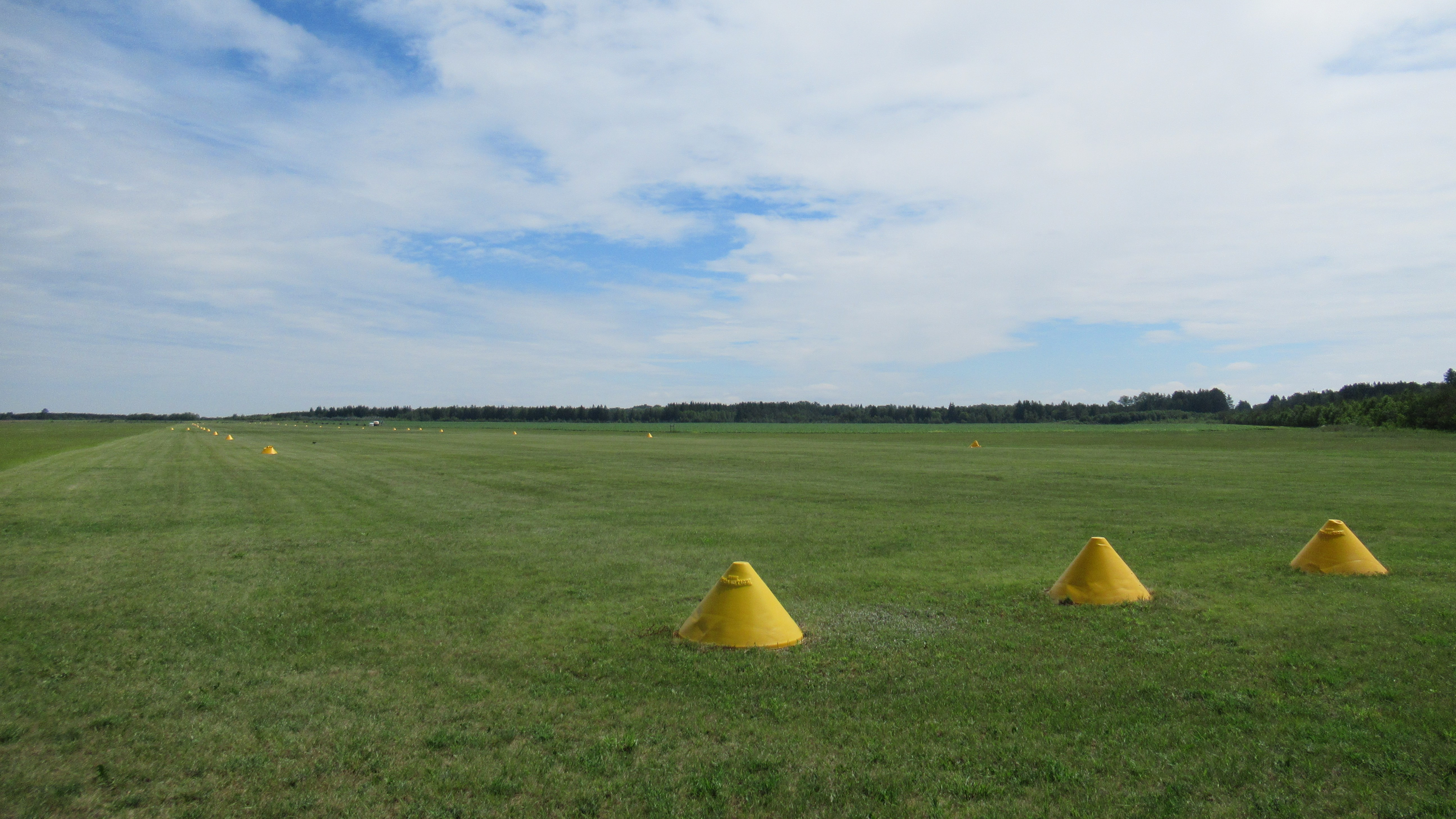
Looking northeast along the main runway

Luce County Airport (ICAO: KERY, FAA LID: ERY) is a county-owned public-use airport located three miles (4.8 km) southeast of the central business district of Newberry, a village in Luce County, Michigan, United States. It is included in the Federal Aviation Administration (FAA) National Plan of Integrated Airport Systems for 2017–2021, in which it is categorized as a basic general aviation facility.

The airport often played home to disaster relief training for agencies such as the civil air patrol.

In 2020, the airport received $20,000 from the U.S. Department of Transportation to help recover from the COVID-19 pandemic.

== Facilities and aircraft ==
Luce County Airport covers an area of 160 acres (0.65 km^{2}) and has two runways: designated 11/29 with a 4,304 x 75 ft (1,312 x 23 m) asphalt surface and 4/22 with a 2,856 x 150 ft (871 x 46 m) turf surface.

The airport has a fixed-base operator that offers avgas as well as general maintenance, a conference room, a crew lounge, and snooze rooms.

For the 12-month period ending December 31, 2022, the airport had 3,000 aircraft operations, an average of 57 per week. It was composed entirely of general aviation. In December 2022, there were 9 aircraft based at this airport, all single-engine airplanes.

== Accidents and incidents ==
- On August 22, 2003, a Staudacher S-1000 piloted by a student pilot sustained substantial damage during an on-ground collision with a visual approach slope indicator system while landing at Luce County Airport. The pilot reported a "very strong wind gust" while he was on final, and he added engine power to compensate, but the aircraft impacted the runway, bounced, and began to drift off the side. The pilot stated he saw the VASI system and "heard a thud" when the airplane impacted it. The pilot reported he was able to regain aircraft control and landed on runway 04 without further incident. The probable cause was found to be the pilot's inadequate compensation for the wind conditions, resulting in aircraft control not being maintained during the landing approach.
- On September 5, 2008, a Cessna 185 impacted power lines while on approach to the airport. The pilot said she had the sun directly in her eyes when she hit the power lines. Upon impact, the pilot added power and was able to climb to a safe altitude. She located the intended runway and landed the airplane without incident. The probable cause was found to be the pilot's failure to maintain clearance from the wires on approach. Contributing to the accident was the sunshine, as reported by the pilot.
- On September 2, 2012, a Cessna 182 Skylane collided with the terrain while landing at the Luce County Airport. The pilot reported he was on a routine fire detection mission and was about 10 to 12 miles (16 to 19 km) from the airport when he detected a “hot electrical” odor, and he decided to return to the airport. The pilot reported he entered the traffic pattern for runway 11 at KERY and set up for a stabilized approach to the runway. He reported the air was a little choppy and there was some convective turbulence in the area. While on final approach at a distance of 400 to 500 feet from the approach end of the runway, a large puff of smoke was rapidly emitted from under the right side of the instrument panel under the circuit breaker panel, momentarily distracting the pilot. At almost the same time, the airplane encountered convective turbulence that was severe enough that he hit his head on the ceiling and everything that was on the seats was thrown forward. He stated the turbulence extended his distraction. When he looked forward and turned his attention back to the airplane, the nose was down and all he could see was grass out of the windscreen. The airplane immediately hit the ground. The probable cause was found to be the pilot's failure to maintain control of the airplane due to distraction from a combination of smoke in the cockpit and a sudden turbulence encounter while on short final approach. The cause of the cockpit smoke could not be determined due to the extensive damage sustained by the airplane during the postimpact fire.

== See also ==
- List of airports in Michigan
