= John Danaher (ethicist) =

Irish legal scholar and ethicist

John Danaher is an Irish legal scholar and philosopher specialized in the legal and ethical impacts of AI and emerging technologies on society and democracy. He is a main proponent of ethical behaviorism for the treatment of moral status for robots. He also published influential works on the ethics of post-work societies.

== Life ==
Danaher studied law at University College Cork, where he received a Bachelor of Civil Law in 2006. This was followed by a Master of Laws in 2007 from Trinity College Dublin, and a PhD after study at the College of Business and Law of University College Cork, in 2011. His PhD thesis was on the theories of criminal responsibility in light of scientific advances, advised by Mary Donnelly. During this time, he was an Irish Research Council scholar.

Danaher became a lecturer at Keele University in 2011, where he stayed until 2014. He joined University of Galway in the same year, where he is currently a senior lecturer (associate professor) in the School of Law.

Danaher is a fellow of the Institute for Ethics and Emerging Technologies. His works have appeared in The Atlantic, VICE: Motherboard, The Guardian, The Irish Times, The Sunday Times, Aeon, and The Philosophers’ Magazine.

== Bibliography ==
- Danaher, John; McArthur, Neil, eds. (13 October 2017). Robot Sex: Social and Ethical Implications. MIT Press. ISBN 978-0-262-34199-8.
- Danaher, John (24 September 2019). Automation and Utopia: Human Flourishing in a World without Work. Harvard University Press. doi:10.2307/j.ctvn5txpc. ISBN 978-0-674-98424-0. JSTOR j.ctvn5txpc.
- Zerilli, John; Danaher, John; Maclaurin, James; Gavaghan, Colin; Knott, Alistair; Liddicoat, Joy; Noorman, Merel E. (2021). A citizen's guide to artificial intelligence. Cambridge, Massachusetts: The MIT Press. ISBN 978-0-262-04481-3.
- Danaher, John (14 February 2022), "Automation and the Future of Work", in Véliz, Carissa (ed.), Oxford Handbook of Digital Ethics, Oxford University Press, pp. 748–768, doi:10.1093/oxfordhb/9780198857815.013.37, ISBN 978-0-19-885781-5
- Danaher, John (10 May 2022), "Freedom in an Age of Algocracy", in Vallor, Shannon (ed.), The Oxford Handbook of Philosophy of Technology, Oxford University Press, pp. 249–272, doi:10.1093/oxfordhb/9780190851187.013.16, ISBN 978-0-19-085118-7
