= Newberry, Michigan =

- Village
- Village of Newberry
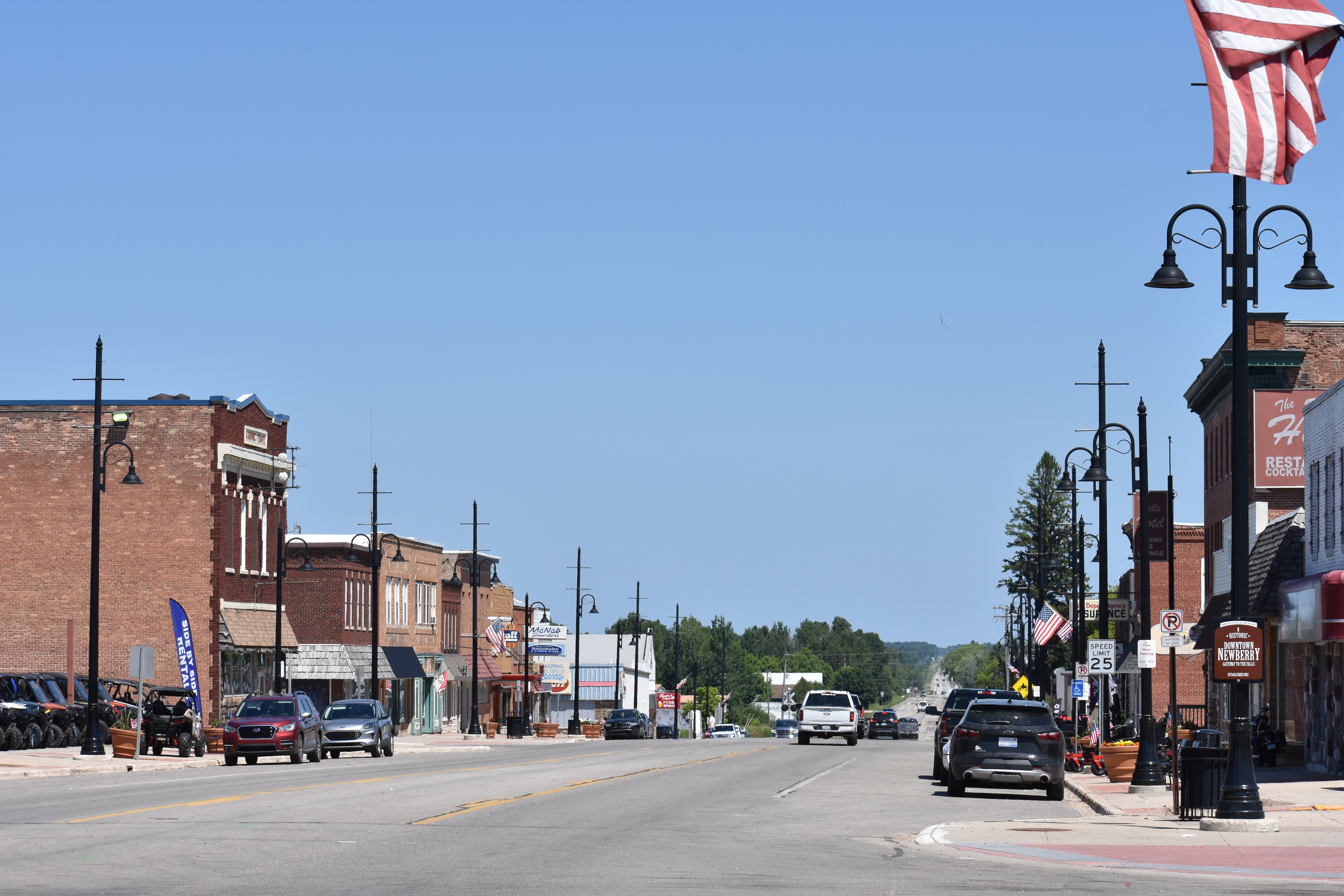
- Downtown looking north along M-123
- Nickname: The Moose Capital of Michigan
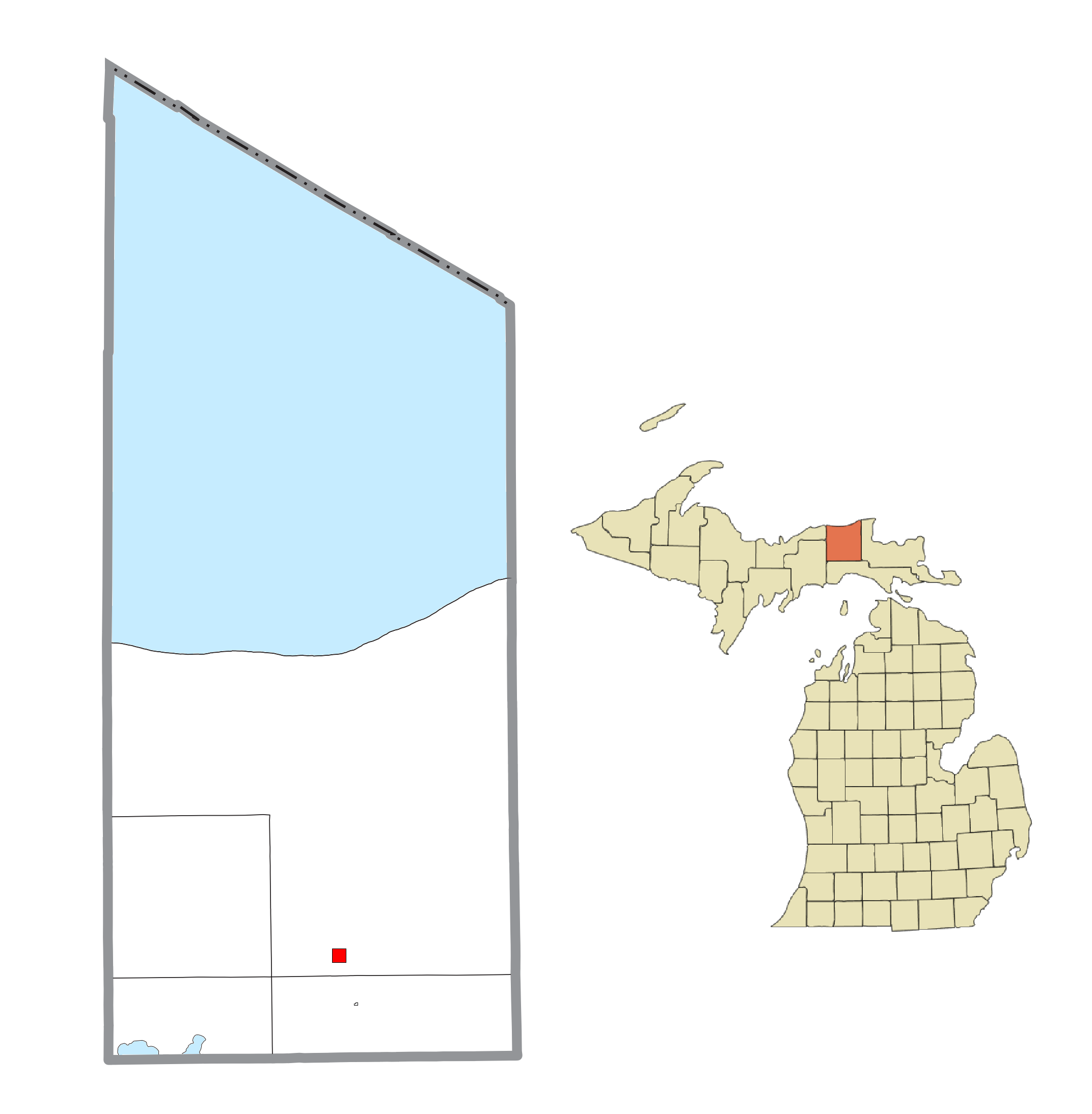
- Location within Luce County

- Location within the state of Michigan Location within the United States
- Coordinates: 46°21′08″N 85°30′38″W
- Country: United States
- State: Michigan
- County: Luce
- Township: McMillan
- Founded: 1882

Government
  - Type: Village council

Area
  - Total: 0.98 sq mi (2.54 km^{2})
  - Land: 0.98 sq mi (2.54 km^{2})
  - Water: 0 sq mi (0.00 km^{2})
- Elevation: 778 ft (237 m)

Population (2020)
  - Total: 1,446
  - Density: 1,473.3/sq mi (568.83/km^{2})
- Time zone: UTC−5 (Eastern (EST))
  - Summer (DST): UTC−4 (EDT)
- ZIP code(s): 49868
- Area code: 906
- FIPS code: 26-57140
- GNIS feature ID: 2399490
- Website: Official website

Newberry (/ˈnuːbɛəri/ NOO-bair-ee) is a village in and the county seat of Luce County in the U.S. state of Michigan. The village is located within McMillan Township and is the only incorporated community in Luce County. The population was 1,446 at the 2020 census.

Newberry is surrounded by state and national forests and is considered the southern gateway to the Tahquamenon Falls area, which the other being Paradise to the northeast. Newberry was designated as "the Moose Capital of Michigan" by the state legislature. The Newberry Correctional Facility is located just south of the village.

== History ==
Newberry was founded in 1882 and became the county seat when Luce County was separated from Chippewa County in 1887. Its first courthouse was completed in 1890.

The village was named in honor of John Stoughton Newberry, a U.S. Representative and industrialist from the state of Michigan.

Historic preservationists lost the 1970s fight to save the county's Victorian courthouse, but managed to keep the elaborate sheriff's house, now the Luce County Historical Museum.

=== Wildfires ===
The Newberry area was the location of two major wildfires. The Sleeper Lakes Fire took place in August 2007 and burned approximately 29 square miles (75.1 km^{2}) just north of Newberry. In May 2012, the Duck Lake Fire burned approximately 34 square miles (88.1 km^{2}) of forests near Tahquamenon Falls State Park to the northeast. Both wildfires were caused by lightning strikes. While the village itself was not threatened, firefighting efforts were coordinated in Newberry.

== Geography ==
According to the United States Census Bureau, the village has a total area of 0.98 square miles (2.54 km^{2}), all of it land.

=== Climate ===
According to the Köppen Climate Classification system, Newberry has a humid continental climate, abbreviated "Dfb" on climate maps. A humid continental climate (Köppen prefix D and a third letter of a or b) is a climatic region defined by large seasonal temperature differences, with warm to hot (and often humid) summers and cold (sometimes severely cold in the northern areas) winters. Precipitation is usually distributed throughout the year. The definition of this climate regarding temperature is as follows: the mean temperature of the coldest month must be below −3 °C (26.6 °F) and there must be at least four months whose mean temperatures are at or above 10 °C (50 °F). In addition, the location in question must not be semi-arid or arid. The Dfb, Dwb and Dsb subtypes are also known as hemiboreal.

Climate data for Newberry Correctional Facility, Michigan (1991–2020 normals, extremes 1896–present)
Month	Jan	Feb	Mar	Apr	May	Jun	Jul	Aug	Sep	Oct	Nov	Dec	Year
Record high °F (°C)	51 (11)	56 (13)	74 (23)	84 (29)	93 (34)	99 (37)	103 (39)	98 (37)	96 (36)	82 (28)	71 (22)	60 (16)	103 (39)
Mean daily maximum °F (°C)	23.3 (−4.8)	26.3 (−3.2)	35.3 (1.8)	48.4 (9.1)	62.3 (16.8)	72.6 (22.6)	76.7 (24.8)	75.5 (24.2)	67.7 (19.8)	53.8 (12.1)	39.9 (4.4)	29.0 (−1.7)	50.9 (10.5)
Daily mean °F (°C)	16.5 (−8.6)	18.0 (−7.8)	26.5 (−3.1)	38.6 (3.7)	51.1 (10.6)	61.1 (16.2)	65.7 (18.7)	64.9 (18.3)	57.9 (14.4)	45.5 (7.5)	33.7 (0.9)	22.8 (−5.1)	41.9 (5.5)
Mean daily minimum °F (°C)	9.7 (−12.4)	9.8 (−12.3)	17.8 (−7.9)	28.8 (−1.8)	39.9 (4.4)	49.6 (9.8)	54.8 (12.7)	54.2 (12.3)	48.1 (8.9)	37.2 (2.9)	27.4 (−2.6)	16.6 (−8.6)	32.8 (0.4)
Record low °F (°C)	−30 (−34)	−32 (−36)	−23 (−31)	−3 (−19)	0 (−18)	24 (−4)	28 (−2)	28 (−2)	18 (−8)	4 (−16)	−10 (−23)	−22 (−30)	−32 (−36)
Average precipitation inches (mm)	2.19 (56)	1.33 (34)	1.99 (51)	2.56 (65)	2.77 (70)	3.03 (77)	3.28 (83)	3.03 (77)	3.95 (100)	4.31 (109)	2.91 (74)	2.49 (63)	33.84 (860)
Source: NOAA

== Demographics ==
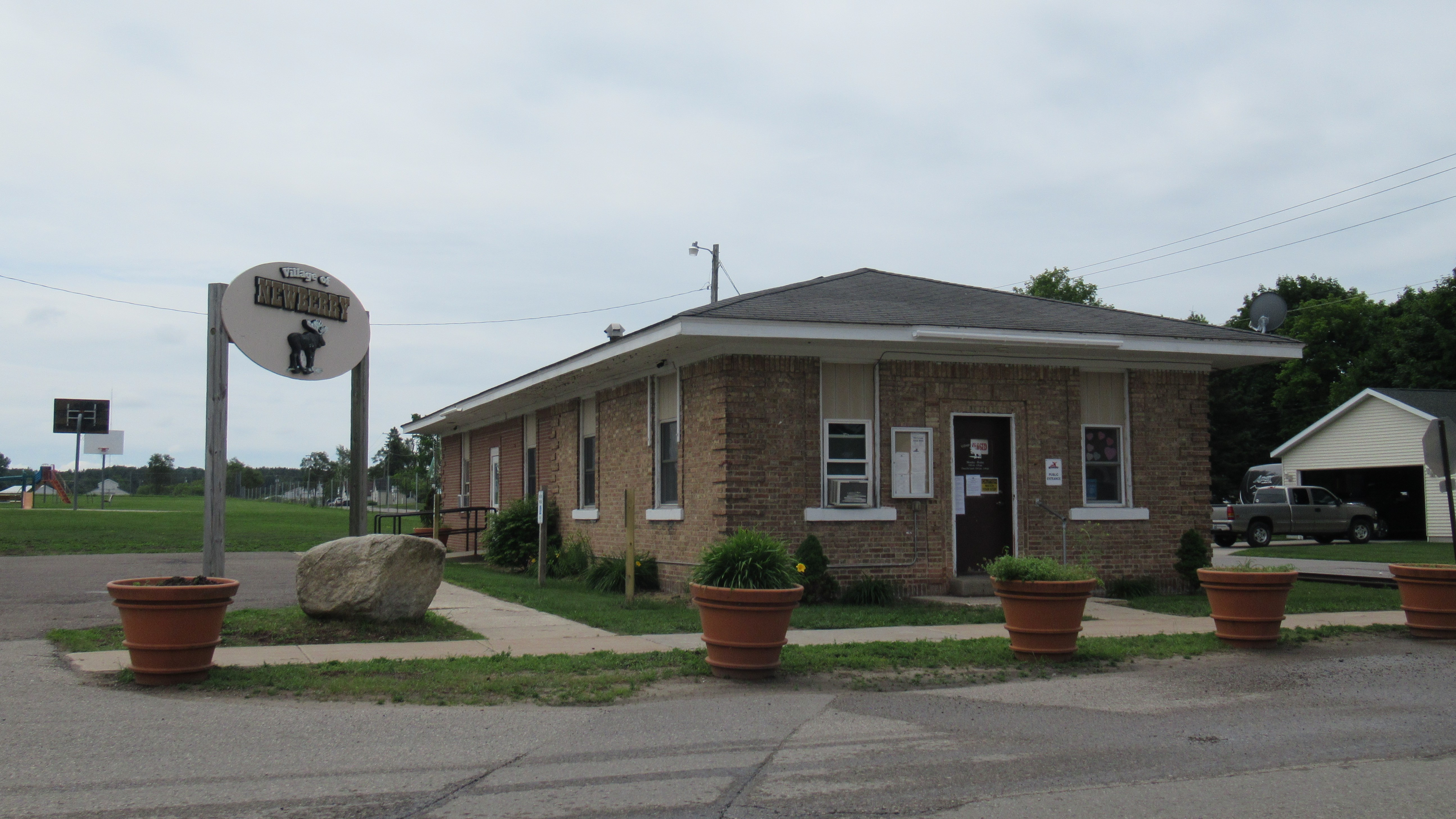
Newberry Village Office

Historical population
Census	Pop.	Note	%±
1890	1,115		—
1900	1,015		−9.0%
1910	1,182		16.5%
1920	2,172		83.8%
1930	2,465		13.5%
1940	2,732		10.8%
1950	2,802		2.6%
1960	2,612		−6.8%
1970	2,334		−10.6%
1980	2,120		−9.2%
1990	1,873		−11.7%
2000	1,686		−10.0%
2010	1,519		−9.9%
2020	1,446		−4.8%
U.S. Decennial Census

At the 2020 census, its population was 1,446. In 2010, there were 1,519 people, 652 households, and 380 families residing in the village. The population density was 1,550.0 inhabitants per square mile (598.5/km^{2}). There were 796 housing units at an average density of 812.2 per square mile (313.6/km^{2}). The racial makeup of the village was 89.3% White, 0.4% African American, 6.3% Native American, 0.3% Asian, 0.1% Pacific Islander, and 3.6% from two or more races. Hispanic or Latinos of any race were 2.8% of the population.As of the census of 2000, there were 1,686 people, 717 households, and 456 families residing in the village. The population density was 2,737.1 inhabitants per square mile (1,056.8/km^{2}). There were 824 housing units at an average density of 839.7 per square mile (324.2/km^{2}). The racial makeup of the village was 69.92% White, 19.29% African American, 4.95% Native American, 0.67% Asian, 0.04% Pacific Islander, 1.01% from other races, and 4.13% from two or more races. Hispanic or Latinos of any race were 3.69% of the population.

In 2010, there were 652 households, of which 30.1% had children under the age of 18 living with them, 39.1% were married couples living together, 14.3% had a female householder with no husband present, 4.9% had a male householder with no wife present, and 41.7% were non-families. 37.6% of all households were made up of individuals, and 15.7% had someone living alone who was 65 years of age or older. The average household size was 2.26 and the average family size was 2.93. In 2000, there were 717 households, of which 32.6% had children under the age of 18 living with them, 46.7% were married couples living together, 12.4% had a female householder with no husband present, and 36.4% were non-families. 32.5% of all households were made up of individuals, and 18.0% had someone living alone who was 65 years of age or older. The average household size was 2.36 and the average family size was 2.95.

As of 2000, the median income for a household in the village was $29,052, and the median income for a family was $36,607. Males had a median income of $29,286 versus $20,956 for females. The per capita income for the village was $17,224. About 15.6% of families and 18.1% of the population were below the poverty line, including 27.5% of those under age 18 and 8.4% of those age 65 or over. By the 2021 census estimates, its median household income was $40,893.

== Education ==
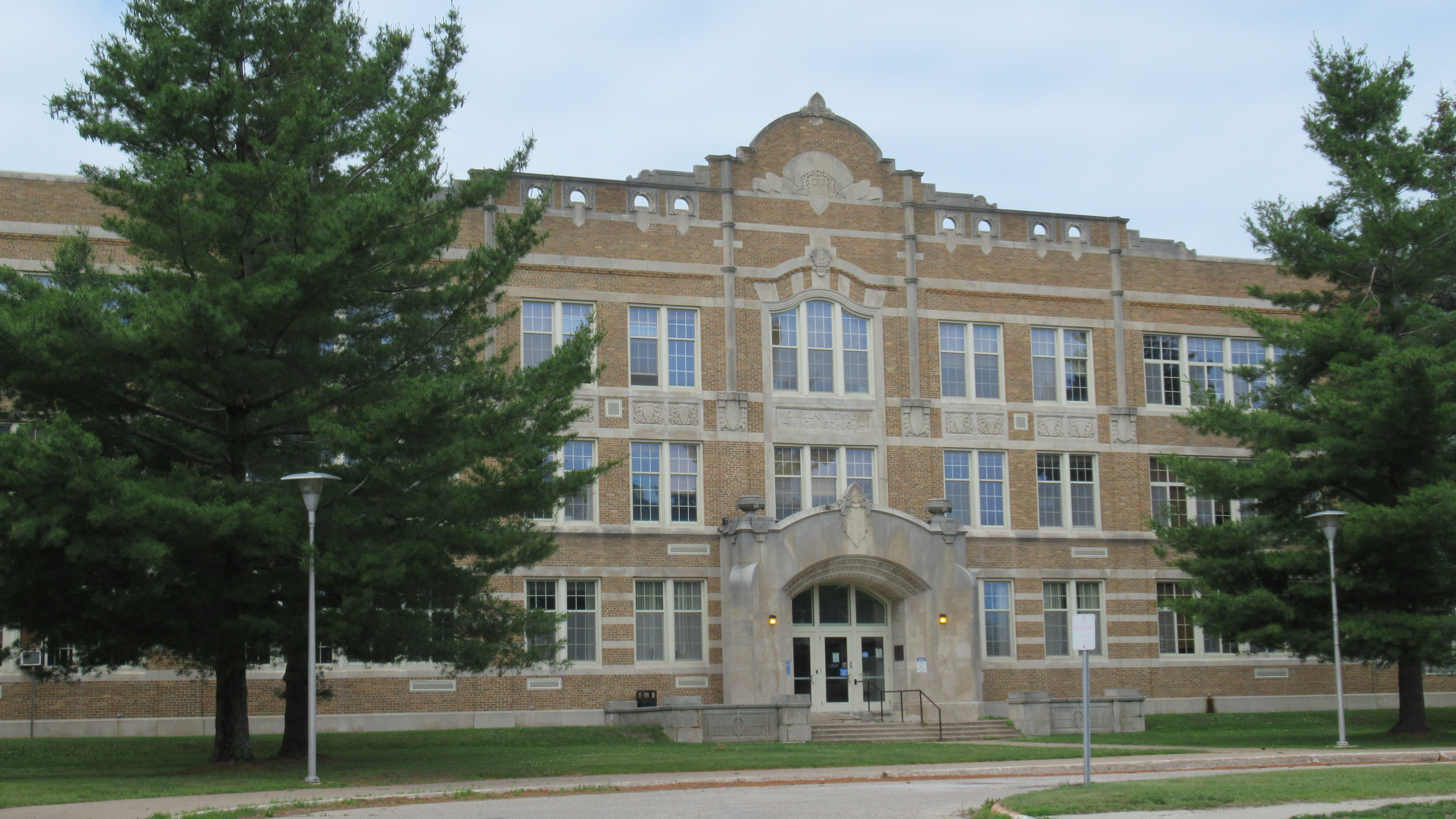
McMillan Township High School, now referred to as Newberry High School, was built in 1926.

The village is served by Tahquamenon Area Schools, which contains a single main campus within Newberry. The school district serves all of Luce County. The district also serves Hulbert Township to the east in Chippewa County, as well as Seney Township to the west in Alger County. Most of Portage Township to the south in Mackinac County is also served by Tahquamenon Area Schools.

The school district serves an area of 1,524 square miles (3,950 km^{2}), which ranks it as the largest public school district in the state by area. It is also noted as the largest school district in the country east of the Mississippi River. The district enrolled 573 students for the 2019–2020 school year.

== Media ==
The Newberry community has been served by The Newberry News, a weekly independent newspaper, since 1886.

In addition to radio stations broadcasting directly from Newberry, radio stations from the Sault Ste. Marie market can also be heard in the community.

- 96.7 FM – WMJT Flash FM (Rock) Serving Newberry and Luce County, Michigan
- 1450 AM – WNBY-AM (Classic country)
- 88.7 FM – W204AQ (Christian adult contemporary)
- 93.9 FM – WNBY-FM (Oldies)
- 96.7 FM – WMJT (Classic hits)
- 97.9 FM – WIHC (Christian talk)
- 99.7 FM – W259AD (Christian talk & music)

== Transportation ==
=== Major highways ===
- M-28 travels east–west and passes about 3 miles (4.8 km) south of the village limits.
- M-123 runs north–south through the center of Newberry.

=== Bus service ===
- Indian Trails provides daily intercity bus service between St. Ignace and Ironwood.

=== Rail ===
- Canadian National Railway provides freight rail service with a small depot located in Newberry.

=== Airport ===
- Luce County Airport is a county-owned public-use general aviation airport that serves Newberry. It is located in Pentland Township about 3 miles (4.8 km) to the southeast.

== Notable people ==
- Ian Fishback, Retired Special Forces Major, was from Newberry.
- Terry O'Quinn, who plays John Locke on Lost, is from Newberry.
- Rob Rubick, former Detroit Lion and analyst for Fox Sports Detroit, is from Newberry.
- Len St. Jean, a former Boston Patriot, is from Newberry.
