= Luce County, Michigan =

County in Michigan, United States

- County
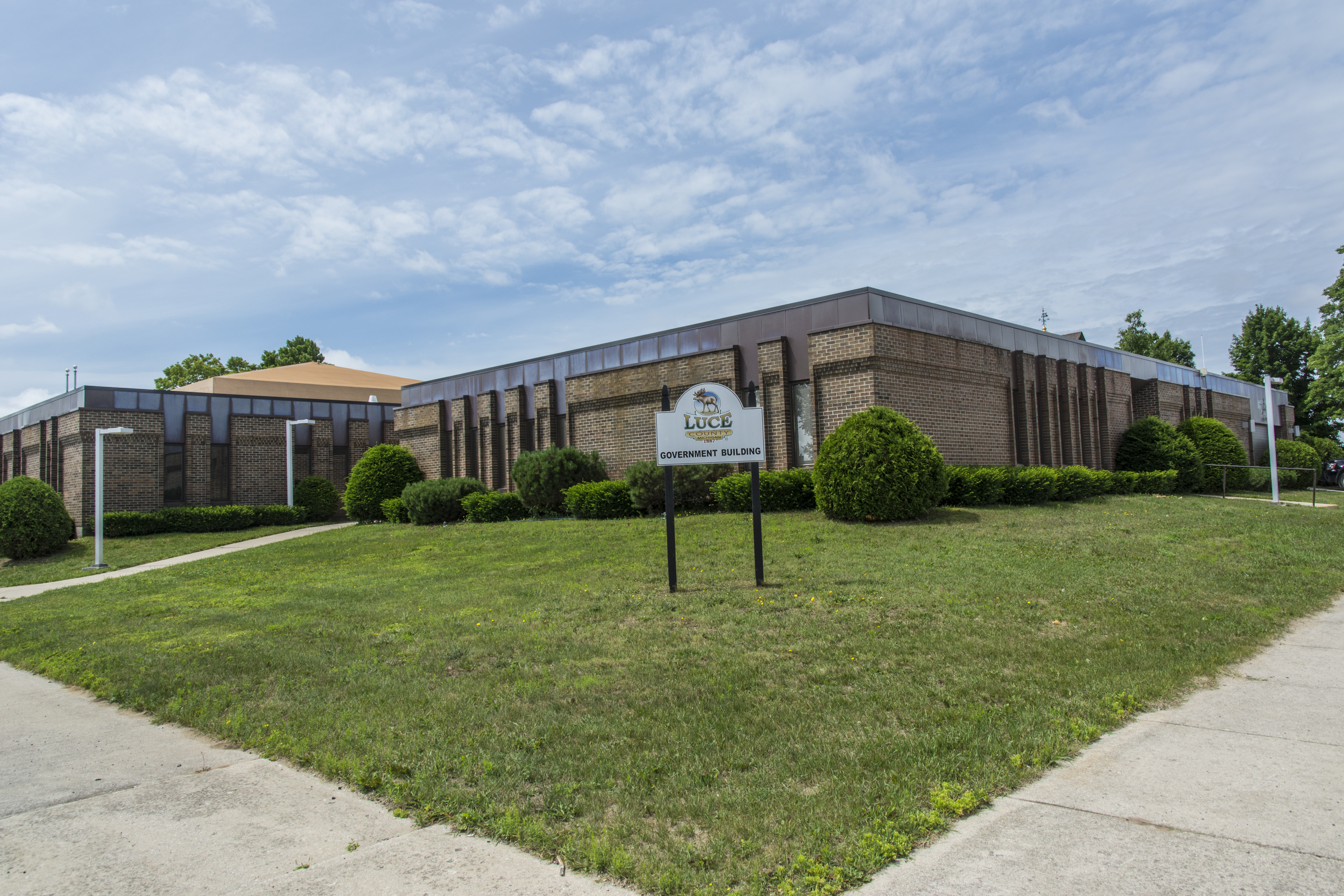
- Luce County Courthouse in Newberry

- Location within the U.S. state of Michigan
- Coordinates: 46°17′N 85°20′W
- Country: United States
- State: Michigan
- Founded: 1887
- Named for: Cyrus G. Luce
- Seat: Newberry
- Largest village: Newberry

Area
  - Total: 1,912 sq mi (4,950 km^{2})
  - Land: 899 sq mi (2,330 km^{2})
  - Water: 1,013 sq mi (2,620 km^{2}) 53%

Population (2020)
  - Total: 5,339
  - Estimate (2025): 6,339 ▲
  - Density: 5.94/sq mi (2.29/km^{2})
- Time zone: UTC−5 (Eastern)
  - Summer (DST): UTC−4 (EDT)
- Congressional district: 1st
- Website: www.lucecountymi.com

Luce County (/luːs/ LOOS) is a county located in the Upper Peninsula in the U.S. state of Michigan. As of the 2020 census, the population was 5,339, making it the second-least populous county in Michigan (behind Keweenaw County). The county seat is Newberry, Luce County's only incorporated community. The county was set off and organized in 1887 and named after former Michigan Governor Cyrus G. Luce. In 2002, Newberry was designated as the moose capital of Michigan by the state legislature. Luce County is served by The Newberry News, a weekly community newspaper that began in 1886.

== Geography ==
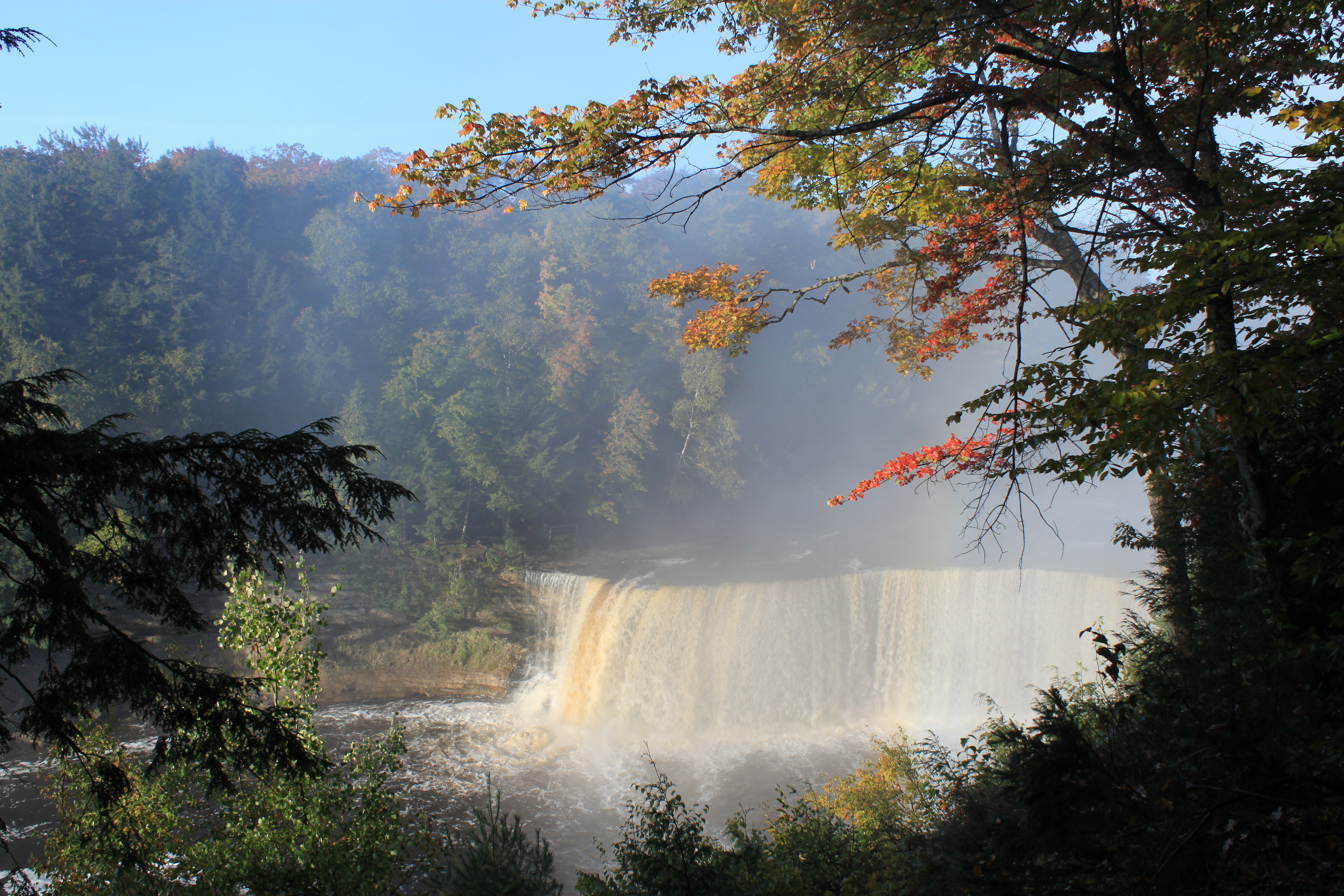
Upper Tahquamenon Falls

According to the U.S. Census Bureau, the county has a total area of 1,912 sq mi (4,950 km^{2}), of which 899 sq mi (2,330 km^{2}) is land and 1,013 sq mi (2,620 km^{2}) (53%) is water. Luce County is part of the Upper Peninsula of Michigan. It has a northern border with Canada across Lake Superior.

McMillan Township, the largest municipality in Michigan by land area (at 588.78 square miles (1,524.9 km^{2}) of total land area), is part of Luce County.

=== Major highways ===
- M-28 is Michigan's longest state trunkline highway. An east–west route, M-28 can be used to access Sault Ste. Marie to the east, and Munising and Marquette to the west.
- M-117 is a north–south connector between M-28 west of Newberry to US 2 in Mackinac County.
- M-123 is a u-shaped highway, beginning at M-28 south of Newberry. Motorists also use M-123 to access Tahquamenon Falls and Whitefish Point.
- H-33
- H-37
- H-44
- H-58

=== Airport ===
Luce County Airport (KERY), provides service for the county and surrounding communities.

=== Adjacent counties ===
- Chippewa County (east)
- Mackinac County (south)
- Schoolcraft County (southwest)
- Alger County (west)
- Thunder Bay District, Ontario (north)
- Algoma District, Ontario (northeast)

== Communities ==
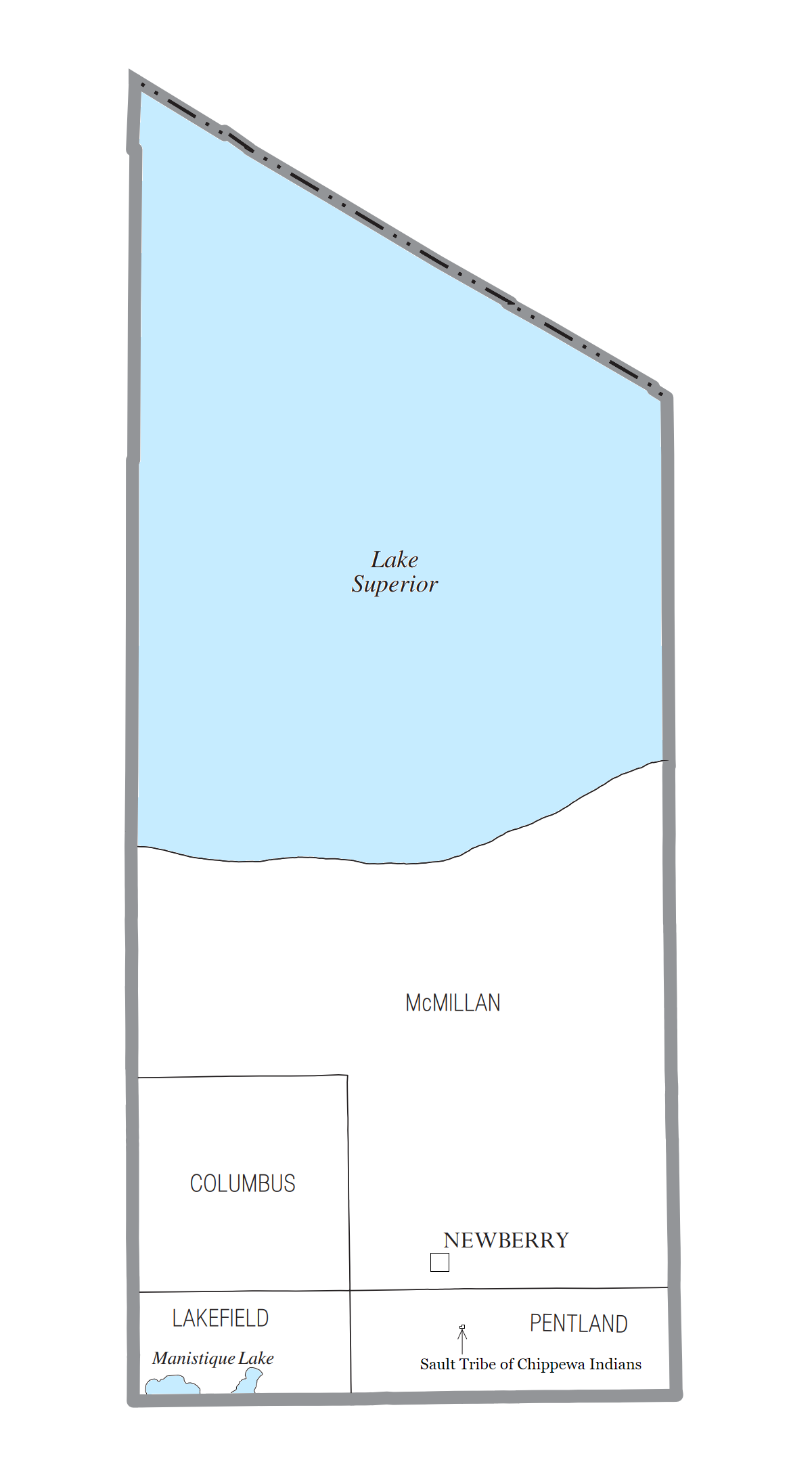
U.S. Census data map showing local municipal boundaries within Luce County.

=== Village ===
- Newberry (county seat)

=== Civil townships ===
- Columbus Township
- Lakefield Township
- McMillan Township
- Pentland Township

=== Unincorporated communities ===
- Betty B Landing
- Carpenter Landing
- Danaher
- Deer Park
- Dollarville
- Eightmile Corner
- Fourmile Corner
- Helmer
- Laketon
- Lencel
- Marks
- McLeods Corner
- McMillan
- McMillan Corner
- McPhees Landing
- Natalie
- Pine Stump Junction
- Roberts Corner
- Soo Junction

=== Indian reservations ===
- Luce County contains one very small portion of the Sault Tribe of Chippewa Indians tribal community, which is headquartered in Sault Ste. Marie in Chippewa County. This small plot of land is located within Pentland Township but is administered autonomously.

== Demographics ==
Historical population
Census	Pop.	Note	%±
1890	2,455		—
1900	2,983		21.5%
1910	4,004		34.2%
1920	6,149		53.6%
1930	6,528		6.2%
1940	7,423		13.7%
1950	8,147		9.8%
1960	7,827		−3.9%
1970	6,789		−13.3%
1980	6,659		−1.9%
1990	5,763		−13.5%
2000	7,024		21.9%
2010	6,631		−5.6%
2020	5,339		−19.5%
2025 (est.)	6,339	▲	18.7%
U.S. Decennial Census; 1790-1960 1900-1990; 1990-2000 2010-2018

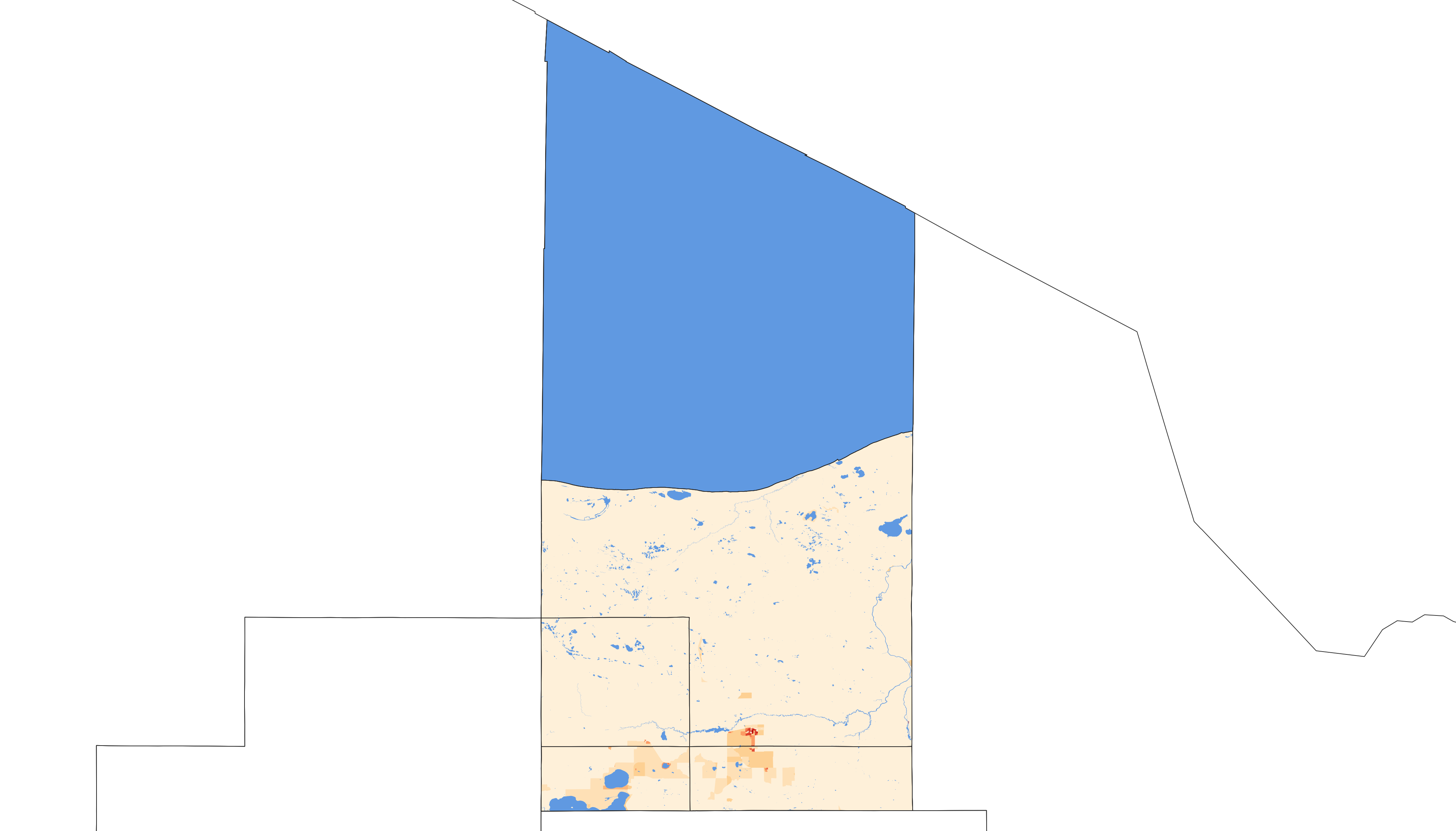
2020 population density of Luce County MI by census block

=== Racial and ethnic composition ===
Luce County, Michigan – Racial and ethnic composition Note: the US Census treats Hispanic/Latino as an ethnic category. This table excludes Latinos from the racial categories and assigns them to a separate category. Hispanics/Latinos may be of any race.
Race / Ethnicity (NH = Non-Hispanic)	Pop 1980	Pop 1990	Pop 2000	Pop 2010	Pop 2020	% 1980	% 1990	% 2000	% 2010	% 2020
White alone (NH)	6,379	5,401	5,787	5,275	4,514	95.80%	93.72%	82.39%	79.55%	84.55%
Black or African American alone (NH)	1	2	505	735	12	0.02%	0.03%	7.19%	11.08%	0.22%
Native American or Alaska Native alone (NH)	254	327	377	325	365	3.81%	5.67%	5.37%	4.90%	6.84%
Asian alone (NH)	9	6	24	17	2	0.14%	0.10%	0.34%	0.26%	0.04%
Native Hawaiian or Pacific Islander alone (NH)	x	x	2	1	0	x	x	0.03%	0.02%	0.00%
Other race alone (NH)	0	0	2	0	10	0.00%	0.00%	0.03%	0.00%	0.19%
Mixed race or Multiracial (NH)	x	x	204	196	362	x	x	2.90%	2.96%	6.78%
Hispanic or Latino (any race)	16	27	123	82	74	0.24%	0.47%	1.75%	1.24%	1.39%
Total	6,659	5,763	7,024	6,631	5,339	100.00%	100.00%	100.00%	100.00%	100.00%

=== 2020 census ===
As of the 2020 census, the county had a population of 5,339. The median age was 49.1 years. 20.1% of residents were under the age of 18 and 25.9% of residents were 65 years of age or older. For every 100 females there were 102.0 males, and for every 100 females age 18 and over there were 99.3 males age 18 and over.

The racial makeup of the county was 84.9% White, 0.2% Black or African American, 6.9% American Indian and Alaska Native, <0.1% Asian, <0.1% Native Hawaiian and Pacific Islander, 0.3% from some other race, and 7.6% from two or more races. Hispanic or Latino residents of any race comprised 1.4% of the population.

<0.1% of residents lived in urban areas, while 100.0% lived in rural areas.

There were 2,344 households in the county, of which 22.9% had children under the age of 18 living in them. Of all households, 46.5% were married-couple households, 21.3% were households with a male householder and no spouse or partner present, and 23.5% were households with a female householder and no spouse or partner present. About 31.1% of all households were made up of individuals and 16.1% had someone living alone who was 65 years of age or older.

There were 4,065 housing units, of which 42.3% were vacant. Among occupied housing units, 79.0% were owner-occupied and 21.0% were renter-occupied. The homeowner vacancy rate was 3.0% and the rental vacancy rate was 14.7%.

=== 2010 census ===
The 2010 census indicated Luce County had a population of 6,631. This is a decrease of 393 people from the 2000 United States census. This is a -5.6% change in population. In 2010 there were 2,412 households and 1,542 families residing in the county. The population density was 7 people per square mile (2.7 people/km^{2}). There were 4,343 housing units at an average density of 5 per square mile (1.9/km^{2}).

There were 2,412 households, out of which 24.3% had children under the age of 18 living with them, 50.2% were married couples living together, 9.3% had a female householder with no husband present, and 36.1% were non-families. 31.4% of all households were made up of individuals, and 13.8% had someone living alone who was 65 years of age or older. The average household size was 2.25 and the average family size was 2.77. In the county, the population was spread out, with 17.9% under the age of 18, 7.0% from 18 to 24, 27.5% from 25 to 44, 29.6% from 45 to 64, and 17.9% who were 65 years of age or older. The median age was 43 years. The population was 57.7% male and 42.3% female.

At the 2010 census, the racial makeup of the county was 80.4% White, 11.1% Black or African American, 5.0% Native American, 0.3% Asian and 3.1% of two or more races; of them, 1.2% were Hispanic or Latino (of any race). In 2010 among its population, 14.5% were of German, 7.6% French, French Canadian or Cajun, 7.4% Irish, 6.8% English, 6.3% American and 5.5% Finnish ancestry.

In 2010, the median income for a household in the county was $42,083, and the median income for a family was $49,948. The per capita income for the county was $18,294. About 12.6% of families and 16.3% of the population were below the poverty line, including 27.7% of those under age 18 and 12.5% of those age 65 or over.

=== 2017–2021 American Community Survey ===
From 2017–2021, its median household income was $49,667.

=== 2022 American Community Survey ===
At the 2022 American Community Survey, its racial makeup was 87.6% non-Hispanic white, 1% Black or African American, 6.9% Native American, 0.2% Asian American, 0.1% Pacific Islander, 4.2% multiracial, and 2% Hispanic or Latino of any race.

=== Religion ===
Religiously, the Association of Religion Data Archives in 2020 determined Christianity was the dominant religion. Roman Catholicism and the Evangelical Lutheran Church in America were the largest Christian groups in the county.

== Government ==
United States presidential election results for Luce County, Michigan
Year	Republican		Democratic		Third party(ies)	
Year	No.	%	No.	%	No.	%
1888	212	53.54%	172	43.43%	12	3.03%
1892	234	55.45%	160	37.91%	28	6.64%
1896	358	57.01%	236	37.58%	34	5.41%
1900	405	70.31%	159	27.60%	12	2.08%
1904	364	80.89%	63	14.00%	23	5.11%
1908	354	70.66%	108	21.56%	39	7.78%
1912	234	37.38%	102	16.29%	290	46.33%
1916	527	65.30%	257	31.85%	23	2.85%
1920	708	76.54%	187	20.22%	30	3.24%
1924	850	80.65%	112	10.63%	92	8.73%
1928	1,466	80.24%	350	19.16%	11	0.60%
1932	1,259	56.33%	928	41.52%	48	2.15%
1936	1,199	47.67%	1,297	51.57%	19	0.76%
1940	1,542	58.92%	1,069	40.85%	6	0.23%
1944	1,195	59.96%	790	39.64%	8	0.40%
1948	1,273	67.46%	570	30.21%	44	2.33%
1952	1,603	74.25%	553	25.61%	3	0.14%
1956	1,734	72.55%	651	27.24%	5	0.21%
1960	1,534	64.94%	828	35.06%	0	0.00%
1964	871	37.37%	1,459	62.59%	1	0.04%
1968	1,351	58.33%	855	36.92%	110	4.75%
1972	1,579	63.49%	862	34.66%	46	1.85%
1976	1,379	55.27%	1,099	44.05%	17	0.68%
1980	1,659	57.56%	992	34.42%	231	8.02%
1984	1,715	66.97%	833	32.53%	13	0.51%
1988	1,528	63.22%	864	35.75%	25	1.03%
1992	958	36.80%	972	37.34%	673	25.85%
1996	964	39.20%	1,107	45.02%	388	15.78%
2000	1,480	58.36%	956	37.70%	100	3.94%
2004	1,749	61.82%	1,045	36.94%	35	1.24%
2008	1,490	54.38%	1,191	43.47%	59	2.15%
2012	1,580	60.86%	991	38.17%	25	0.96%
2016	1,756	67.77%	681	26.28%	154	5.94%
2020	2,109	70.14%	842	28.00%	56	1.86%
2024	2,170	72.70%	769	25.76%	46	1.54%

United States Senate election results for Luce County, Michigan1
Year	Republican		Democratic		Third party(ies)	
Year	No.	%	No.	%	No.	%
2024	2,096	71.15%	771	26.17%	79	2.68%

Michigan Gubernatorial election results for Luce County
Year	Republican		Democratic		Third party(ies)	
Year	No.	%	No.	%	No.	%
2022	1,520	64.24%	786	33.22%	60	2.54%

The county government operates the jail, maintains rural roads, operates the major local courts, keeps files of deeds and mortgages, maintains vital records, administers public health regulations, and participates with the state in the provision of welfare and other social services. The county board of commissioners controls the budget but has only limited authority to make laws or ordinances. In Michigan, most local government functions — police and fire, building and zoning, tax assessment, street maintenance, etc. — are the responsibility of individual cities and townships.

=== Elected officials ===
- Prosecuting Attorney: Cameron Harwell
- Sheriff: Eric Gravelle
- County Clerk/Register of Deeds: Sharon J. Price
- County Treasurer: Belinda Bridges

(information as of March 2024)

== See also ==
- List of Michigan State Historic Sites in Luce County, Michigan
- National Register of Historic Places listings in Luce County, Michigan

== Bibliography ==
- "Bibliography on Luce County".
