= 2004 United States presidential election in Michigan =

- November 2, 2004
- Turnout: 64.7% ▲

Nominee	John Kerry	George W. Bush
Party	Democratic	Republican
Home state	Massachusetts	Texas
Running mate	John Edwards	Dick Cheney
Electoral vote	17	0
Popular vote	2,479,183	2,313,746
Percentage	51.23%	47.81%

Kerry
40–50%
50–60%
60–70%
70–80%
80–90%
90–100%
Bush
40–50%
50–60%
60–70%
70–80%
80–90%
Tie
40–50%
President before election
George W. Bush
Republican
Elected President
George W. Bush
Republican

The 2004 United States presidential election in Michigan took place on November 2, 2004, and was part of the 2004 United States presidential election. Voters chose 17 representatives, or electors to the Electoral College, who voted for president and vice president.

Michigan was won by Democratic nominee John Kerry by a 3.4% margin of victory. Although no Republican carried this state in a presidential election since Bush's father George H. W. Bush in 1988, early polling showed the race was a toss-up, thus was considered as a possible target for the Republicans. Prior to the election, most news organizations considered this a toss-up, or a crucial swing state. Later polling favored Kerry, leading more than half of the news organizations to predict that Kerry would win the state, but the other less than half still considered it a swing state. Although the State of Michigan voted for the Democratic presidential nominee in six subsequent elections since 1992, the margins of victory had become smaller over the past elections. On election day, Kerry won the state with 51.23% of the vote, but won only 15 of the 83 counties in Michigan. Most of these 15 counties have the highest populations in the state. The biggest key to Kerry's victory was winning Wayne County with 69.39% of the vote.

Bush was the first president elected to two terms in office without carrying Michigan either time since Woodrow Wilson in 1912 and 1916, and is to date the only Republican presidential candidate to win the presidency without carrying the state at least once, as well as the most recent Republican to win without the state. Although Michigan was also not carried by the winner of the 2000 presidential race, the election also marked the first time since 1976 that Michigan voted against the winner of the national popular vote. Bush was the first Republican to win the national popular vote without Michigan since the 1968 presidential race. This also marked the first time since 1940 that an incumbent president won reelection without carrying Michigan.

As of 2024, this is the most recent election to date in which Michigan would vote for the losing candidate, thus the state is tied with Wisconsin and Pennsylvania for the longest bellwether streak in the nation. This was also only the fourth and most recent time since 1948 (after 2000, 1976, and 1968) that it would vote for the losing candidate.

== Caucuses ==
- 2004 Michigan Democratic presidential caucuses

== Campaign ==
=== Predictions ===
There were 12 news organizations who made state-by-state predictions of the election. Here are their last predictions before election day.

Source	Ranking
D.C. Political Report	Lean D
Cook Political Report	Lean D
Research 2000	Lean D
Zogby International	Likely D
Washington Post	Tossup
Washington Dispatch	Likely D
Washington Times	Lean D
The New York Times	Lean D
CNN	Likely D
Newsweek	Lean D
Associated Press	Tossup
Rasmussen Reports	Tossup

=== Polling ===
Pre-election polling showed a close race early on, but in the fall election, Kerry pulled away and won every poll since the month of September. The last three polls' average showed Kerry leading 49% to 46%.

=== Fundraising ===
Bush raised $4,960,010. Kerry raised $2,496,203.

=== Advertising and visits ===
In the fall campaign, Bush visited the state ten times. Kerry visited seven times. Both candidates combined spent over $2 million in advertising each week, but Kerry spent slightly more each week.

== Analysis ==
Kerry won Michigan with 51.2% and by a margin of 3.4%. While this was a reduced margin with respect to Gore's in 2000, the state trended Democratic in 2004 relative to the nation. Bush won a majority of the state's counties and congressional districts, holding Kerry to only 15 counties (whereas Gore had carried 24). But he underperformed previous Republicans in two large suburban counties that had recently been Republican strongholds in the state, Oakland and Macomb Counties. Kerry narrowly held onto Oakland County, which has a more white-collar populace and had voted Republican in every election from 1940 through 1992 save 1964, and had voted to re-elect Bill Clinton in 1996 by only 4.3%. Bush did flip the more blue-collar Macomb County, which Gore had become the second Democrat to carry after a twenty-year run of voting Republican from 1972 through 1992, but he carried it by only 1.4%, making it still slightly bluer than the nation. Meanwhile, Kerry maintained the traditional Democratic domination of Wayne County, winning about the same 69% vote share in it that Gore had won in 2000. Michigan had voted Republican in every election from 1972 through 1988, in all of which Oakland and Macomb had given the Republican a healthy margin.

== Results ==
2004 United States presidential election in Michigan
Party	Candidate	Votes	Percentage	Electoral votes
Democratic	John Kerry	2,479,183	51.23%	17
Republican	George W. Bush (incumbent)	2,313,746	47.81%	0
Independent	Ralph Nader	24,035	0.50%	0
Libertarian	Michael Badnarik	10,552	0.22%	0
Green	David Cobb	5,325	0.11%	0
US Taxpayers	Michael Peroutka	4,980	0.10%	0
Natural Law	Walt Brown	1,431	0.03%	0
Totals		4,839,252	100.00%	17
Voter turnout (voting age population)				64.2%

=== By county ===
County	John Kerry Democratic		George W. Bush Republican		Various candidates Other parties		Margin		Total votes cast
County	#	%	#	%	#	%	#	%	Total votes cast
Alcona	2,871	43.96%	3,592	55.00%	68	1.04%	-721	-11.04%	6,531
Alger	2,395	50.26%	2,318	48.65%	52	1.09%	77	1.61%	4,765
Allegan	19,355	35.90%	34,022	63.11%	530	0.98%	-14,667	-27.21%	53,907
Alpena	7,407	48.70%	7,665	50.39%	139	0.91%	-258	-1.69%	15,211
Antrim	5,072	37.24%	8,379	61.52%	168	1.23%	-3,307	-24.28%	13,619
Arenac	4,076	49.61%	4,071	49.55%	69	0.84%	5	0.06%	8,216
Baraga	1,660	45.06%	1,977	53.66%	47	1.28%	-317	-8.60%	3,684
Barry	11,312	37.37%	18,638	61.57%	322	1.06%	-7,326	-24.20%	30,272
Bay	31,049	54.42%	25,448	44.60%	562	0.98%	5,601	9.82%	57,059
Benzie	4,383	44.83%	5,284	54.04%	111	1.14%	-901	-9.21%	9,778
Berrien	32,846	43.99%	41,076	55.01%	749	1.00%	-8,230	-11.02%	74,671
Branch	7,004	38.98%	10,784	60.02%	179	1.00%	-3,780	-21.04%	17,967
Calhoun	29,891	47.70%	32,093	51.21%	683	1.09%	-2,202	-3.51%	62,667
Cass	9,537	42.02%	12,964	57.12%	196	0.86%	-3,427	-15.10%	22,697
Charlevoix	5,729	40.52%	8,214	58.09%	196	1.39%	-2,485	-17.57%	14,139
Cheboygan	5,941	42.78%	7,798	56.15%	148	1.07%	-1,857	-13.37%	13,887
Chippewa	7,203	43.69%	9,122	55.33%	163	0.99%	-1,919	-11.64%	16,488
Clare	6,984	49.09%	7,088	49.82%	154	1.08%	-104	-0.73%	14,226
Clinton	15,483	40.95%	21,989	58.16%	335	0.89%	-6,506	-17.21%	37,807
Crawford	3,126	43.21%	4,017	55.52%	92	1.27%	-891	-12.31%	7,235
Delta	9,381	48.76%	9,680	50.32%	177	0.92%	-299	-1.56%	19,238
Dickinson	5,650	41.70%	7,734	57.08%	165	1.22%	-2,084	-15.38%	13,549
Eaton	25,411	45.58%	29,781	53.41%	563	1.01%	-4,370	-7.83%	55,755
Emmet	6,846	39.41%	10,332	59.48%	194	1.12%	-3,486	-20.07%	17,372
Genesee	128,334	60.03%	83,870	39.23%	1,571	0.73%	44,464	20.80%	213,775
Gladwin	6,343	47.95%	6,770	51.18%	114	0.86%	-427	-3.23%	13,227
Gogebic	4,421	52.31%	3,935	46.56%	96	1.14%	486	5.75%	8,452
Grand Traverse	18,256	39.52%	27,446	59.42%	489	1.06%	-9,190	-19.90%	46,191
Gratiot	7,377	42.45%	9,834	56.59%	168	0.97%	-2,457	-14.14%	17,379
Hillsdale	7,123	35.23%	12,804	63.34%	289	1.43%	-5,681	-28.11%	20,216
Houghton	6,731	42.46%	8,889	56.08%	231	1.46%	-2,158	-13.62%	15,851
Huron	7,629	43.68%	9,671	55.37%	166	0.95%	-2,042	-11.69%	17,466
Ingham	76,877	57.78%	54,734	41.14%	1,442	1.08%	22,143	16.64%	133,053
Ionia	10,647	38.55%	16,621	60.18%	350	1.27%	-5,974	-21.63%	27,618
Iosco	6,557	46.82%	7,301	52.13%	148	1.06%	-744	-5.31%	14,006
Iron	3,215	49.38%	3,224	49.52%	72	1.11%	-9	-0.14%	6,511
Isabella	12,334	50.57%	11,754	48.19%	302	1.24%	580	2.38%	24,390
Jackson	31,025	43.21%	40,029	55.75%	741	1.03%	-9,004	-12.54%	71,795
Kalamazoo	61,462	51.31%	57,147	47.71%	1,174	0.98%	4,315	3.60%	119,783
Kalkaska	3,189	38.05%	5,084	60.67%	107	1.28%	-1,895	-22.62%	8,380
Kent	116,909	40.19%	171,201	58.85%	2,781	0.96%	-54,292	-18.66%	290,891
Keweenaw	630	43.78%	781	54.27%	28	1.95%	-151	-10.49%	1,439
Lake	2,675	50.99%	2,503	47.71%	68	1.30%	172	3.28%	5,246
Lapeer	18,086	40.97%	25,556	57.89%	505	1.14%	-7,470	-16.92%	44,147
Leelanau	6,048	43.46%	7,733	55.57%	136	0.98%	-1,685	-12.11%	13,917
Lenawee	20,787	44.22%	25,675	54.61%	550	1.17%	-4,888	-10.39%	47,012
Livingston	33,991	36.26%	58,860	62.79%	891	0.95%	-24,869	-26.53%	93,742
Luce	1,045	36.94%	1,749	61.82%	35	1.24%	-704	-24.88%	2,829
Mackinac	2,819	42.72%	3,706	56.16%	74	1.12%	-887	-13.44%	6,599
Macomb	196,160	48.75%	202,166	50.24%	4,084	1.01%	-6,006	-1.49%	402,410
Manistee	6,272	49.23%	6,295	49.41%	173	1.36%	-23	-0.18%	12,740
Marquette	17,412	53.60%	14,690	45.22%	386	1.19%	2,722	8.38%	32,488
Mason	6,333	43.34%	8,124	55.60%	154	1.05%	-1,791	-12.26%	14,611
Mecosta	7,730	43.97%	9,710	55.23%	141	0.80%	-1,980	-11.26%	17,581
Menominee	5,326	46.64%	5,942	52.04%	151	1.32%	-616	-5.40%	11,419
Midland	18,355	42.41%	24,369	56.31%	551	1.27%	-6,014	-13.90%	43,275
Missaukee	2,319	31.25%	5,055	68.12%	47	0.63%	-2,736	-36.87%	7,421
Monroe	36,089	48.68%	37,470	50.54%	573	0.77%	-1,381	-1.86%	74,132
Montcalm	11,471	42.91%	14,968	55.99%	295	1.10%	-3,497	-13.08%	26,734
Montmorency	2,196	39.48%	3,300	59.32%	67	1.20%	-1,104	-19.84%	5,563
Muskegon	44,282	55.14%	35,302	43.96%	729	0.91%	8,980	11.18%	80,313
Newaygo	9,057	39.60%	13,608	59.49%	208	0.91%	-4,551	-19.89%	22,873
Oakland	319,387	49.75%	316,633	49.32%	5,957	0.93%	2,754	0.43%	641,977
Oceana	5,441	44.25%	6,677	54.30%	179	1.46%	-1,236	-10.05%	12,297
Ogemaw	5,215	48.30%	5,454	50.52%	127	1.18%	-239	-2.22%	10,796
Ontonagon	1,863	44.44%	2,262	53.96%	67	1.60%	-399	-9.52%	4,192
Osceola	4,467	39.93%	6,599	58.98%	122	1.09%	-2,132	-19.05%	11,188
Oscoda	1,792	40.64%	2,570	58.29%	47	1.07%	-778	-17.65%	4,409
Otsego	4,674	37.98%	7,470	60.70%	163	1.32%	-2,796	-22.72%	12,307
Ottawa	35,552	27.64%	92,048	71.55%	1,043	0.81%	-56,496	-43.91%	128,643
Presque Isle	3,432	45.66%	3,982	52.98%	102	1.36%	-550	-7.32%	7,516
Roscommon	6,810	47.43%	7,364	51.28%	185	1.29%	-554	-3.85%	14,359
Saginaw	54,887	53.37%	47,165	45.86%	800	0.78%	7,722	7.51%	102,852
St. Clair	36,174	45.36%	42,740	53.60%	829	1.04%	-6,566	-8.24%	79,743
St. Joseph	9,648	38.23%	15,340	60.78%	251	0.99%	-5,692	-22.55%	25,239
Sanilac	7,883	37.97%	12,632	60.84%	248	1.19%	-4,749	-22.87%	20,763
Schoolcraft	2,137	48.12%	2,267	51.05%	37	0.83%	-130	-2.93%	4,441
Shiawassee	16,881	46.06%	19,407	52.95%	363	0.99%	-2,526	-6.89%	36,651
Tuscola	12,631	44.57%	15,389	54.31%	318	1.12%	-2,758	-9.74%	28,338
Van Buren	16,151	47.26%	17,634	51.60%	389	1.14%	-1,483	-4.34%	34,174
Washtenaw	109,953	63.46%	61,455	35.47%	1,856	1.07%	48,498	27.99%	173,264
Wayne	600,047	69.39%	257,750	29.81%	6,931	0.80%	342,297	39.58%	864,728
Wexford	6,034	39.80%	8,966	59.14%	160	1.06%	-2,932	-19.34%	15,160
Totals	2,479,183	51.23%	2,313,746	47.81%	46,323	0.96%	165,437	3.42%	4,839,252

==== Counties that flipped from Democratic to Republican ====
- Alpena (largest municipality: Alpena)
- Calhoun (largest municipality: Battle Creek)
- Clare (largest municipality: Clare)
- Iosco (largest municipality: East Tawas)
- Iron (largest municipality: Iron River)
- Macomb (largest municipality: Warren)
- Manistee (largest municipality: Manistee)
- Monroe (largest municipality: Monroe)
- Ogemaw (largest municipality: Skidway Lake)
- Roscommon (largest municipality: Houghton Lake)

==== Counties that flipped from Republican to Democratic ====
- Alger (largest municipality: Munising)

=== By congressional district ===
Bush won ten of 15 congressional districts, including one held by a Democrat.

District	Bush	Kerry	Representative
1st	53%	46%	Bart Stupak
2nd	60%	39%	Peter Hoekstra
3rd	59%	40%	Vern Ehlers
4th	55%	44%	Dave Camp
5th	41%	59%	Dale Kildee
6th	53%	46%	Fred Upton
7th	54%	45%	Nick Smith
7th	54%	45%	Joe Schwarz
8th	54%	45%	Mike Rogers
9th	51%	49%	Joe Knollenberg
10th	57%	43%	Candice Miller
11th	53%	47%	Thaddeus McCotter
12th	39%	61%	Sander Levin
13th	19%	81%	Carolyn Cheeks Kilpatrick
14th	17%	83%	John Conyers Jr.
15th	38%	62%	John Dingell

== Electors ==
Technically the voters of Michigan cast their ballots for electors: representatives to the Electoral College. Michigan is allocated 17 electors because it has 15 congressional districts and two senators. All candidates who appear on the ballot or qualify to receive write-in votes must submit a list of 17 electors, who pledge to vote for their candidate and his or her running mate. Whoever wins the majority of votes in the state is awarded all 17 electoral votes. Their chosen electors then vote for president and vice president. Although electors are pledged to their candidate and running mate, they are not obligated to vote for them. An elector who votes for someone other than his or her candidate is known as a faithless elector.

The electors of each state and the District of Columbia met on December 13, 2004, to cast their votes for president and vice president. The Electoral College itself never meets as one body. Instead, the electors from each state and the District of Columbia met in their respective capitols.

The following were the members of the Electoral College from the state. All 17 were pledged for Kerry/Edwards:

1. Carol Vining Moore
2. Margaret Robinson
3. Ida I. DeHaas
4. Marcela L. Ort
5. Vickie Sue Price
6. Paul Todd
7. Leonard Smigielski
8. Bruce McAttee
9. Stanley W. Harris
10. Yvonne Williams
11. Elizabeth D. Tavarozzi
12. Charley Jackson
13. Joan Robinson Cheeks
14. Roger Short
15. Harless Scott
16. Richard Shoemaker
17. Michael Pitt

== See also ==
- Presidency of George W. Bush
- United States presidential elections in Michigan
