= 2000 United States presidential election in Michigan =

- November 7, 2000
- Turnout: 58.2% ▲

Nominee	Al Gore	George W. Bush
Party	Democratic	Republican
Home state	Tennessee	Texas
Running mate	Joe Lieberman	Dick Cheney
Electoral vote	18	0
Popular vote	2,170,418	1,953,139
Percentage	51.28%	46.14%

Gore
40–50%
50–60%
60–70%
70–80%
80–90%
90–100%
Bush
40–50%
50–60%
60–70%
70–80%
80–90%
Tie
President before election
Bill Clinton
Democratic
Elected President
George W. Bush
Republican

The 2000 United States presidential election in Michigan took place on November 7, 2000, and was part of the 2000 United States presidential election. Voters chose 18 representatives, or electors to the Electoral College, who voted for president and vice president.

Vice President Al Gore won Michigan by a margin of 5.1%. The western part of the state, which is more rural, voted overwhelmingly Republican, and George W. Bush won most of the congressional districts and counties in that region of the state. His best performance was in Ottawa County, where he won with over 70%. Gore did fairly well in the eastern region of the state. His best performance was in Wayne County, the highest-populated county in the state and home of the city of Detroit. He won the county with 69%, with his second-best performance in Genesee County, where he got over 62% of the vote.

This election marked the first time since 1976 in which Michigan's electoral votes did not go to the winner of the general election, although the state was carried by the candidate who ultimately won the popular vote.

Bush became the first-ever Republican to win the White House without carrying Kalamazoo or Muskegon County, as well as the first to do so without carrying Alpena or Oakland County since Benjamin Harrison in 1888, the first to do so without carrying Ingham County since William McKinley in 1896, and the first Republican since Richard Nixon in 1968 to win the White House without carrying Michigan. Michigan was also the only state in the Midwest besides Illinois where Gore won by a majority of votes. As such, this marked the first election in which a losing Democrat won a majority in the state.

In the Detroit suburbs, Gore won both Oakland and Macomb Counties. The last time the two counties backed different candidates was in 1968. However, the election marked the last time the more blue-collar Macomb County voted to the left of the more white-collar Oakland County.

Michigan was one of ten states that backed George H. W. Bush, Bush's father, for president in 1988 that did not back Bush in either 2000 or 2004.

== Primary elections ==
Michigan held presidential primary elections on February 22, 2000.

=== Democratic party ===
Michigan's delegates were awarded by a party caucus on March 11, 2000. The primary was therefore non-binding.

==== Results ====
Democratic primary results
Party	Candidate	Votes	%
Democratic	Lyndon LaRouche	13,195	29.41%
Democratic	Uncommitted	31,665	70.59%
Total votes		44,860	100.00%

=== Republican party ===
Unlike the Democratic party's primary, the Republican primary did award delegates.

==== Results ====
Republican primary results
Party	Candidate	Votes	%
Republican	John McCain	650,805	50.97%
Republican	George W. Bush	549,665	43.05%
Republican	Alan Keyes	59,032	4.62%
Republican	Steve Forbes	4,894	0.38%
Republican	Gary Bauer	2,733	0.21%
Republican	Orrin Hatch	905	0.07%
Republican	Joe Schriner (write-in)	22	0.00%
Republican	Uncommitted	8,714	0.68%
Total votes		1,276,670	100.00%

=== Reform party ===
==== Results ====
Reform primary results
Party	Candidate	Votes	%
Reform	Donald Trump	2,164	69.53%
Reform	Uncommitted	948	30.46%
Total votes		3.112	100.00%

== General election ==
=== Polling ===
Poll source	Date(s)	Sample size	Margin of error	George W. Bush (R)	Al Gore (D)	Ralph Nader (G)	Other / undecided (Note: Calculated by taking the difference of 100% and all other listed candidates combined. For polls that do not report a figure for Nader, this includes his support.)
Zogby Analytics	November 5, 2000	593	—	45%	51%	4%	0%
Rasmussen Reports	November 4, 2000	787	—	45%	44%	—	11%
SurveyUSA	November 4, 2000	600	—	48%	46%	4%	2%
Harris Insights & Analytics	November 3, 2000	8,757	—	45%	50%	3%	2%
EPIC-MRA	November 2, 2000	500	—	44%	45%	—	11%
Zogby Analytics	November 2, 2000	600	—	40%	49%	5%	6%
Mitchell Research & Communications	November 1, 2000	800	—	41%	46%	3%	10%
Research 2000	November 1, 2000	602	—	41%	46%	4%	9%
American Research Group	October 31, 2000	600	—	44%	48%	3%	5%
Zogby Analytics	October 30, 2000	600	—	41%	50%	3%	6%
Rasmussen Reports	October 29, 2000	956	—	43%	43%	—	14%
SurveyUSA	October 29, 2000	600	—	45%	49%	—	6%
Los Angeles Times	October 28, 2000	401	—	44%	48%	3%	5%
Zogby Analytics	October 27, 2000	603	—	45%	46%	3%	6%
Opinion Dynamics	October 26, 2000	600	—	40%	43%	4%	13%
Marketing Resource Group (MRG)	October 25, 2000	500	—	45%	39%	5%	11%
EPIC-MRA	October 24, 2000	600	—	44%	42%	3%	11%
Lake Research Partners/The Tarrance Group	October 24, 2000	400	—	42%	43%	5%	10%
Mitchell Research & Communications	October 24, 2000	600	—	42%	42%	3%	13%
Hill Research Consultants (R) (Note: Poll conducted for an unspecified Republican sponsor.)	October 23, 2000	550	—	42%	41%	—	17%
American Research Group	October 22, 2000	600	—	43%	46%	4%	7%
SurveyUSA	October 22, 2000	600	—	46%	47%	—	7%
EPIC-MRA	October 18, 2000	600	—	43%	43%	4%	10%
Rasmussen Reports	October 18, 2000	626	—	43%	43%	—	14%

=== Results ===
2000 United States presidential election in Michigan
Party	Candidate	Votes	%
Democratic	Al Gore	2,170,418	51.28%
Republican	George W. Bush	1,953,139	46.15%
Green	Ralph Nader	84,165	1.99%
Libertarian	Harry Browne	16,711	0.39%
U. S. Taxpayers'	Howard Phillips	3,791	0.09%
Natural Law	John Hagelin	2,426	0.06%
Independent	Pat Buchanan (write-in)	1,851	0.04%
Total votes		4,232,501	100.00%

==== Results by county ====
County	Al Gore Democratic		George W. Bush Republican		Various candidates Other parties		Margin		Total votes cast
County	#	%	#	%	#	%	#	%	Total votes cast
Alcona	2,696	44.96%	3,152	52.56%	149	2.48%	-456	-7.60%	5,997
Alger	2,071	47.43%	2,142	49.06%	153	3.50%	-71	-1.63%	4,366
Allegan	15,495	34.52%	28,197	62.81%	1,199	2.67%	-12,702	-28.29%	44,891
Alpena	7,053	49.91%	6,769	47.90%	310	2.19%	284	2.01%	14,132
Antrim	4,329	37.62%	6,780	58.92%	398	3.46%	-2,451	-21.30%	11,507
Arenac	3,685	50.71%	3,421	47.08%	161	2.22%	264	3.63%	7,267
Baraga	1,400	41.26%	1,836	54.11%	157	4.63%	-436	-12.85%	3,393
Barry	9,769	37.22%	15,716	59.88%	759	2.89%	-5,947	-22.66%	26,244
Bay	28,251	54.71%	22,150	42.90%	1,235	2.39%	6,101	11.81%	51,636
Benzie	3,546	43.93%	4,172	51.68%	354	4.39%	-626	-7.75%	8,072
Berrien	28,152	43.15%	35,689	54.70%	1,400	2.15%	-7,537	-11.55%	65,241
Branch	6,691	42.39%	8,743	55.40%	349	2.21%	-2,052	-13.01%	15,783
Calhoun	27,312	49.59%	26,291	47.73%	1,477	2.68%	1,021	1.86%	55,080
Cass	8,808	44.43%	10,545	53.19%	472	2.38%	-1,737	-8.76%	19,825
Charlevoix	4,958	39.71%	7,018	56.20%	511	4.09%	-2,060	-16.49%	12,487
Cheboygan	5,484	43.47%	6,815	54.01%	318	2.52%	-1,331	-10.54%	12,617
Chippewa	6,370	44.38%	7,526	52.43%	458	3.19%	-1,156	-8.05%	14,354
Clare	6,287	49.87%	5,937	47.09%	383	3.04%	350	2.78%	12,607
Clinton	13,394	41.60%	18,054	56.07%	751	2.33%	-4,660	-14.47%	32,199
Crawford	2,790	43.84%	3,345	52.56%	229	3.60%	-555	-8.72%	6,364
Delta	7,970	46.03%	8,871	51.23%	475	2.74%	-901	-5.20%	17,316
Dickinson	5,533	43.12%	6,932	54.02%	367	2.86%	-1,399	-10.90%	12,832
Eaton	23,211	47.11%	24,803	50.34%	1,258	2.55%	-1,592	-3.23%	49,272
Emmet	5,451	37.05%	8,602	58.47%	658	4.47%	-3,151	-21.42%	14,711
Genesee	119,833	62.78%	66,641	34.92%	4,391	2.30%	53,192	27.86%	190,865
Gladwin	5,573	47.92%	5,743	49.39%	313	2.69%	-170	-1.47%	11,629
Gogebic	4,066	48.76%	3,929	47.12%	344	4.13%	137	1.64%	8,339
Grand Traverse	14,371	37.59%	22,358	58.48%	1,500	3.92%	-7,987	-20.89%	38,229
Gratiot	6,538	43.07%	8,312	54.76%	329	2.17%	-1,774	-11.69%	15,179
Hillsdale	6,495	37.17%	10,483	60.00%	495	2.83%	-3,988	-22.83%	17,473
Houghton	5,688	40.01%	7,895	55.54%	633	4.45%	-2,207	-15.53%	14,216
Huron	6,899	42.86%	8,911	55.37%	285	1.77%	-2,012	-12.51%	16,095
Ingham	69,231	57.41%	47,314	39.23%	4,050	3.36%	21,917	18.18%	120,595
Ionia	9,481	39.55%	13,915	58.05%	574	2.39%	-4,434	-18.50%	23,970
Iosco	6,505	49.20%	6,345	47.99%	372	2.81%	160	1.21%	13,222
Iron	3,014	48.71%	2,967	47.95%	207	3.35%	47	0.76%	6,188
Isabella	10,228	48.55%	10,053	47.71%	788	3.74%	175	0.84%	21,069
Jackson	28,160	45.46%	32,066	51.76%	1,720	2.78%	-3,906	-6.30%	61,946
Kalamazoo	48,807	48.49%	48,254	47.94%	3,595	3.57%	553	0.55%	100,656
Kalkaska	2,774	40.50%	3,842	56.10%	233	3.40%	-1,068	-15.60%	6,849
Kent	95,442	38.13%	148,602	59.37%	6,274	2.51%	-53,160	-21.24%	250,318
Keweenaw	540	40.21%	740	55.10%	63	4.69%	-200	-14.89%	1,343
Lake	2,584	55.06%	1,961	41.79%	148	3.15%	623	13.27%	4,693
Lapeer	15,749	42.30%	20,351	54.66%	1,134	3.05%	-4,602	-12.36%	37,234
Leelanau	4,635	38.60%	6,840	56.96%	534	4.45%	-2,205	-18.36%	12,009
Lenawee	18,365	45.81%	20,681	51.58%	1,047	2.61%	-2,316	-5.77%	40,093
Livingston	28,780	38.13%	44,637	59.14%	2,058	2.73%	-15,857	-21.01%	75,475
Luce	956	37.70%	1,480	58.36%	100	3.94%	-524	-20.66%	2,536
Mackinac	2,533	42.43%	3,272	54.81%	165	2.76%	-739	-12.38%	5,970
Macomb	172,625	49.96%	164,265	47.54%	8,669	2.51%	8,360	2.42%	345,559
Manistee	5,639	49.34%	5,401	47.26%	388	3.40%	238	2.08%	11,428
Marquette	15,503	53.13%	12,577	43.10%	1,099	3.77%	2,926	10.03%	29,179
Mason	5,579	42.86%	7,066	54.29%	371	2.85%	-1,487	-11.43%	13,016
Mecosta	6,300	42.70%	8,072	54.71%	382	2.59%	-1,772	-12.01%	14,754
Menominee	4,597	44.06%	5,529	52.99%	308	2.95%	-932	-8.93%	10,434
Midland	15,959	41.04%	21,887	56.28%	1,042	2.68%	-5,928	-15.24%	38,888
Missaukee	2,062	31.74%	4,274	65.79%	160	2.46%	-2,212	-34.05%	6,496
Monroe	31,555	51.06%	28,940	46.83%	1,300	2.10%	2,615	4.23%	61,795
Montcalm	9,627	42.03%	12,696	55.43%	581	2.54%	-3,069	-13.40%	22,904
Montmorency	2,139	42.70%	2,750	54.90%	120	2.40%	-611	-12.20%	5,009
Muskegon	37,865	54.66%	30,028	43.35%	1,377	1.99%	7,837	11.31%	69,270
Newaygo	7,677	39.25%	11,399	58.29%	481	2.46%	-3,722	-19.04%	19,557
Oakland	281,201	49.31%	274,319	48.10%	14,745	2.59%	6,882	1.21%	570,265
Oceana	4,597	42.68%	5,913	54.89%	262	2.43%	-1,316	-12.21%	10,772
Ogemaw	4,896	49.68%	4,706	47.75%	253	2.57%	190	1.93%	9,855
Ontonagon	1,514	36.47%	2,472	59.55%	165	3.97%	-958	-23.08%	4,151
Osceola	4,006	40.34%	5,680	57.20%	244	2.46%	-1,674	-16.86%	9,930
Oscoda	1,677	42.01%	2,207	55.29%	108	2.71%	-530	-13.28%	3,992
Otsego	4,034	38.40%	6,108	58.14%	363	3.46%	-2,074	-19.74%	10,505
Ottawa	29,600	26.76%	78,703	71.16%	2,296	2.08%	-49,103	-44.40%	110,599
Presque Isle	3,242	45.79%	3,660	51.69%	178	2.51%	-418	-5.90%	7,080
Roscommon	6,433	49.76%	6,190	47.88%	305	2.36%	243	1.88%	12,928
Saginaw	50,825	54.21%	41,152	43.89%	1,779	1.90%	9,673	10.32%	93,756
St. Clair	33,002	48.17%	33,571	49.00%	1,943	2.84%	-569	-0.83%	68,516
St. Joseph	8,574	38.93%	12,906	58.60%	544	2.47%	-4,332	-19.67%	22,024
Sanilac	7,153	38.53%	10,966	59.06%	447	2.41%	-3,813	-20.53%	18,566
Schoolcraft	2,036	48.50%	2,088	49.74%	74	1.76%	-52	-1.24%	4,198
Shiawassee	15,520	48.17%	15,816	49.09%	882	2.74%	-296	-0.92%	32,218
Tuscola	10,845	43.99%	13,213	53.60%	594	2.41%	-2,368	-9.61%	24,652
Van Buren	13,796	46.79%	14,792	50.17%	894	3.03%	-996	-3.38%	29,482
Washtenaw	86,647	59.78%	52,459	36.19%	5,834	4.03%	34,188	23.59%	144,940
Wayne	530,414	69.01%	223,021	29.02%	15,192	1.98%	307,393	39.99%	768,627
Wexford	5,326	41.03%	7,215	55.58%	441	3.40%	-1,889	-14.55%	12,982
Totals	2,170,418	51.28%	1,953,139	46.14%	109,154	2.58%	217,279	5.14%	4,232,711

===== Counties that flipped from Democratic to Republican =====
- Alcona (Largest city: Harrisville)
- Alger (Largest city: Munising)
- Baraga (Largest city: Baraga)
- Benzie (Largest city: Frankfort)
- Branch (Largest city: Coldwater)
- Cass (Largest city: Dowagiac)
- Cheboygan (Largest city: Cheboygan)
- Chippewa (Largest city: Sault Ste. Marie)
- Crawford (Largest city: Grayling)
- Delta (Largest city: Escanaba)
- Dickinson (Largest city: Iron Mountain)
- Gladwin (Largest city: Gladwin)
- Gratiot (Largest city: Alma)
- Houghton (Largest city: Houghton)
- Huron (Largest city: Bad Axe)
- Kalkaska (Largest city: Kalkaska)
- Keweenaw (Largest city: Ahmeek)
- Lapeer (Largest city: Lapeer)
- Lenawee (Largest city: Adrian)
- Luce (Largest city: Newberry)
- Mackinac (Largest city: St. Ignace)
- Mason (Largest city: Ludington)
- Mecosta (Largest city: Big Rapids)
- Menominee (Largest city: Menominee)
- Montcalm (Largest city: Greenville)
- Montmorency (Largest city: Lewiston)
- Oceana (Largest city: Hart)
- Ontonagon (Largest city: Ontonagon)
- Osceola (Largest city: Reed City)
- Oscoda (Largest city: Mio)
- Presque Isle (Largest city: Rogers City)
- Schoolcraft (Largest city: Manistique)
- Shiawassee (Largest city: Owosso)
- St. Clair (Largest city: Port Huron)
- Tuscola (Largest city: Caro)
- Van Buren (Largest city: South Haven)
- Wexford (Largest city: Cadillac)

==== By congressional district ====
Gore won nine of 16 congressional districts. Each candidate won two districts that elected representatives of the other party.

District	Gore	Bush	Representative
1st	43%	53%	Bart Stupak
2nd	38%	59%	Peter Hoekstra
3rd	38%	59%	Vern Ehlers
4th	45%	53%	Dave Camp
5th	53%	45%	James A. Barcia
6th	46%	52%	Fred Upton
7th	46%	51%	Nick Smith
8th	50%	47%	Debbie Stabenow
8th	50%	47%	Mike Rogers
9th	52%	45%	Dale Kildee
10th	48%	49%	David Bonior
11th	49.0%	48.6%	Joe Knollenberg
12th	54%	43%	Sander Levin
13th	58%	38%	Lynn N. Rivers
14th	88%	11%	John Conyers Jr.
15th	87%	12%	Carolyn Cheeks Kilpatrick
16th	54%	44%	John Dingell

== Electors ==
Technically the voters of Michigan cast their ballots for electors: representatives to the Electoral College. For this election, Michigan was allocated 18 electors because it had 16 congressional districts and 2 senators. All candidates who appear on the ballot or qualify to receive write-in votes must submit a list of 18 electors, who pledge to vote for their candidate and his or her running mate. Whoever wins the majority of votes in the state is awarded all 18 electoral votes. Their chosen electors then vote for president and vice president. Although electors are pledged to their candidate and running mate, they are not obligated to vote for them. An elector who votes for someone other than his or her candidate is known as a faithless elector.

The electors of each state and the District of Columbia met on December 18, 2000 to cast their votes for president and vice president. The Electoral College itself never meets as one body. Instead the electors from each state and the District of Columbia met in their respective capitols.

The following were the members of the Electoral College from the state. All were pledged to and voted for Gore and Lieberman:

- Lana Boldi
- John Cherry
- Patty Fedewa
- Sigrid L. Grace
- Dona Jean Graham
- Freman Hendrix
- Jeff Jenks
- John Kelly
- Don Oetman
- Ken Oke
- Charles Prather
- Jim Ramey
- Iris K. Salters
- Judith L. Strong
- David P. Taylor
- Juli Trudell
- Mary Warner
- Marie Weigold

== See also ==
- Presidency of George W. Bush
- United States presidential elections in Michigan
