= 1972 United States presidential election in Michigan =

- November 7, 1972

All 21 Michigan votes to the Electoral College
- Turnout: 59.4% ▼

Nominee	Richard Nixon	George McGovern
Party	Republican	Democratic
Home state	California	South Dakota
Running mate	Spiro Agnew	Sargent Shriver
Electoral vote	21	0
Popular vote	1,961,721	1,459,435
Percentage	56.20%	41.81%
County results
Nixon
40–50%
50–60%
60–70%
70–80%
McGovern
40–50%
50–60%
President before election
Richard Nixon
Republican
Elected President
Richard Nixon
Republican

The 1972 United States presidential election in Michigan took place on November 7, 1972, as part of the 1972 United States presidential election. Voters chose 21 representatives, or electors, to the Electoral College, who voted for president and vice president.

Michigan was won by incumbent President Richard Nixon (R–California), with 56.20% of the popular vote, against George McGovern (D–South Dakota), with 41.81% of the popular vote—a victory margin of 14.4%. John G. Schmitz was the only other candidate on the ballot, and, as the candidate for the American Independent Party, he received over 63,000 votes. Despite voting for a Republican presidential candidate for the first time since 1956, this result nonetheless made Michigan 8.8% more Democratic than the nation at large.

Nixon's victory was the first of five consecutive Republican victories in the state, as Michigan would not vote for a Democratic candidate again until Bill Clinton’s 1992 victory. The state leaned Democratic for the following 20 years, before evolving into a true swing state in 2016.

Delta, Lake, Washtenaw, and Wayne Counties were the only four of Michigan's 83 counties to vote for McGovern. Washtenaw was one of only six counties outside South Dakota (McGovern's home state) to vote for McGovern after voting for Richard Nixon in 1968. Nixon became the first Republican to win the White House without carrying Washtenaw since Benjamin Harrison in 1888. Gogebic County would not vote Republican again until 2016. As of the 2024 presidential election, this is the last time Wayne County was decided by a single-digit margin. It is also the last election in which Michigan voted to the left of New York.

== Results ==
1972 United States presidential election in Michigan
Party	Candidate	Votes	%
Republican	Richard Nixon (inc.)	1,961,721	56.20%
Democratic	George McGovern	1,459,435	41.81%
American Independent	John G. Schmitz	63,321	1.81%
Socialist Labor	Louis Fisher	2,437	0.07%
Socialist Workers	Linda Jenness	1,603	0.05%
Communist	Gus Hall	1,210	0.03%
Write-in	Scattering	598	0.02%
Total votes		3,490,325	100.00%

=== Results by county ===
County	Richard Nixon Republican		George McGovern Democratic		John G. Schmitz American Independent		All Others Various		Margin		Total votes cast
County	#	%	#	%	#	%	#	%	#	%	Total votes cast
Alcona	2,434	65.91%	1,195	32.36%	63	1.71%	1	0.03%	1,239	33.55%	3,693
Alger	2,035	52.48%	1,803	46.49%	35	0.90%	5	0.13%	232	5.99%	3,878
Allegan	18,407	68.47%	7,883	29.32%	554	2.06%	40	0.15%	10,524	39.15%	26,884
Alpena	6,513	55.05%	5,104	43.14%	204	1.72%	10	0.08%	1,409	11.91%	11,831
Antrim	4,068	64.77%	2,000	31.84%	200	3.18%	13	0.21%	2,068	32.93%	6,281
Arenac	2,588	57.43%	1,829	40.59%	85	1.89%	4	0.09%	759	16.84%	4,506
Baraga	1,905	54.93%	1,517	43.74%	38	1.10%	8	0.23%	388	11.19%	3,468
Barry	10,393	64.02%	5,484	33.78%	340	2.09%	16	0.10%	4,909	30.24%	16,233
Bay	23,094	50.08%	21,712	47.08%	1,254	2.72%	58	0.13%	1,382	3.00%	46,118
Benzie	2,686	66.26%	1,310	32.31%	55	1.36%	3	0.07%	1,376	33.95%	4,054
Berrien	43,047	68.26%	18,597	29.49%	1,333	2.11%	83	0.13%	24,450	38.77%	63,060
Branch	8,388	62.01%	4,887	36.13%	215	1.59%	36	0.27%	3,501	25.88%	13,526
Calhoun	32,531	58.27%	22,154	39.68%	1,002	1.79%	141	0.25%	10,377	18.59%	55,828
Cass	10,398	66.31%	4,982	31.77%	286	1.82%	15	0.10%	5,416	34.54%	15,681
Charlevoix	4,522	59.04%	2,831	36.96%	301	3.93%	5	0.07%	1,691	22.08%	7,659
Cheboygan	4,529	59.11%	2,985	38.96%	142	1.85%	6	0.08%	1,544	20.15%	7,662
Chippewa	7,028	59.03%	4,744	39.85%	132	1.11%	2	0.02%	2,284	19.18%	11,906
Clare	4,402	62.99%	2,434	34.83%	144	2.06%	8	0.11%	1,968	28.16%	6,988
Clinton	13,438	68.38%	5,870	29.87%	322	1.64%	23	0.12%	7,568	38.51%	19,653
Crawford	1,953	61.98%	1,143	36.27%	50	1.59%	5	0.16%	810	25.71%	3,151
Delta	7,647	48.14%	8,003	50.38%	220	1.38%	16	0.10%	-356	-2.24%	15,886
Dickinson	5,989	51.12%	5,339	45.57%	378	3.23%	9	0.08%	650	5.55%	11,715
Eaton	20,413	68.47%	8,986	30.14%	386	1.29%	26	0.09%	11,427	38.33%	29,811
Emmet	5,288	61.91%	3,081	36.07%	163	1.91%	9	0.11%	2,207	25.84%	8,541
Genesee	85,747	52.78%	73,896	45.49%	2,602	1.60%	204	0.13%	11,851	7.29%	162,449
Gladwin	3,484	61.94%	2,016	35.84%	123	2.19%	2	0.04%	1,468	26.10%	5,625
Gogebic	5,631	52.26%	4,984	46.25%	151	1.40%	10	0.09%	647	6.01%	10,776
Grand Traverse	11,421	64.81%	5,810	32.97%	372	2.11%	18	0.10%	5,611	31.84%	17,621
Gratiot	9,904	68.41%	4,370	30.18%	184	1.27%	20	0.14%	5,534	38.23%	14,478
Hillsdale	9,261	68.64%	3,942	29.22%	276	2.05%	13	0.10%	5,319	39.42%	13,492
Houghton	9,053	58.07%	6,402	41.06%	131	0.84%	4	0.03%	2,651	17.01%	15,590
Huron	9,832	67.36%	4,456	30.53%	292	2.00%	16	0.11%	5,376	36.83%	14,596
Ingham	63,376	53.60%	53,458	45.21%	1,079	0.91%	330	0.28%	9,918	8.39%	118,243
Ionia	10,898	62.57%	6,240	35.83%	255	1.46%	23	0.13%	4,658	26.74%	17,416
Iosco	5,750	64.10%	3,065	34.17%	150	1.67%	6	0.07%	2,685	29.93%	8,971
Iron	3,630	49.21%	3,512	47.61%	229	3.10%	5	0.07%	118	1.60%	7,376
Isabella	9,682	55.47%	7,446	42.66%	248	1.42%	78	0.45%	2,236	12.81%	17,454
Jackson	34,220	62.33%	19,350	35.24%	1,254	2.28%	79	0.14%	14,870	27.09%	54,903
Kalamazoo	50,405	58.77%	33,324	38.85%	1,819	2.12%	222	0.26%	17,081	19.92%	85,770
Kalkaska	1,855	64.39%	924	32.07%	100	3.47%	2	0.07%	931	32.32%	2,881
Kent	104,041	59.30%	67,587	38.52%	3,563	2.03%	270	0.15%	36,454	20.78%	175,461
Keweenaw	715	60.49%	456	38.58%	9	0.76%	2	0.17%	259	21.91%	1,182
Lake	1,532	48.93%	1,548	49.44%	47	1.50%	4	0.13%	-16	-0.51%	3,131
Lapeer	11,615	66.02%	5,531	31.44%	421	2.39%	25	0.14%	6,084	34.58%	17,592
Leelanau	3,809	65.82%	1,855	32.05%	118	2.04%	5	0.09%	1,954	33.77%	5,787
Lenawee	19,125	62.39%	11,018	35.94%	473	1.54%	38	0.12%	8,107	26.45%	30,654
Livingston	16,856	66.85%	7,634	30.28%	694	2.75%	31	0.12%	9,222	36.57%	25,215
Luce	1,579	63.49%	862	34.66%	46	1.85%	0	0.00%	717	28.83%	2,487
Mackinac	3,096	60.66%	1,937	37.95%	64	1.25%	7	0.14%	1,159	22.71%	5,104
Macomb	147,777	62.67%	82,346	34.92%	5,286	2.24%	384	0.16%	65,431	27.75%	235,793
Manistee	5,070	57.20%	3,625	40.90%	160	1.81%	8	0.09%	1,445	16.30%	8,863
Marquette	13,249	52.67%	11,555	45.93%	329	1.31%	24	0.10%	1,694	6.74%	25,157
Mason	6,811	63.57%	3,697	34.50%	173	1.61%	34	0.32%	3,114	29.07%	10,715
Mecosta	7,158	64.29%	3,799	34.12%	157	1.41%	20	0.18%	3,359	30.17%	11,134
Menominee	6,060	55.19%	4,657	42.41%	260	2.37%	4	0.04%	1,403	12.78%	10,981
Midland	16,473	61.38%	9,504	35.42%	809	3.01%	50	0.19%	6,969	25.96%	26,836
Missaukee	2,647	71.79%	924	25.06%	110	2.98%	6	0.16%	1,723	46.73%	3,687
Monroe	23,263	54.76%	17,726	41.73%	1,431	3.37%	59	0.14%	5,537	13.03%	42,479
Montcalm	9,591	61.97%	5,602	36.19%	270	1.74%	15	0.10%	3,989	25.78%	15,478
Montmorency	1,798	64.49%	914	32.78%	74	2.65%	2	0.07%	884	31.71%	2,788
Muskegon	36,428	59.60%	22,804	37.31%	1,756	2.87%	137	0.22%	13,624	22.29%	61,125
Newaygo	8,245	65.62%	3,978	31.66%	324	2.58%	18	0.14%	4,267	33.96%	12,565
Oakland	241,613	63.78%	129,400	34.16%	7,088	1.87%	750	0.20%	112,213	29.62%	378,851
Oceana	4,992	64.20%	2,525	32.47%	253	3.25%	6	0.08%	2,467	31.73%	7,776
Ogemaw	3,367	60.77%	2,056	37.11%	112	2.02%	6	0.11%	1,311	23.66%	5,541
Ontonagon	3,040	57.51%	2,140	40.48%	105	1.99%	1	0.02%	900	17.03%	5,286
Osceola	4,441	69.95%	1,706	26.87%	184	2.90%	18	0.28%	2,735	43.08%	6,349
Oscoda	1,561	67.61%	678	29.36%	67	2.90%	3	0.13%	883	38.25%	2,309
Otsego	2,854	58.93%	1,912	39.48%	69	1.42%	8	0.17%	942	19.45%	4,843
Ottawa	42,169	71.99%	15,119	25.81%	1,201	2.05%	87	0.15%	27,050	46.18%	58,576
Presque Isle	3,372	56.23%	2,440	40.69%	184	3.07%	1	0.02%	932	15.54%	5,997
Roscommon	4,136	64.17%	2,187	33.93%	114	1.77%	8	0.12%	1,949	30.24%	6,445
Saginaw	47,920	61.03%	29,424	37.47%	1,068	1.36%	109	0.14%	18,496	23.56%	78,521
Sanilac	11,031	72.93%	3,780	24.99%	302	2.00%	12	0.08%	7,251	47.94%	15,125
Schoolcraft	2,310	56.01%	1,759	42.65%	53	1.29%	2	0.05%	551	13.36%	4,124
Shiawassee	15,489	61.62%	8,932	35.53%	689	2.74%	26	0.10%	6,557	26.09%	25,136
St. Clair	28,471	63.05%	15,712	34.79%	925	2.05%	51	0.11%	12,759	28.26%	45,159
St. Joseph	12,438	69.15%	5,119	28.46%	418	2.32%	13	0.07%	7,319	40.69%	17,988
Tuscola	12,198	67.96%	5,449	30.36%	280	1.56%	22	0.12%	6,749	37.60%	17,949
Van Buren	13,903	64.57%	7,159	33.25%	428	1.99%	41	0.19%	6,744	31.32%	21,531
Washtenaw	50,535	46.98%	55,350	51.45%	1,517	1.41%	173	0.16%	-4,815	-4.47%	107,575
Wayne	435,877	45.08%	514,913	53.26%	14,294	1.48%	1,793	0.19%	-79,036	-8.18%	966,877
Wexford	5,221	61.43%	3,048	35.86%	229	2.69%	1	0.01%	2,173	25.57%	8,499
Totals	1,961,721	56.20%	1,459,435	41.81%	63,321	1.81%	5,848	0.17%	502,286	14.39%	3,490,325

==== Counties that flipped from Democratic to Republican ====
- Alger
- Baraga
- Bay
- Dickinson
- Genesee
- Gogebic
- Houghton
- Iron
- Keweenaw
- Macomb
- Marquette
- Menominee
- Monroe
- Ontonagon
- Schoolcraft

==== Counties that flipped from Republican to Democratic ====
- Washtenaw

== See also ==
- United States presidential elections in Michigan
