= 1940 United States presidential election in Pennsylvania =

- November 5, 1940

Nominee	Franklin D. Roosevelt	Wendell Willkie
Party	Democratic	Republican
Home state	New York	New York
Running mate	Henry A. Wallace	Charles L. McNary
Electoral vote	36	0
Popular vote	2,171,035	1,889,848
Percentage	53.23%	46.33%
County results
Roosevelt
50–60%
60–70%
Willkie
40–50%
50–60%
60–70%
70–80%
President before election
Franklin D. Roosevelt
Democratic
Elected President
Franklin D. Roosevelt
Democratic

The 1940 United States presidential election in Pennsylvania took place on November 5, 1940, as part of the 1940 United States presidential election. Voters chose 36 representatives, or electors to the Electoral College, who voted for president and vice president.

Pennsylvania voted to give Democratic nominee, President Franklin D. Roosevelt an unprecedented third term, over the Republican nominee, corporate lawyer Wendell Willkie, a dark horse candidate who had never before run for a political office. Roosevelt won Pennsylvania by a margin of 6.9%. This is also one of only four occasions where Pennsylvania and Michigan voted for different presidential candidates ever since the Democrats and Republicans became the two major parties in U.S. politics. (Note: The other times were in 1856, 1932, and 1976.)

== Results ==
1940 United States presidential election in Pennsylvania
Party	Candidate	Votes	Percentage	Electoral votes
Democratic	Franklin D. Roosevelt (incumbent)	2,171,035	53.23%	36
Republican	Wendell Willkie	1,889,848	46.33%	0
Socialist	Norman Thomas	10,967	0.27%	0
Communist	Earl Browder	4,519	0.11%	0
Industrial Government	John Aiken	1,518	0.04%	0
Write-ins	Write-ins	827	0.02%	0
Totals		4,078,714	100.00%	36

=== Results by county ===
County	Franklin D. Roosevelt Democratic		Wendell Willkie Republican		Various candidates Other parties		Margin		Total votes cast
County	#	%	#	%	#	%	#	%	Total votes cast
Adams	7,354	46.01%	8,609	53.86%	20	0.13%	-1,255	-7.85%	15,983
Allegheny	367,926	58.03%	263,285	41.52%	2,849	0.45%	104,641	16.50%	634,060
Armstrong	12,144	45.44%	14,524	54.34%	60	0.22%	-2,380	-8.90%	26,728
Beaver	33,609	57.78%	24,324	41.81%	239	0.41%	9,285	15.96%	58,172
Bedford	7,388	45.32%	8,864	54.38%	49	0.30%	-1,476	-9.05%	16,301
Berks	53,301	61.31%	32,111	36.94%	1,522	1.75%	21,190	24.37%	86,934
Blair	21,573	44.65%	26,639	55.13%	106	0.22%	-5,066	-10.48%	48,318
Bradford	6,605	30.75%	14,826	69.02%	49	0.23%	-8,221	-38.27%	21,480
Bucks	20,586	44.78%	25,169	54.75%	212	0.46%	-4,583	-9.97%	45,967
Butler	13,875	41.52%	19,450	58.20%	96	0.29%	-5,575	-16.68%	33,421
Cambria	42,894	58.44%	30,306	41.29%	193	0.26%	12,588	17.15%	73,393
Cameron	1,450	44.60%	1,793	55.15%	8	0.25%	-343	-10.55%	3,251
Carbon	12,777	54.50%	10,618	45.29%	51	0.22%	2,159	9.21%	23,446
Centre	9,869	47.90%	10,665	51.77%	68	0.33%	-796	-3.86%	20,602
Chester	22,473	44.18%	28,222	55.48%	174	0.34%	-5,749	-11.30%	50,869
Clarion	6,564	41.99%	9,035	57.79%	34	0.22%	-2,471	-15.81%	15,633
Clearfield	17,705	53.23%	15,407	46.32%	148	0.44%	2,298	6.91%	33,260
Clinton	7,419	54.03%	6,291	45.81%	22	0.16%	1,128	8.21%	13,732
Columbia	12,523	56.76%	9,518	43.14%	21	0.10%	3,005	13.62%	22,062
Crawford	10,197	38.92%	15,891	60.65%	115	0.44%	-5,694	-21.73%	26,203
Cumberland	15,758	50.64%	15,297	49.16%	61	0.20%	461	1.48%	31,116
Dauphin	38,305	47.30%	42,394	52.35%	276	0.34%	-4,089	-5.05%	80,975
Delaware	60,225	42.74%	80,158	56.88%	534	0.38%	-19,933	-14.15%	140,917
Elk	6,920	49.78%	6,949	49.99%	31	0.22%	-29	-0.21%	13,900
Erie	31,735	46.19%	36,608	53.29%	355	0.52%	-4,873	-7.09%	68,698
Fayette	41,960	63.47%	23,908	36.16%	246	0.37%	18,052	27.30%	66,114
Forest	919	33.59%	1,811	66.19%	6	0.22%	-892	-32.60%	2,736
Franklin	12,713	49.21%	13,084	50.64%	39	0.15%	-371	-1.44%	25,836
Fulton	1,982	48.40%	2,108	51.48%	5	0.12%	-126	-3.08%	4,095
Greene	10,214	60.17%	6,726	39.63%	34	0.20%	3,488	20.55%	16,974
Huntingdon	5,631	37.97%	9,141	61.64%	58	0.39%	-3,510	-23.67%	14,830
Indiana	12,035	43.53%	15,547	56.23%	68	0.25%	-3,512	-12.70%	27,650
Jefferson	8,559	41.37%	12,081	58.40%	47	0.23%	-3,522	-17.03%	20,687
Juniata	3,579	50.46%	3,507	49.44%	7	0.10%	72	1.02%	7,093
Lackawanna	71,343	56.32%	54,931	43.36%	411	0.32%	16,412	12.95%	126,685
Lancaster	32,210	41.62%	44,939	58.07%	245	0.32%	-12,729	-16.45%	77,394
Lawrence	18,814	49.07%	19,361	50.50%	167	0.44%	-547	-1.43%	38,342
Lebanon	13,315	49.61%	13,449	50.11%	73	0.27%	-134	-0.50%	26,837
Lehigh	33,007	52.44%	29,584	47.00%	356	0.57%	3,423	5.44%	62,947
Luzerne	101,577	55.85%	79,685	43.81%	622	0.34%	21,892	12.04%	181,884
Lycoming	18,363	46.05%	21,423	53.72%	91	0.23%	-3,060	-7.67%	39,877
McKean	6,911	31.63%	14,822	67.84%	115	0.53%	-7,911	-36.21%	21,848
Mercer	16,968	44.42%	21,058	55.12%	175	0.46%	-4,090	-10.71%	38,201
Mifflin	6,993	52.31%	6,352	47.51%	24	0.18%	641	4.79%	13,369
Monroe	6,670	52.57%	6,001	47.30%	16	0.13%	669	5.27%	12,687
Montgomery	49,409	40.15%	73,250	59.52%	403	0.33%	-23,841	-19.37%	123,062
Montour	3,080	53.04%	2,723	46.89%	4	0.07%	357	6.15%	5,807
Northampton	33,304	56.49%	25,385	43.06%	266	0.45%	7,919	13.43%	58,955
Northumberland	26,315	53.31%	22,914	46.42%	134	0.27%	3,401	6.89%	49,363
Perry	4,601	43.87%	5,877	56.03%	11	0.10%	-1,276	-12.17%	10,489
Philadelphia	532,149	59.69%	354,878	39.81%	4,459	0.50%	177,271	19.88%	891,486
Pike	1,818	41.08%	2,596	58.65%	12	0.27%	-778	-17.58%	4,426
Potter	2,731	34.30%	5,205	65.36%	27	0.34%	-2,474	-31.07%	7,963
Schuylkill	48,739	52.71%	43,505	47.05%	231	0.25%	5,234	5.66%	92,475
Snyder	2,478	30.17%	5,722	69.66%	14	0.17%	-3,244	-39.49%	8,214
Somerset	14,085	44.71%	17,369	55.13%	52	0.17%	-3,284	-10.42%	31,506
Sullivan	1,626	44.04%	2,059	55.77%	7	0.19%	-433	-11.73%	3,692
Susquehanna	5,383	36.04%	9,520	63.73%	35	0.23%	-4,137	-27.69%	14,938
Tioga	4,434	27.51%	11,645	72.24%	40	0.25%	-7,211	-44.74%	16,119
Union	2,220	28.27%	5,612	71.45%	22	0.28%	-3,392	-43.19%	7,854
Venango	6,873	27.89%	17,728	71.95%	38	0.15%	-10,855	-44.06%	24,639
Warren	5,825	34.39%	11,016	65.04%	97	0.57%	-5,191	-30.65%	16,938
Washington	50,829	63.43%	29,026	36.22%	285	0.36%	21,803	27.21%	80,140
Wayne	3,460	27.26%	9,203	72.50%	30	0.24%	-5,743	-45.25%	12,693
Westmoreland	64,567	59.90%	42,643	39.56%	577	0.54%	21,924	20.34%	107,787
Wyoming	2,548	32.51%	5,273	67.28%	16	0.20%	-2,725	-34.77%	7,837
York	39,543	56.56%	30,228	43.23%	146	0.21%	9,315	13.32%	69,917
Totals	2,175,538	53.35%	1,885,265	46.23%	17,004	0.42%	290,273	7.12%	4,077,807

==== Counties that flipped from Democratic to Republican ====
- Armstrong
- Adams
- Blair
- Bucks
- Centre
- Dauphin
- Elk
- Erie
- Franklin
- Fulton
- Lawrence
- Lebanon
- Lycoming
- Mercer
- Perry
- Pike

== See also ==
- United States presidential elections in Pennsylvania
