= 1968 United States presidential election in Michigan =

- November 5, 1968

All 21 Michigan votes to the Electoral College
- Turnout: 66.8% ▼

Nominee	Hubert Humphrey	Richard Nixon	George Wallace
Party	Democratic	Republican	American Independent
Home state	Minnesota	New York (Note: Although he was born in California and he served as a U.S. senator from California, in 1968 Richard Nixon’s official state of residence was New York, because he moved there to practice law after his defeat in the 1962 California gubernatorial election. During his first term as president, Nixon re-established his residency in California. Consequently, most reliable reference books list Nixon's home state as New York in the 1968 election and his home state as California in the 1972 (and 1960) election.)	Alabama
Running mate	Edmund Muskie	Spiro Agnew	S. Marvin Griffin (Note: Curtis LeMay was eventually selected by George Wallace and Griffin was initially selected as a temporary running mate but by the time Wallace selected LeMay, the State did not allow 3rd parties to make changes on the ballot.)
Electoral vote	21	0	0
Popular vote	1,593,082	1,370,665	331,968
Percentage	48.18%	41.46%	10.04%
County results
Humphrey
40–50%
50–60%
60–70%
Nixon
40–50%
50–60%
60–70%
President before election
Lyndon B. Johnson
Democratic
Elected President
Richard Nixon
Republican

The 1968 United States presidential election in Michigan was held on November 5, 1968. All 50 states and the District of Columbia participated in the 1968 United States presidential election. Voters chose 21 electors to represent them in the Electoral College, who voted for president and vice president.

Michigan was won by the Democratic Party candidate, Vice President Hubert Humphrey, defeating the Republican Party candidate, former vice president Richard Nixon, by a margin of 6.72%, making the state 7.42% more Democratic than the national average. American Independent Party candidate George Wallace, former and future governor of Alabama, received 10% of the vote.

Humphrey's margin of victory was significantly narrower than President Lyndon B. Johnson's landslide 33.60-point triumph in 1964. American involvement in the Vietnam War and rioting throughout the country (including in Detroit) brought about unpopularity for the incumbent president and disenchantment towards his political agenda. Vice President Humphrey vowed to continue the policies of Johnson's Great Society and support civil rights for African Americans, while former vice president Nixon ran on a law and order platform focused on fighting crime and opposing the Johnson administration's handling of the war in Vietnam. Governor Wallace ran a right-wing populist campaign railing against rioting, desegregation, and the counterculture.

Although Wallace did not poll as well in the Midwest as he did in the South, he was able to appeal to blue-collar working-class voters who traditionally voted Democratic but had become disillusioned with crime and the civil-rights movement. As a result, he siphoned off enough votes to allow Nixon to win every state in the region except for Humphrey's home state of Minnesota and Michigan. Even with Michigan being Wallace's second-best Midwestern state behind Ohio, Humphrey was able to hold on to the Wolverine State's electoral votes for the Democrats once more, mainly by running up margins in heavily populated Wayne County (Detroit), neighboring Macomb and Monroe Counties, Genesee County (Flint), and the Upper Peninsula. Nixon would become the first Republican to win the White House without carrying Michigan and this feat would be reprised by George W. Bush in 2000 and 2004. Humphrey was the first losing Democrat to carry Michigan since Lewis Cass in 1848. Michigan would not vote Democratic again until 1992.

This is the last presidential election where Macomb County voted Democratic and Oakland County Republican during the same election. During the post-World War II suburbanization of Detroit, Macomb County saw the influx of white blue-collar Detroiters, who typically backed Democrats, whilst Oakland County residents were more affluent and typically white-collar, usually voting Republican (except in 1964). After that, the two counties would back the same candidate in every election until 2004, when, due to class realignment, Oakland County voted Democratic and Macomb County Republican.

As of the 2024 presidential election, this is the last time that Wayne County cast more than a million votes.

== Campaign ==
The Peace and Freedom Party who appealed to the counterculture along with student radicals and black voters held their party convention at the University of Michigan in Ann Arbor with Eldridge Cleaver of the Black Panther Party being nominated for president despite being under the minimum age requirement to be president as Cleaver was 33 and the minimum age requirement to be president is that one be at least 35 years old when taking office. Despite being underage he would still appear on the ballot in Michigan.

Marvin Griffin appeared on the ballot as George Wallace's running mate in Michigan because Griffin was intended to be a filler candidate and by the time Wallace had selected Curtis LeMay as his running mate it was too late in the state for changes regarding 3rd party candidates on the ballot in the state as Curtis LeMay was selected as his running mate in October and the deadline for 3rd party candidates was in September.

=== Predictions ===
Source	Ranking	As of
St. Petersburg Times	Lean D	September 11, 1968

== Results ==
1968 United States presidential election in Michigan
Party	Candidate	Votes	%
Democratic	Hubert Humphrey	1,593,082	48.18%
Republican	Richard Nixon	1,370,665	41.46%
American Independent	George Wallace	331,968	10.04%
Peace and Freedom	Eldridge Cleaver	4,585	0.14%
Socialist Workers	Fred Halstead	4,099	0.12%
Socialist Labor	Henning A. Blomen	1,762	0.05%
Prohibition	E. Harold Munn	60	0.00%
Write-ins	Scattering	29	0.00%
Total votes		3,306,250	100.00%

=== Results by county ===
County	Hubert Humphrey Democratic		Richard Nixon Republican		George Wallace American Independent		All Others Various		Margin		Total votes cast
County	#	%	#	%	#	%	#	%	#	%	Total votes cast
Alcona	958	30.39%	1,852	58.76%	338	10.72%	4	0.13%	-894	-28.37%	3,152
Alger	1,927	54.87%	1,406	40.03%	173	4.93%	6	0.17%	521	14.84%	3,512
Allegan	7,276	29.72%	14,769	60.32%	2,389	9.76%	49	0.20%	-7,493	-30.60%	24,483
Alpena	4,788	42.52%	5,717	50.77%	747	6.63%	9	0.08%	-929	-8.25%	11,261
Antrim	1,690	33.35%	3,002	59.23%	374	7.38%	2	0.04%	-1,312	-25.88%	5,068
Arenac	1,573	39.43%	2,089	52.37%	324	8.12%	3	0.08%	-516	-12.94%	3,989
Baraga	1,680	50.63%	1,508	45.45%	116	3.50%	14	0.42%	172	5.18%	3,318
Barry	5,206	33.81%	8,492	55.14%	1,674	10.87%	28	0.18%	-3,286	-21.33%	15,400
Bay	21,410	50.30%	18,779	44.12%	2,291	5.38%	87	0.20%	2,631	6.18%	42,567
Benzie	1,147	32.68%	2,138	60.91%	219	6.24%	6	0.17%	-991	-28.23%	3,510
Berrien	21,266	33.80%	32,136	51.08%	9,333	14.83%	181	0.29%	-10,870	-17.28%	62,916
Branch	4,518	35.70%	7,071	55.88%	1,037	8.20%	28	0.22%	-2,553	-20.18%	12,654
Calhoun	22,633	41.18%	26,181	47.64%	5,944	10.82%	202	0.37%	-3,548	-6.46%	54,960
Cass	5,616	37.68%	6,996	46.93%	2,257	15.14%	37	0.25%	-1,380	-9.25%	14,906
Charlevoix	2,446	36.49%	3,696	55.14%	556	8.29%	5	0.07%	-1,250	-18.65%	6,703
Cheboygan	2,840	41.17%	3,422	49.60%	634	9.19%	3	0.04%	-582	-8.43%	6,899
Chippewa	4,132	40.13%	5,359	52.04%	793	7.70%	13	0.13%	-1,227	-11.91%	10,297
Clare	1,909	32.74%	3,315	56.85%	602	10.32%	5	0.09%	-1,406	-24.11%	5,831
Clinton	5,548	33.45%	9,416	56.77%	1,591	9.59%	30	0.18%	-3,868	-23.32%	16,585
Crawford	845	36.74%	1,266	55.04%	187	8.13%	2	0.09%	-421	-18.30%	2,300
Delta	7,821	54.45%	5,829	40.58%	700	4.87%	14	0.10%	1,992	13.87%	14,364
Dickinson	5,726	51.15%	4,920	43.95%	533	4.76%	15	0.13%	806	7.20%	11,194
Eaton	8,347	33.62%	14,184	57.13%	2,252	9.07%	43	0.17%	-5,837	-23.51%	24,826
Emmet	2,624	35.04%	4,405	58.83%	446	5.96%	13	0.17%	-1,781	-23.79%	7,488
Genesee	75,174	45.83%	63,948	38.99%	24,539	14.96%	352	0.21%	11,226	6.84%	164,013
Gladwin	1,668	33.21%	2,840	56.55%	511	10.18%	3	0.06%	-1,172	-23.34%	5,022
Gogebic	5,839	56.00%	4,140	39.71%	434	4.16%	13	0.12%	1,699	16.29%	10,426
Grand Traverse	4,741	32.55%	8,960	61.51%	843	5.79%	23	0.16%	-4,219	-28.96%	14,567
Gratiot	4,040	30.13%	8,404	62.68%	949	7.08%	15	0.11%	-4,364	-32.55%	13,408
Hillsdale	3,803	28.29%	8,506	63.27%	1,107	8.23%	28	0.21%	-4,703	-34.98%	13,444
Houghton	6,988	49.41%	6,639	46.94%	473	3.34%	43	0.30%	349	2.47%	14,143
Huron	3,607	26.62%	8,743	64.51%	1,178	8.69%	24	0.18%	-5,136	-37.89%	13,552
Ingham	37,362	41.08%	46,805	51.46%	6,432	7.07%	354	0.39%	-9,443	-10.38%	90,953
Ionia	6,055	37.92%	8,625	54.01%	1,261	7.90%	27	0.17%	-2,570	-16.09%	15,968
Iosco	2,533	34.51%	4,068	55.42%	736	10.03%	3	0.04%	-1,535	-20.91%	7,340
Iron	4,130	53.14%	3,292	42.36%	340	4.37%	10	0.13%	838	10.78%	7,772
Isabella	4,450	35.90%	7,111	57.37%	808	6.52%	27	0.22%	-2,661	-21.47%	12,396
Jackson	18,205	35.11%	27,828	53.66%	5,689	10.97%	135	0.26%	-9,623	-18.55%	51,857
Kalamazoo	26,437	35.81%	39,796	53.90%	7,398	10.02%	201	0.27%	-13,359	-18.09%	73,832
Kalkaska	753	33.72%	1,190	53.29%	288	12.90%	2	0.09%	-437	-19.57%	2,233
Kent	61,891	38.72%	85,810	53.68%	11,584	7.25%	565	0.35%	-23,919	-14.96%	159,850
Keweenaw	602	50.42%	525	43.97%	65	5.44%	2	0.17%	77	6.45%	1,194
Lake	1,482	52.97%	1,094	39.10%	220	7.86%	2	0.07%	388	13.87%	2,798
Lapeer	5,199	32.17%	8,866	54.85%	2,081	12.88%	17	0.11%	-3,667	-22.68%	16,163
Leelanau	1,562	33.53%	2,798	60.06%	292	6.27%	7	0.15%	-1,236	-26.53%	4,659
Lenawee	10,552	36.20%	16,280	55.85%	2,197	7.54%	118	0.40%	-5,728	-19.65%	29,147
Livingston	7,052	35.85%	10,034	51.01%	2,543	12.93%	41	0.21%	-2,982	-15.16%	19,670
Luce	855	36.92%	1,351	58.33%	109	4.71%	1	0.04%	-496	-21.41%	2,316
Mackinac	1,751	38.26%	2,507	54.77%	317	6.93%	2	0.04%	-756	-16.51%	4,577
Macomb	114,552	55.19%	63,139	30.42%	29,239	14.09%	647	0.31%	51,413	24.77%	207,577
Manistee	3,671	44.20%	4,007	48.24%	614	7.39%	14	0.17%	-336	-4.04%	8,306
Marquette	11,199	53.34%	8,960	42.68%	802	3.82%	34	0.16%	2,239	10.66%	20,995
Mason	3,660	37.23%	5,311	54.02%	854	8.69%	6	0.06%	-1,651	-16.79%	9,831
Mecosta	2,738	32.49%	5,053	59.97%	625	7.42%	10	0.12%	-2,315	-27.48%	8,426
Menominee	4,877	48.25%	4,599	45.50%	620	6.13%	12	0.12%	278	2.75%	10,108
Midland	7,428	31.40%	14,329	60.57%	1,849	7.82%	52	0.22%	-6,901	-29.17%	23,658
Missaukee	736	23.06%	2,161	67.72%	292	9.15%	2	0.06%	-1,425	-44.66%	3,191
Monroe	18,921	47.81%	15,685	39.64%	4,873	12.31%	93	0.24%	3,236	8.17%	39,572
Montcalm	5,303	35.59%	8,329	55.89%	1,244	8.35%	26	0.17%	-3,026	-20.30%	14,902
Montmorency	810	34.45%	1,279	54.40%	260	11.06%	2	0.09%	-469	-19.95%	2,351
Muskegon	24,492	41.74%	28,233	48.11%	5,808	9.90%	150	0.26%	-3,741	-6.37%	58,683
Newaygo	3,369	30.49%	6,626	59.97%	1,042	9.43%	11	0.10%	-3,257	-29.48%	11,048
Oakland	154,630	44.76%	156,538	45.31%	33,024	9.56%	1,266	0.37%	-1,908	-0.55%	345,458
Oceana	2,152	30.93%	3,911	56.22%	876	12.59%	18	0.26%	-1,759	-25.29%	6,957
Ogemaw	1,647	35.57%	2,526	54.56%	454	9.81%	3	0.06%	-879	-18.99%	4,630
Ontonagon	2,462	49.15%	2,290	45.72%	252	5.03%	5	0.10%	172	3.43%	5,009
Osceola	1,509	25.97%	3,705	63.77%	583	10.03%	13	0.22%	-2,196	-37.80%	5,810
Oscoda	563	30.53%	1,124	60.95%	157	8.51%	0	0.00%	-561	-30.42%	1,844
Otsego	1,661	43.79%	1,871	49.33%	259	6.83%	2	0.05%	-210	-5.54%	3,793
Ottawa	12,431	25.19%	33,356	67.60%	3,460	7.01%	95	0.19%	-20,925	-42.41%	49,342
Presque Isle	2,300	43.80%	2,565	48.85%	385	7.33%	1	0.02%	-265	-5.05%	5,251
Roscommon	1,639	34.78%	2,635	55.91%	431	9.14%	8	0.17%	-996	-21.13%	4,713
Saginaw	32,266	41.67%	38,070	49.17%	6,906	8.92%	181	0.23%	-5,804	-7.50%	77,423
Sanilac	3,193	22.54%	9,273	65.45%	1,692	11.94%	10	0.07%	-6,080	-42.91%	14,168
Schoolcraft	1,869	48.62%	1,745	45.40%	227	5.91%	3	0.08%	124	3.22%	3,844
Shiawassee	8,619	38.25%	11,465	50.88%	2,377	10.55%	71	0.32%	-2,846	-12.63%	22,532
St. Clair	16,251	38.09%	21,084	49.41%	5,261	12.33%	73	0.17%	-4,833	-11.32%	42,669
St. Joseph	5,413	30.68%	10,445	59.20%	1,759	9.97%	28	0.16%	-5,032	-28.52%	17,645
Tuscola	4,698	28.28%	10,205	61.44%	1,682	10.13%	25	0.15%	-5,507	-33.16%	16,610
Van Buren	7,304	35.44%	10,676	51.81%	2,560	12.42%	67	0.33%	-3,372	-16.37%	20,607
Washtenaw	33,073	42.50%	36,432	46.82%	7,456	9.58%	853	1.10%	-3,359	-4.32%	77,814
Wayne	654,157	63.25%	270,566	26.16%	105,606	10.21%	3,931	0.38%	383,591	37.09%	1,034,260
Wexford	2,832	36.59%	4,364	56.38%	535	6.91%	9	0.12%	-1,532	-19.79%	7,740
Totals	1,593,082	48.18%	1,370,665	41.46%	331,968	10.04%	10,535	0.32%	222,417	6.72%	3,306,250

==== Counties that flipped from Democratic to Republican ====
- Alcona
- Allegan
- Alpena
- Antrim
- Arenac
- Barry
- Benzie
- Berrien
- Branch
- Calhoun
- Cass
- Charlevoix
- Cheboygan
- Chippewa
- Clare
- Clinton
- Crawford
- Eaton
- Emmet
- Gladwin
- Grand Traverse
- Hillsdale
- Huron
- Ingham
- Ionia
- Iosco
- Isabella
- Jackson
- Kalamazoo
- Kalkaska
- Kent
- Lapeer
- Leelanau
- Lenawee
- Livingston
- Luce
- Mackinac
- Manistee
- Mason
- Mecosta
- Midland
- Montcalm
- Montmorency
- Muskegon
- Newaygo
- Oakland
- Ogemaw
- Osceola
- Oscoda
- Otsego
- Presque Isle
- Roscommon
- Saginaw
- Shiawassee
- St. Clair
- St. Joseph
- Tuscola
- Van Buren
- Washtenaw
- Wexford

=== Results by congressional district ===
District	Nixon	Humphrey	Wallace
1st	28.2%	55.6%	16.2%
2nd	48.1%	41.7%	10.2%
3rd	53.1%	36.7%	10.1%
4th	54.5%	33.2%	12.3%
5th	53.9%	38.8%	7.3%
6th	52.1%	39%	8.9%
7th	40.5%	47.7%	14.8%
8th	53.2%	36.6%	10.2%
9th	56.9%	34.7%	8.3%
10th	55.1%	37.2%	7.7%
11th	46.8%	47.6%	5.5%
12th	30.5%	55.4%	14.2%
13th	10.7%	84.2%	5%
14th	33.8%	54.5%	11.7%
15th	28.2%	55.6%	16.2%
16th	27.3%	60%	12.7%
17th	30.7%	59.5%	9.8%
18th	45.5%	46.7%	7.8%
19th	44.3%	43.8%	12%

== See also ==
- United States presidential elections in Michigan
