= 1940 United States presidential election in Michigan =

- November 5, 1940

All 19 Michigan votes to the Electoral College

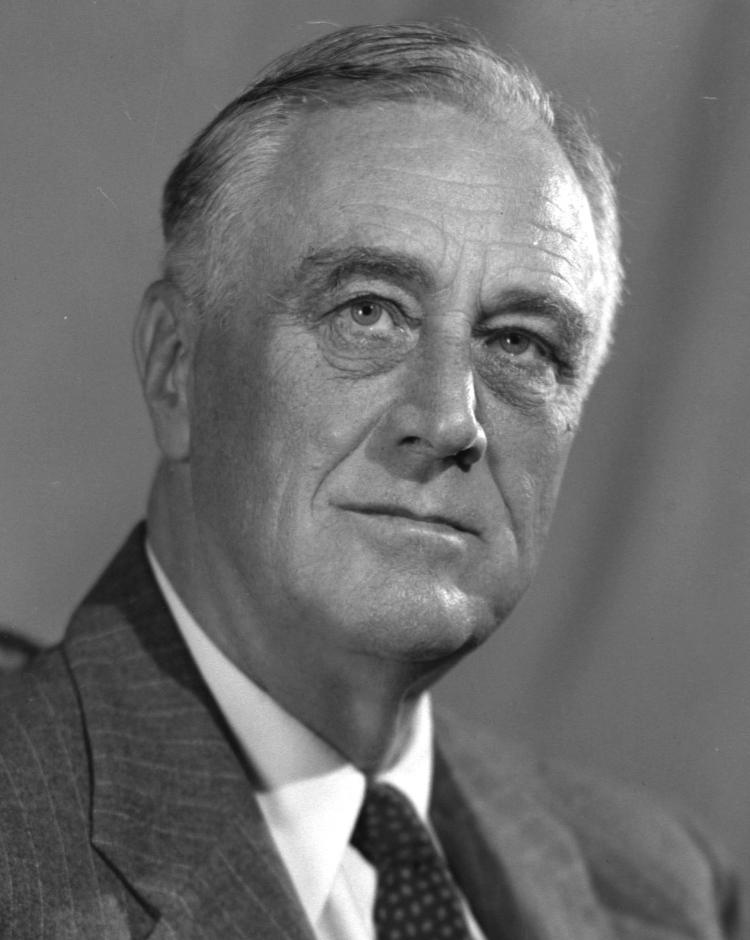
Nominee	Wendell Willkie	Franklin D. Roosevelt
Party	Republican	Democratic
Home state	New York	New York
Running mate	Charles L. McNary	Henry A. Wallace
Electoral vote	19	0
Popular vote	1,039,917	1,032,991
Percentage	49.85%	49.52%
County results
Willkie
50–60%
60–70%
70–80%
80–90%
Roosevelt
40–50%
50–60%
60–70%
President before election
Franklin D. Roosevelt
Democratic
Elected President
Franklin D. Roosevelt
Democratic

The 1940 United States presidential election in Michigan took place on November 5, 1940, as part of the 1940 United States presidential election. Voters chose 19 representatives, or electors, to the Electoral College, who voted for president and vice president.

Michigan was narrowly won by the Republican candidate Wendell Willkie over Democratic incumbent Franklin D. Roosevelt by 6,926 votes in the closest race in any statewide presidential election since 1916 when Woodrow Wilson won by 56 votes in New Hampshire and opponent Charles Evans Hughes won in Minnesota by 392 votes. Willkie received 49.85% of ballots cast, while Roosevelt received 49.52%. Roosevelt's result in Michigan remains the highest percentage of the vote received by a candidate who still lost the state. This was the only election where Michigan supported Roosevelt's opponent, and it was also the only one of the ten states won by Willkie that Roosevelt would reclaim in 1944. This is also one of only four occasions where Michigan and Pennsylvania voted for different presidential candidates ever since the Democrats and Republicans became the two major parties in U.S. politics. (Note: The other times were in 1856, 1932, and 1976.)

== Results ==
1940 United States presidential election in Michigan
Party	Candidate	Votes	%
Republican	Wendell Willkie	1,039,917	49.85%
Democratic	Franklin D. Roosevelt (inc.)	1,032,991	49.52%
Socialist	Norman Thomas	7,593	0.36%
Communist	Earl Browder	2,834	0.14%
Prohibition	Roger Babson	1,795	0.09%
Socialist Labor	John W. Aiken	795	0.04%
Write-in	Scattering	4	0.00%
Total votes		2,085,929	100.00%

=== Results by county ===
County	Wendell Willkie Republican		Franklin D. Roosevelt Democratic		Norman Thomas Socialist		Earl Browder Communist		All others Various		Margin		Total votes cast
County	#	%	#	%	#	%	#	%	#	%	#	%	Total votes cast
Alcona	1,648	65.89%	847	33.87%	5	0.20%	1	0.04%	0	0.00%	801	32.03%	2,501
Alger	1,629	34.89%	2,984	63.91%	12	0.26%	44	0.94%	6	0.13%	-1,355	-29.02%	4,669
Allegan	12,347	69.51%	5,385	30.31%	28	0.16%	4	0.02%	28	0.16%	6,962	39.19%	17,764
Alpena	4,822	57.19%	3,597	42.66%	12	0.14%	1	0.01%	0	0.00%	1,225	14.53%	8,432
Antrim	3,027	66.75%	1,497	33.01%	10	0.22%	1	0.02%	18	0.40%	1,530	33.74%	4,535
Arenac	2,293	60.31%	1,499	39.43%	8	0.21%	2	0.05%	5	0.13%	794	20.88%	3,802
Baraga	2,512	53.52%	2,152	45.85%	7	0.15%	23	0.49%	3	0.06%	360	7.67%	4,694
Barry	6,872	68.56%	3,091	30.84%	25	0.25%	35	0.35%	2	0.02%	3,781	37.72%	10,023
Bay	14,618	49.44%	14,902	50.40%	43	0.15%	2	0.01%	22	0.07%	-284	-0.96%	29,565
Benzie	2,320	61.64%	1,429	37.96%	14	0.37%	1	0.03%	1	0.03%	891	23.67%	3,764
Berrien	22,778	57.11%	16,961	42.52%	143	0.36%	4	0.01%	61	0.15%	5,817	14.58%	39,886
Branch	7,400	63.01%	4,318	36.77%	21	0.18%	5	0.04%	20	0.17%	3,082	26.24%	11,744
Calhoun	21,633	53.37%	18,682	46.09%	182	0.45%	35	0.09%	78	0.19%	2,951	7.28%	40,532
Cass	6,868	61.09%	4,340	38.60%	32	0.28%	3	0.03%	25	0.22%	2,528	22.49%	11,243
Charlevoix	3,522	61.42%	2,162	37.70%	40	0.70%	10	0.17%	1	0.02%	1,360	23.72%	5,734
Cheboygan	3,646	55.96%	2,856	43.84%	8	0.12%	5	0.08%	8	0.12%	790	12.13%	6,515
Chippewa	5,851	51.56%	5,473	48.23%	11	0.10%	13	0.11%	5	0.04%	378	3.33%	11,348
Clare	3,004	69.91%	1,277	29.72%	13	0.30%	3	0.07%	3	0.07%	1,727	40.19%	4,297
Clinton	8,311	75.04%	2,745	24.78%	19	0.17%	1	0.01%	5	0.05%	5,566	50.25%	11,076
Crawford	873	52.53%	777	46.75%	9	0.54%	3	0.18%	0	0.00%	96	5.78%	1,662
Delta	6,218	41.20%	8,802	58.31%	43	0.28%	31	0.21%	7	0.05%	-2,584	-17.12%	15,094
Dickinson	6,188	44.68%	7,582	54.75%	46	0.33%	33	0.24%	10	0.07%	-1,394	-10.07%	13,849
Eaton	9,864	63.36%	5,645	36.26%	57	0.37%	1	0.01%	27	0.17%	4,219	27.10%	15,567
Emmet	4,216	59.64%	2,831	40.05%	20	0.28%	2	0.03%	2	0.03%	1,385	19.59%	7,069
Genesee	38,495	43.16%	50,300	56.39%	298	0.33%	105	0.12%	85	0.10%	-11,805	-13.23%	89,198
Gladwin	2,741	67.80%	1,294	32.01%	6	0.15%	2	0.05%	1	0.02%	1,447	35.79%	4,043
Gogebic	6,431	40.92%	9,104	57.93%	80	0.51%	100	0.64%	19	0.12%	-2,673	-17.01%	15,715
Grand Traverse	5,620	64.33%	3,095	35.43%	20	0.23%	1	0.01%	9	0.10%	2,525	28.90%	8,736
Gratiot	8,661	69.19%	3,825	30.56%	30	0.24%	1	0.01%	34	0.27%	4,836	38.64%	12,517
Hillsdale	9,398	72.38%	3,538	27.25%	44	0.34%	4	0.03%	23	0.18%	5,860	45.13%	12,984
Houghton	11,030	50.32%	10,815	49.34%	20	0.09%	53	0.24%	8	0.04%	215	0.98%	21,918
Huron	10,570	79.78%	2,654	20.03%	24	0.18%	1	0.01%	9	0.07%	7,916	59.75%	13,249
Ingham	32,565	56.89%	24,375	42.58%	290	0.51%	15	0.03%	137	0.24%	8,190	14.31%	57,245
Ionia	9,439	63.29%	5,399	36.20%	36	0.24%	41	0.27%	1	0.01%	4,040	27.09%	14,915
Iosco	2,504	65.52%	1,303	34.09%	14	0.37%	1	0.03%	3	0.08%	1,201	31.42%	3,822
Iron	4,766	49.36%	4,808	49.79%	27	0.28%	55	0.57%	5	0.05%	-42	-0.43%	9,656
Isabella	7,019	71.12%	2,828	28.66%	17	0.17%	5	0.05%	22	0.22%	4,191	42.47%	9,869
Jackson	24,558	61.59%	15,170	38.05%	115	0.29%	30	0.08%	67	0.17%	9,388	23.54%	39,873
Kalamazoo	25,596	58.86%	17,733	40.78%	139	0.32%	17	0.04%	137	0.32%	7,863	18.08%	43,485
Kalkaska	1,155	61.31%	718	38.11%	4	0.21%	7	0.37%	1	0.05%	437	23.20%	1,884
Kent	53,131	52.17%	48,196	47.33%	440	0.43%	68	0.07%	241	0.24%	4,935	4.85%	101,835
Keweenaw	1,080	52.53%	967	47.03%	1	0.05%	8	0.39%	4	0.19%	113	5.50%	2,056
Lake	1,413	56.70%	1,070	42.94%	5	0.20%	4	0.16%	3	0.12%	343	13.76%	2,492
Lapeer	7,714	69.86%	3,299	29.88%	22	0.20%	7	0.06%	2	0.02%	4,415	39.98%	11,042
Leelanau	2,405	66.11%	1,223	33.62%	8	0.22%	2	0.05%	1	0.03%	1,182	32.49%	3,638
Lenawee	16,963	70.27%	7,132	29.54%	40	0.17%	5	0.02%	26	0.11%	9,831	40.72%	24,140
Livingston	7,068	68.30%	3,254	31.45%	25	0.24%	1	0.01%	8	0.08%	3,814	36.86%	10,348
Luce	1,542	58.99%	1,069	40.90%	1	0.04%	2	0.08%	3	0.11%	473	18.09%	2,614
Mackinac	2,591	55.38%	2,075	44.35%	12	0.26%	1	0.02%	0	0.00%	516	11.03%	4,679
Macomb	17,848	45.74%	21,003	53.82%	130	0.33%	42	0.11%	31	0.08%	-3,155	-8.08%	39,023
Manistee	4,630	52.08%	4,242	47.72%	15	0.17%	3	0.03%	2	0.02%	388	4.36%	8,890
Marquette	9,034	41.12%	12,854	58.51%	41	0.19%	39	0.18%	14	0.06%	-3,820	-17.39%	21,968
Mason	4,874	55.72%	3,836	43.85%	27	0.31%	11	0.13%	15	0.17%	1,038	11.87%	8,748
Mecosta	4,759	68.68%	2,153	31.07%	12	0.17%	5	0.07%	3	0.04%	2,606	37.61%	6,929
Menominee	5,409	48.34%	5,727	51.18%	51	0.46%	3	0.03%	18	0.16%	-318	-2.84%	11,190
Midland	6,269	61.81%	3,834	37.80%	37	0.36%	3	0.03%	14	0.14%	2,435	24.01%	10,143
Missaukee	2,154	66.83%	1,037	32.17%	7	0.22%	25	0.78%	0	0.00%	1,117	34.66%	3,223
Monroe	13,517	56.51%	10,368	43.34%	30	0.13%	5	0.02%	25	0.10%	3,149	13.16%	23,920
Montcalm	7,633	64.48%	4,119	34.80%	83	0.70%	2	0.02%	18	0.15%	3,514	29.69%	11,837
Montmorency	1,189	60.48%	768	39.06%	7	0.36%	2	0.10%	0	0.00%	421	21.41%	1,966
Muskegon	14,957	43.52%	19,257	56.03%	130	0.38%	27	0.08%	53	0.15%	-4,300	-12.51%	34,371
Newaygo	5,418	66.62%	2,693	33.11%	13	0.16%	9	0.11%	12	0.15%	2,725	33.51%	8,133
Oakland	49,002	50.79%	47,022	48.73%	393	0.41%	71	0.07%	135	0.14%	1,980	2.05%	96,488
Oceana	3,711	60.74%	2,379	38.94%	19	0.31%	1	0.02%	17	0.28%	1,332	21.80%	6,110
Ogemaw	2,447	65.45%	1,278	34.18%	10	0.27%	4	0.11%	0	0.00%	1,169	31.27%	3,739
Ontonagon	2,880	47.14%	3,103	50.79%	13	0.21%	114	1.87%	6	0.10%	-223	-3.65%	6,110
Osceola	4,217	72.86%	1,555	26.87%	3	0.05%	13	0.22%	1	0.02%	2,662	45.99%	5,788
Oscoda	661	61.60%	409	38.12%	3	0.28%	0	0.00%	0	0.00%	252	23.49%	1,073
Otsego	1,353	54.60%	1,119	45.16%	5	0.20%	1	0.04%	2	0.08%	234	9.44%	2,478
Ottawa	15,462	62.54%	9,152	37.02%	94	0.38%	15	0.06%	61	0.25%	6,310	25.52%	24,723
Presque Isle	2,552	49.48%	2,595	50.31%	10	0.19%	1	0.02%	2	0.04%	-43	-0.83%	5,158
Roscommon	1,360	64.21%	739	34.89%	17	0.80%	2	0.09%	0	0.00%	621	29.32%	2,118
Saginaw	27,042	54.40%	22,490	45.24%	164	0.33%	18	0.04%	39	0.08%	4,552	9.16%	49,714
Sanilac	10,289	82.23%	2,195	17.54%	27	0.22%	2	0.02%	14	0.11%	8,094	64.68%	12,513
Schoolcraft	2,003	46.24%	2,320	53.55%	8	0.18%	1	0.02%	2	0.05%	-317	-7.32%	4,332
Shiawassee	9,995	63.32%	5,727	36.28%	58	0.37%	5	0.03%	19	0.12%	4,268	27.04%	15,785
St. Clair	18,635	60.21%	12,259	39.61%	54	0.17%	2	0.01%	26	0.08%	6,376	20.60%	30,950
St. Joseph	10,025	66.39%	5,045	33.41%	28	0.19%	2	0.01%	15	0.10%	4,980	32.98%	15,100
Tuscola	10,146	75.52%	3,257	24.24%	31	0.23%	1	0.01%	13	0.10%	6,889	51.28%	13,435
Van Buren	11,571	67.02%	5,625	32.58%	54	0.31%	15	0.09%	32	0.19%	5,946	34.44%	17,265
Washtenaw	21,664	64.33%	11,802	35.05%	196	0.58%	13	0.04%	44	0.13%	9,862	29.29%	33,675
Wayne	275,974	37.70%	451,003	61.61%	3,269	0.45%	1,741	0.24%	582	0.08%	-175,029	-23.91%	731,987
Wexford	4,322	59.22%	2,947	40.38%	28	0.38%	1	0.01%	28	0.38%	1,375	18.84%	7,298
Totals	1,039,917	49.92%	1,032,991	49.58%	7,593	0.36%	2,834	0.14%	2,594	0.12%	6,926	0.33%	2,083,335

==== Counties that flipped from Democratic to Republican ====
- Arenac
- Baraga
- Berrien
- Calhoun
- Cass
- Cheboygan
- Chippewa
- Crawford
- Eaton
- Emmet
- Grand Traverse
- Gratiot
- Houghton
- Ingham
- Ionia
- Jackson
- Kalamazoo
- Kalkaska
- Kent
- Lake
- Luce
- Mackinac
- Manistee
- Mason
- Monroe
- Montmorency
- Oceana
- Oakland
- Ogemaw
- Otsego
- Oscoda
- Saginaw
- Shiawassee
- Wexford

== See also ==
- United States presidential elections in Michigan
