= Michigan's congressional districts =

U.S. House districts in the state of Michigan

Michigan's congressional districts since January 3, 2023 Interactive map version

Michigan is divided into 13 congressional districts, each represented by a member of the United States House of Representatives.

The districts are currently represented in the 119th United States Congress by 7 Republicans and 6 Democrats.

Due to considerable demographic and population change in Michigan over the years, an individual numbered district today does not necessarily cover the same geographic area as the same numbered district before reapportionment. For example, Pete Hoekstra, Bill Huizenga and John Moolenaar have represented the 2nd district since 1993, but are considered the "successors" of Guy Vander Jagt, since the current 2nd covers most of the territory represented by Vander Jagt in the 9th district before 1993.

Michigan lost a congressional seat after the 2022 midterm elections based on information from the 2020 United States census.

== Current districts and representatives ==
List of members of the House delegation, time in office, district maps, and the district political ratings according to the CPVI. The delegation has 13 members, 7 Republicans, 5 Democrats and one Independent.

Current U.S. representatives from Michigan
District	Member (Residence)	Party	Incumbent since	CPVI (2025)	District map
1st	Jack Bergman (Watersmeet)	Republican	January 3, 2017	R+11	
2nd	John Moolenaar (Caledonia)	Republican	January 3, 2015	R+15	
3rd	Hillary Scholten (Grand Rapids)	Democratic	January 3, 2023	D+4	
4th	Bill Huizenga (Holland)	Republican	January 3, 2011	R+3	
5th	Tim Walberg (Tipton)	Republican	January 3, 2011	R+13	
6th	Debbie Dingell (Ann Arbor)	Democratic	January 3, 2015	D+12	
7th	Tom Barrett (Charlotte)	Republican	January 3, 2025	EVEN	
8th	Kristen McDonald Rivet (Bay City)	Democratic	January 3, 2025	R+1	
9th	Lisa McClain (Bruce Township)	Republican	January 3, 2021	R+16	
10th	John James (Shelby Charter Township)	Republican	January 3, 2023	R+3	
11th	Haley Stevens (Birmingham)	Democratic	January 3, 2019	D+9	
12th	Rashida Tlaib (Detroit)	Democratic	January 3, 2019	D+21	
13th	Shri Thanedar (Detroit)	Democratic	January 3, 2023	D+22	

== Historical district boundaries ==
Below is a table of United States congressional district boundary maps for the State of Michigan, presented chronologically forward. All redistricting events that took place in Michigan in the decades between 1973 and 2013 are shown.

Year	Statewide map	Congressional delegation
1973–1982		1/3/1973–1/3/1974: 7 Democrats, 12 Republicans 1/3/1974–1/3/1975: 9 Democrats, 10 Republicans 1/3/1975–1/3/1977: 12 Democrats, 7 Republicans 1/3/1977–1/3/1979: 11 Democrats, 8 Republicans 1/3/1979–1/3/1981: 13 Democrats, 6 Republicans 1/3/1981–1/3/1983: 12 Democrats, 7 Republicans
1983–1992		1/3/1983–1/3/1985: 12 Democrats, 6 Republicans 1/3/1985–1/3/1987: 11 Democrats, 7 Republicans 1/3/1987–1/3/1989: 11 Democrats, 7 Republicans 1/3/1989–1/3/1991: 11 Democrats, 7 Republicans 1/3/1991–1/3/1993: 11 Democrats, 7 Republicans
1993–2002	Note: The orange 6th is mislabeled; it should read 13th.	1/3/1993–1/3/1995: 10 Democrats, 6 Republicans 1/3/1995–1/3/1997: 9 Democrats, 7 Republicans 1/3/1997–1/3/1999: 10 Democrats, 6 Republicans 1/3/1999-1/3/2001: 10 Democrats, 6 Republicans 1/3/2001-1/3/2003: 9 Democrats, 7 Republicans
2003–2013		1/3/2003-1/3/2005: 6 Democrats, 9 Republicans 1/3/2005-1/3/2007: 6 Democrats, 9 Republicans 1/3/2007-1/3/2009: 6 Democrats, 9 Republicans 1/3/2009-1/3/11: 8 Democrats, 7 Republicans 1/3/2011–7/6/2012: 6 Democrats, 9 Republicans 7/6/2012-11/6/2012: 6 Democrats, 8 Republicans, 1 Vacant seat 11/6/2012-1/3/2013: 7 Democrats, 8 Republicans
2013–2023		1/3/2013–1/3/2015: 5 Democrats, 9 Republicans 1/3/2015–1/3/2017: 5 Democrats, 9 Republicans 1/3/2017-1/3/2019: 5 Democrats, 9 Republicans 1/3/2019-7/4/2019: 7 Democrats, 7 Republicans 7/4/2019-5/4/2020: 7 Democrats, 6 Republicans, 1 Independent 5/4/2020-12/14/2020: 7 Democrats, 6 Republicans, 1 Libertarian 12/14/2020–1/3/2021: 7 Democrats, 5 Republicans, 1 Libertarian, 1 independent 1/3/2021–1/3/2023: 7 Democrats, 7 Republicans
Since 2023		1/3/2023–1/3/2025: 7 Democrats, 6 Republicans 1/3/2025–present: 7 Republicans, 6 Democrats

== Obsolete districts ==
- Michigan's at-large congressional district
- Michigan's 14th congressional district
- Michigan's 15th congressional district
- Michigan's 16th congressional district
- Michigan's 17th congressional district
- Michigan's 18th congressional district
- Michigan's 19th congressional district

== See also ==
- Michigan's congressional delegations
- List of United States congressional districts
