= 1976 United States presidential election in Michigan =

- November 2, 1976

All 21 Michigan votes to the Electoral College
- Turnout: 59.4%

Nominee	Gerald Ford	Jimmy Carter
Party	Republican	Democratic
Home state	Michigan	Georgia
Running mate	Bob Dole	Walter Mondale
Electoral vote	21	0
Popular vote	1,893,742	1,696,714
Percentage	51.83%	46.44%
County results
Ford
40–50%
50–60%
60–70%
70–80%
Carter
40–50%
50–60%
60–70%
President before election
Gerald Ford
Republican
Elected President
Jimmy Carter
Democratic

The 1976 United States presidential election in Michigan was held on November 2, 1976, as part of the 1976 United States presidential election.

Michigan was won by the incumbent President Gerald Ford, who won his home state with 51.83% of the vote, a victory margin of 5.39 points over Carter, thereby carrying its 21 electoral votes. This result made Michigan about 7.5% more Republican than the nation at large. However, he narrowly lost the general election to Democratic candidate Jimmy Carter. This is currently the only time since 1948 that a Democrat won the presidency without winning Michigan, although Democrats won the popular vote without the state in 2016. Carter also became the first Democrat to win the White House without carrying Macomb County since Woodrow Wilson in 1916. The state would not vote for a losing candidate again until 2000, and for the loser of the popular vote until 2004.

As of the 2024 presidential election, this is the final occasion of only four where Michigan and Pennsylvania voted for different presidential candidates ever since the Democrats and Republicans became the two major parties in U.S. politics. (Note: The other times were in 1856, 1932, and 1940.) This is also the last time that Michigan voted more Republican than Texas, Oklahoma, or Florida; and that the Democratic candidate lost Michigan but won neighboring Ohio.

== Primary election ==
=== Democratic party ===
Democratic primary results
Party	Candidate	Votes	%
Democratic	Jimmy Carter	307,559	43.40%
Democratic	Mo Udall	305,134	43.06%
Democratic	George Wallace	49,204	6.94%
Democratic	Henry M. Jackson	10,332	1.46%
Democratic	Ellen McCormack	7,623	1.07%
Democratic	Sargent Shriver	5,738	0.81%
Democratic	Fred R. Harris	4,081	0.58%
Democratic	Uncommitted	15,853	2.24%
Democratic	Scattering	3,142	0.44%
Total votes		708,666	100.00%

=== Republican party ===
Republican primary results
Party	Candidate	Votes	%
Republican	Gerald Ford (inc.)	690,180	64.94%
Republican	Ronald Reagan	364,052	34.25%
Republican	Uncommitted	8,473	0.80%
Republican	Scattering	109	0.01%
Total votes		1,062,814	100.00%

== General election ==
=== Results ===
1976 United States presidential election in Michigan
Party	Candidate	Votes	%
Republican	Gerald Ford (inc.)	1,893,742	51.83%
Democratic	Jimmy Carter	1,696,714	46.44%
Independent	Eugene McCarthy	47,905	1.31%
Libertarian	Roger MacBride	5,406	0.15%
People's	Margaret Wright	3,504	0.10%
Socialist Workers	Peter Camejo	1,804	0.05%
U.S. Labor	Lyndon LaRouche	1,366	0.04%
Socialist Labor	Julius Levin	1,148	0.03%
Write-ins	Scattering	2,160	0.06%
Total votes		3,653,749	100.00%

==== Results by county ====
County	Gerald Ford Republican		Jimmy Carter Democratic		Eugene McCarthy Independent		All Others Various		Margin		Total votes cast
County	#	%	#	%	#	%	#	%	#	%	Total votes cast
Alcona	2,328	52.87%	2,038	46.29%	31	0.70%	6	0.14%	290	6.58%	4,403
Alger	1,722	41.38%	2,379	57.17%	47	1.13%	13	0.31%	-657	-15.79%	4,161
Allegan	19,330	65.59%	9,794	33.23%	266	0.90%	81	0.27%	9,536	32.36%	29,471
Alpena	6,380	49.59%	6,310	49.04%	145	1.13%	31	0.24%	70	0.55%	12,866
Antrim	4,369	58.11%	3,032	40.33%	92	1.22%	25	0.33%	1,337	17.78%	7,518
Arenac	2,687	49.55%	2,695	49.70%	28	0.52%	13	0.24%	-8	-0.15%	5,423
Baraga	1,788	49.47%	1,778	49.20%	33	0.91%	15	0.42%	10	0.27%	3,614
Barry	11,178	60.79%	6,967	37.89%	172	0.94%	71	0.39%	4,211	22.90%	18,388
Bay	23,174	46.64%	25,958	52.24%	423	0.85%	134	0.27%	-2,784	-5.60%	49,689
Benzie	3,085	61.23%	1,891	37.53%	53	1.05%	9	0.18%	1,194	23.70%	5,038
Berrien	40,835	61.13%	25,163	37.67%	569	0.85%	231	0.35%	15,672	23.46%	66,798
Branch	8,251	55.74%	6,301	42.57%	160	1.08%	90	0.61%	1,950	13.17%	14,802
Calhoun	30,390	53.77%	25,229	44.64%	683	1.21%	218	0.39%	5,161	9.13%	56,520
Cass	9,893	55.15%	7,843	43.72%	138	0.77%	65	0.36%	2,050	11.43%	17,939
Charlevoix	5,145	55.57%	3,953	42.70%	117	1.26%	43	0.46%	1,192	12.87%	9,258
Cheboygan	4,894	55.13%	3,880	43.70%	81	0.91%	23	0.26%	1,014	11.43%	8,878
Chippewa	7,025	53.32%	6,022	45.71%	99	0.75%	29	0.22%	1,003	7.61%	13,175
Clare	4,879	53.46%	4,153	45.51%	68	0.75%	26	0.28%	726	7.95%	9,126
Clinton	13,475	63.11%	7,549	35.35%	231	1.08%	98	0.46%	5,926	27.76%	21,353
Crawford	2,359	54.82%	1,889	43.90%	46	1.07%	9	0.21%	470	10.92%	4,303
Delta	7,809	45.85%	9,027	53.00%	155	0.91%	42	0.25%	-1,218	-7.15%	17,033
Dickinson	5,922	48.63%	6,134	50.37%	97	0.80%	24	0.20%	-212	-1.74%	12,177
Eaton	22,120	63.65%	12,083	34.77%	430	1.24%	117	0.34%	10,037	28.88%	34,750
Emmet	5,910	58.49%	4,013	39.72%	129	1.28%	52	0.51%	1,897	18.77%	10,104
Genesee	80,004	46.67%	88,967	51.89%	1,790	1.04%	677	0.39%	-8,963	-5.22%	171,438
Gladwin	3,794	50.14%	3,719	49.15%	34	0.45%	20	0.26%	75	0.99%	7,567
Gogebic	3,953	38.04%	6,341	61.02%	74	0.71%	24	0.23%	-2,388	-22.98%	10,392
Grand Traverse	13,505	63.85%	7,263	34.34%	295	1.39%	87	0.41%	6,242	29.51%	21,150
Gratiot	9,526	63.01%	5,429	35.91%	108	0.71%	55	0.36%	4,097	27.10%	15,118
Hillsdale	9,307	62.23%	5,427	36.29%	139	0.93%	82	0.55%	3,880	25.94%	14,955
Houghton	8,049	51.60%	7,352	47.13%	145	0.93%	54	0.35%	697	4.47%	15,600
Huron	9,297	61.26%	5,721	37.70%	118	0.78%	40	0.26%	3,576	23.56%	15,176
Ingham	66,729	55.92%	47,890	40.13%	3,636	3.05%	1,072	0.90%	18,839	15.79%	119,327
Ionia	11,737	62.46%	6,820	36.29%	187	1.00%	47	0.25%	4,917	26.17%	18,791
Iosco	5,500	52.39%	4,875	46.44%	74	0.70%	49	0.47%	625	5.95%	10,498
Iron	3,224	41.77%	4,401	57.02%	68	0.88%	25	0.32%	-1,177	-15.25%	7,718
Isabella	10,577	57.66%	7,281	39.69%	360	1.96%	127	0.69%	3,296	17.97%	18,345
Jackson	32,873	56.23%	24,726	42.30%	614	1.05%	244	0.42%	8,147	13.93%	58,457
Kalamazoo	51,462	59.09%	33,411	38.37%	1,858	2.13%	354	0.41%	18,051	20.72%	87,085
Kalkaska	2,280	53.13%	1,957	45.61%	40	0.93%	14	0.33%	323	7.52%	4,291
Kent	126,805	67.22%	59,000	31.28%	2,161	1.15%	667	0.35%	67,805	35.94%	188,633
Keweenaw	606	47.68%	658	51.77%	6	0.47%	1	0.08%	-52	-4.09%	1,271
Lake	1,598	41.96%	2,179	57.22%	23	0.60%	8	0.21%	-581	-15.26%	3,808
Lapeer	12,349	55.59%	9,503	42.78%	248	1.12%	115	0.52%	2,846	12.81%	22,215
Leelanau	4,240	62.33%	2,437	35.82%	96	1.41%	30	0.44%	1,803	26.51%	6,803
Lenawee	18,397	55.02%	14,610	43.70%	343	1.03%	85	0.25%	3,787	11.32%	33,435
Livingston	19,437	59.83%	12,415	38.22%	479	1.47%	155	0.48%	7,022	21.61%	32,486
Luce	1,379	55.27%	1,099	44.05%	12	0.48%	5	0.20%	280	11.22%	2,495
Mackinac	3,107	55.22%	2,452	43.58%	53	0.94%	15	0.27%	655	11.64%	5,627
Macomb	132,499	51.24%	121,176	46.86%	3,898	1.51%	1,030	0.40%	11,323	4.38%	258,603
Manistee	5,532	54.59%	4,479	44.20%	96	0.95%	27	0.27%	1,053	10.39%	10,134
Marquette	12,984	49.34%	12,837	48.78%	393	1.49%	101	0.38%	147	0.56%	26,315
Mason	6,812	59.15%	4,541	39.43%	124	1.08%	39	0.34%	2,271	19.72%	11,516
Mecosta	7,287	59.63%	4,725	38.66%	166	1.36%	43	0.35%	2,562	20.97%	12,221
Menominee	5,633	49.60%	5,596	49.27%	96	0.85%	32	0.28%	37	0.33%	11,357
Midland	17,631	58.57%	11,959	39.73%	358	1.19%	153	0.51%	5,672	18.84%	30,101
Missaukee	2,943	62.87%	1,688	36.06%	30	0.64%	20	0.43%	1,255	26.81%	4,681
Monroe	20,676	46.36%	23,290	52.22%	486	1.09%	145	0.33%	-2,614	-5.86%	44,597
Montcalm	10,439	60.36%	6,684	38.65%	131	0.76%	40	0.23%	3,755	21.71%	17,294
Montmorency	1,882	52.03%	1,684	46.56%	37	1.02%	14	0.39%	198	5.47%	3,617
Muskegon	35,548	56.06%	27,013	42.60%	627	0.99%	219	0.35%	8,535	13.46%	63,407
Newaygo	8,258	58.78%	5,622	40.01%	129	0.92%	41	0.29%	2,636	18.77%	14,050
Oakland	244,271	58.69%	164,266	39.47%	5,924	1.42%	1,744	0.42%	80,005	19.22%	416,205
Oceana	5,236	59.51%	3,427	38.95%	93	1.06%	42	0.48%	1,809	20.56%	8,798
Ogemaw	3,212	47.07%	3,545	51.95%	53	0.78%	14	0.21%	-333	-4.88%	6,824
Ontonagon	2,462	43.91%	3,104	55.36%	31	0.55%	10	0.18%	-642	-11.45%	5,607
Osceola	4,467	62.23%	2,603	36.26%	59	0.82%	49	0.68%	1,864	25.97%	7,178
Oscoda	1,541	57.56%	1,108	41.39%	24	0.90%	4	0.15%	433	16.17%	2,677
Otsego	3,155	53.01%	2,724	45.77%	56	0.94%	17	0.29%	431	7.24%	5,952
Ottawa	49,196	74.12%	16,381	24.68%	624	0.94%	169	0.25%	32,815	49.44%	66,370
Presque Isle	3,545	51.02%	3,334	47.99%	53	0.76%	16	0.23%	211	3.03%	6,948
Roscommon	4,608	54.85%	3,691	43.94%	84	1.00%	18	0.21%	917	10.91%	8,401
Saginaw	46,765	55.63%	36,280	43.15%	764	0.91%	262	0.31%	10,485	12.48%	84,071
Sanilac	10,597	62.87%	6,042	35.84%	165	0.98%	52	0.31%	4,555	27.03%	16,856
Schoolcraft	1,933	46.53%	2,158	51.95%	49	1.18%	14	0.34%	-225	-5.42%	4,154
Shiawassee	15,113	54.52%	12,202	44.02%	291	1.05%	115	0.41%	2,911	10.50%	27,721
St. Clair	26,311	52.74%	22,734	45.57%	636	1.27%	208	0.42%	3,577	7.17%	49,889
St. Joseph	11,784	61.07%	7,306	37.86%	148	0.77%	57	0.30%	4,478	23.21%	19,295
Tuscola	12,059	59.86%	7,932	39.38%	108	0.54%	45	0.22%	4,127	20.48%	20,144
Van Buren	13,615	56.02%	10,366	42.65%	255	1.05%	66	0.27%	3,249	13.37%	24,302
Washtenaw	56,807	50.86%	50,917	45.59%	2,965	2.65%	1,000	0.90%	5,890	5.27%	111,689
Wayne	348,588	38.18%	548,767	60.11%	11,594	1.27%	4,041	0.44%	-200,179	-21.93%	912,990
Wexford	5,670	54.96%	4,519	43.80%	104	1.01%	24	0.23%	1,151	11.16%	10,317
Totals	1,893,742	51.83%	1,696,714	46.44%	47,905	1.31%	15,388	0.42%	197,028	5.39%	3,653,749

===== Counties that flipped from Republican to Democratic =====
- Alger
- Arenac
- Bay
- Dickinson
- Genesee
- Gogebic
- Iron
- Keweenaw
- Monroe
- Ogemaw
- Ontonagon
- Schoolcraft

===== Counties that flipped from Democratic to Republican =====
- Washtenaw

==== By congressional district ====
Ford won 14 out of the state's 19 congressional districts, including 6 which elected Democrats.

District	Ford	Carter	Representative
1st	9.4%	90.6%	John Conyers
2nd	54.6%	45.4%	Carl Pursell
3rd	59.9%	40.1%	Garry E. Brown
4th	59.2%	40.8%	David Stockman
5th	67.8%	32.2%	Harold S. Sawyer
6th	58.6%	41.3%	Bob Carr
7th	47.7%	52.3%	Dale Kildee
8th	55.5%	44.5%	J. Bob Traxler
9th	64.1%	35.9%	Guy Vander Jagt
10th	58.9%	41.1%	Al Cederberg
11th	51.2%	48.8%	Philip Ruppe
12th	54.3%	45.7%	David Bonior
13th	11.4%	88.6%	Charles Diggs
14th	51.4%	48.6%	Lucien Nedzi
15th	47.2%	52.8%	William D. Ford
16th	44.7%	55.3%	John Dingell
17th	50.2%	49.8%	William M. Brodhead
18th	53.9%	46.1%	James J. Blanchard
19th	63.2%	36.8%	William Broomfield

== See also ==
- United States presidential elections in Michigan
