= 1992 United States presidential election in Michigan =

- November 3, 1992
- Turnout: 62.5% ▲

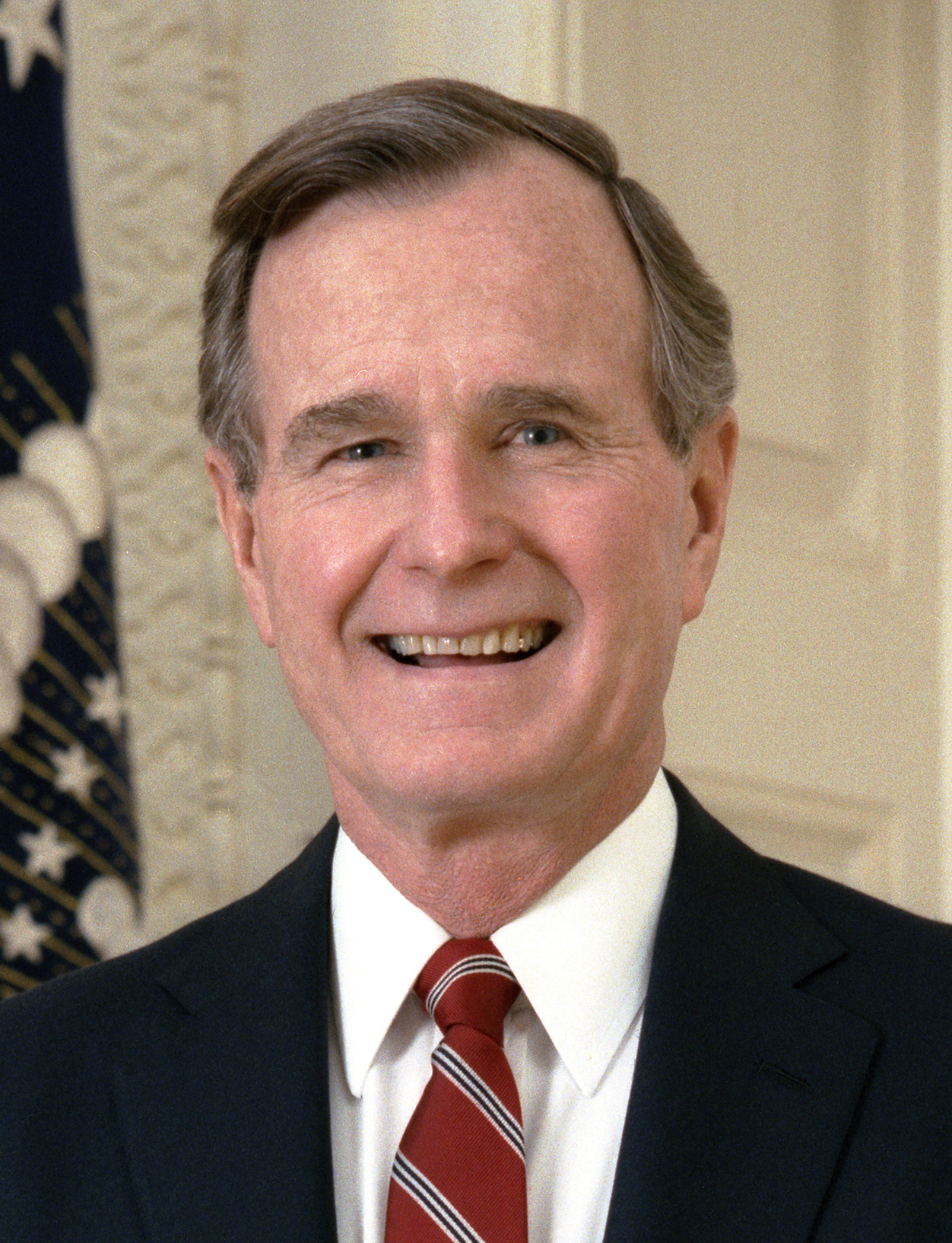

Nominee	Bill Clinton	George H. W. Bush	Ross Perot
Party	Democratic	Republican	Independent
Home state	Arkansas	Texas	Texas
Running mate	Al Gore	Dan Quayle	James Stockdale
Electoral vote	18	0	0
Popular vote	1,871,182	1,554,940	824,813
Percentage	43.77%	36.38%	19.30%

Clinton
30–40%
40–50%
50–60%
60–70%
70–80%
80–90%
Bush
30–40%
40–50%
50–60%
President before election
George H. W. Bush
Republican
Elected President
Bill Clinton
Democratic

The 1992 United States presidential election in Michigan took place on November 3, 1992, as part of the 1992 United States presidential election. Voters chose 18 representatives, or electors to the Electoral College, who voted for president and vice president.

Michigan was won by Governor Bill Clinton (D–Arkansas), with 43.77% of the popular vote, over incumbent president George H. W. Bush (R–Texas), with 36.38%. Businessman Ross Perot (I–Texas) finished in third, with 19.30% of the popular vote. Clinton ultimately won the national vote, defeating incumbent president Bush. This was the first time that a Democratic presidential candidate carried the state since Hubert Humphrey in 1968. It would not vote Republican again until 2016.

As of the 2024 presidential election, this is the last time that Oakland County voted for a Republican presidential candidate and the last time that Charlevoix County voted for a Democratic presidential candidate. Michigan voted most similarly to the national results of the election.

This is the most recent election where Michigan voted more Republican than nearby Pennsylvania. Afterwards, Michigan would become the most Democratic of the three Rust Belt swing states (including Wisconsin and Pennsylvania) until 2024.

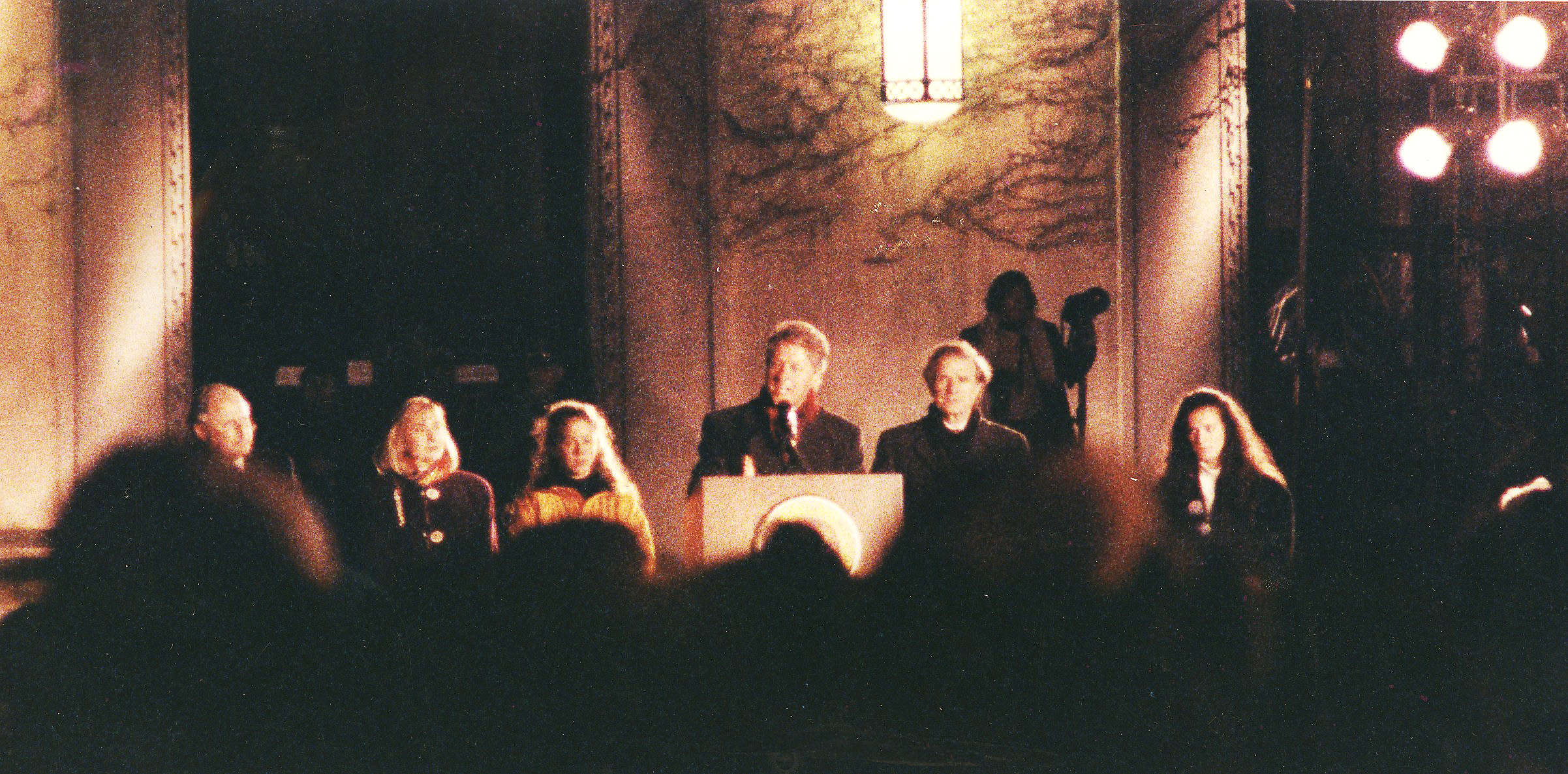
Clinton on campaign. Seen here with local Democratic notables in front of Rackham School at the University of Michigan in October 1992.

== Primaries ==
The presidential primary in Michigan was held on March 17, 1992. Bill Clinton won the Democratic primary. Jerry Brown came in second place, ahead of Paul Tsongas. George H. W. Bush won the Republican primary with around 67% of the vote. Pat Buchanan won 25% of the vote and David Duke won 3%.

== Results ==
1992 United States presidential election in Michigan
Party	Candidate	Votes	%
Democratic	Bill Clinton	1,871,182	43.77%
Republican	George H. W. Bush (inc.)	1,554,940	36.38%
Independent	Ross Perot	824,813	19.30%
Libertarian	Andre Marrou	10,175	0.24%
Tisch (Note: Although a candidate for the national Taxpayers’ Party, Phillips was listed on the Michigan ballot as a candidate for the “Tisch Independent Citizens” party.)	Howard Phillips	8,263	0.19%
Natural Law	John Hagelin	2,954	0.07%
Workers League	Helen Halyard	1,432	0.03%
Independent	Bo Gritz (write-in)	168	0.00%
Independent	Lenora Fulani (write-in)	21	0.00%
Independent	Lyndon LaRouche (write-in)	14	0.00%
Write-ins	Scattering	711	0.02%
Total votes		4,274,673	100.00%

=== Results by county ===
County	Bill Clinton Democratic		George H. W. Bush Republican		Ross Perot Independent		Various candidates Other parties		Margin		Total votes cast
County	#	%	#	%	#	%	#	%	#	%	Total votes cast
Alcona	2,383	41.24%	2,247	38.88%	1,117	19.33%	32	0.55%	136	2.36%	5,779
Alger	2,144	46.91%	1,471	32.19%	941	20.59%	14	0.31%	673	14.72%	4,570
Allegan	12,823	31.40%	19,077	46.72%	8,742	21.41%	193	0.47%	-6,254	-15.32%	40,835
Alpena	6,894	45.75%	4,878	32.37%	3,236	21.47%	61	0.40%	2,016	13.38%	15,069
Antrim	3,431	34.34%	3,984	39.88%	2,528	25.30%	48	0.48%	-553	-5.54%	9,991
Arenac	3,244	45.02%	2,330	32.33%	1,608	22.31%	24	0.33%	914	12.69%	7,206
Baraga	1,695	46.69%	1,160	31.96%	754	20.77%	21	0.58%	535	14.73%	3,630
Barry	8,652	35.17%	9,489	38.57%	6,303	25.62%	155	0.63%	-837	-3.40%	24,599
Bay	26,492	48.74%	16,383	30.14%	11,258	20.71%	222	0.41%	10,109	18.60%	54,355
Benzie	2,715	39.62%	2,438	35.58%	1,657	24.18%	42	0.61%	277	4.04%	6,852
Berrien	25,840	37.12%	29,252	42.02%	14,056	20.19%	467	0.67%	-3,412	-4.90%	69,615
Branch	5,850	35.26%	5,976	36.02%	4,683	28.22%	84	0.51%	-126	-0.76%	16,593
Calhoun	25,542	43.51%	19,791	33.71%	13,058	22.24%	311	0.53%	5,751	9.80%	58,702
Cass	8,047	39.67%	7,391	36.44%	4,756	23.45%	89	0.44%	656	3.23%	20,283
Charlevoix	4,063	35.25%	4,017	34.85%	3,360	29.15%	85	0.74%	46	0.40%	11,525
Cheboygan	4,459	41.04%	3,864	35.57%	2,495	22.97%	46	0.42%	595	5.47%	10,864
Chippewa	5,434	39.82%	5,462	40.02%	2,706	19.83%	45	0.33%	-28	-0.20%	13,647
Clare	5,346	43.95%	3,916	32.20%	2,812	23.12%	89	0.73%	1,430	11.75%	12,163
Clinton	10,116	33.34%	12,216	40.27%	7,877	25.96%	130	0.43%	-2,100	-6.93%	30,339
Crawford	2,252	38.01%	2,193	37.01%	1,442	24.34%	38	0.64%	59	1.00%	5,925
Delta	8,387	46.69%	6,027	33.55%	3,485	19.40%	63	0.35%	2,360	13.14%	17,962
Dickinson	5,689	43.66%	4,273	32.79%	3,022	23.19%	47	0.36%	1,416	10.87%	13,031
Eaton	16,752	34.99%	18,669	38.99%	12,208	25.50%	254	0.53%	-1,917	-4.00%	47,883
Emmet	4,245	32.08%	5,312	40.15%	3,576	27.03%	99	0.75%	-1,067	-8.07%	13,232
Genesee	105,156	52.58%	47,834	23.92%	46,259	23.13%	749	0.37%	57,322	28.66%	199,998
Gladwin	4,457	41.36%	3,616	33.56%	2,649	24.58%	54	0.50%	841	7.80%	10,776
Gogebic	4,792	51.95%	2,838	30.76%	1,543	16.73%	52	0.56%	1,954	21.19%	9,225
Grand Traverse	11,148	32.35%	13,629	39.55%	9,495	27.55%	189	0.55%	-2,481	-7.20%	34,461
Gratiot	5,678	35.76%	6,280	39.55%	3,866	24.35%	55	0.35%	-602	-3.79%	15,879
Hillsdale	5,244	29.31%	7,579	42.36%	4,968	27.77%	100	0.56%	-2,335	-13.05%	17,891
Houghton	6,558	43.22%	5,575	36.74%	2,945	19.41%	95	0.63%	983	6.48%	15,173
Huron	6,023	36.21%	6,491	39.03%	4,064	24.43%	54	0.32%	-468	-2.82%	16,632
Ingham	61,596	46.04%	43,926	32.83%	27,683	20.69%	587	0.44%	17,670	13.21%	133,792
Ionia	8,370	35.14%	9,135	38.35%	6,211	26.07%	106	0.44%	-765	-3.21%	23,822
Iosco	5,369	39.79%	4,912	36.41%	3,131	23.21%	80	0.59%	457	3.38%	13,492
Iron	3,648	52.11%	1,971	28.16%	1,344	19.20%	37	0.53%	1,677	23.95%	7,000
Isabella	8,784	39.86%	7,706	34.97%	5,434	24.66%	113	0.51%	1,078	4.89%	22,037
Jackson	23,686	36.64%	25,424	39.33%	15,194	23.50%	340	0.53%	-1,738	-2.69%	64,644
Kalamazoo	43,568	41.95%	38,035	36.62%	21,666	20.86%	589	0.57%	5,533	5.33%	103,858
Kalkaska	2,297	35.75%	2,173	33.82%	1,915	29.80%	41	0.64%	124	1.93%	6,426
Kent	82,305	33.93%	115,285	47.53%	43,707	18.02%	1,256	0.52%	-32,980	-13.60%	242,553
Keweenaw	582	49.62%	378	32.23%	212	18.07%	1	0.09%	204	17.39%	1,173
Lake	2,351	51.72%	1,194	26.26%	981	21.58%	20	0.44%	1,157	25.46%	4,546
Lapeer	11,982	34.15%	12,326	35.13%	10,541	30.05%	235	0.67%	-344	-0.98%	35,084
Leelanau	3,445	33.82%	3,993	39.20%	2,685	26.36%	64	0.63%	-548	-5.38%	10,187
Lenawee	15,399	39.12%	14,297	36.32%	9,517	24.18%	152	0.39%	1,102	2.80%	39,365
Livingston	17,851	28.92%	27,539	44.61%	15,971	25.87%	374	0.61%	-9,688	-15.69%	61,735
Luce	972	37.34%	958	36.80%	660	25.36%	13	0.50%	14	0.54%	2,603
Mackinac	2,293	38.36%	2,278	38.11%	1,379	23.07%	27	0.45%	15	0.25%	5,977
Macomb	130,732	37.43%	147,795	42.32%	67,954	19.46%	2,757	0.79%	-17,063	-4.89%	349,238
Manistee	5,193	44.57%	3,491	29.96%	2,923	25.09%	44	0.38%	1,702	14.61%	11,651
Marquette	16,038	50.71%	9,665	30.56%	5,768	18.24%	158	0.50%	6,373	20.15%	31,629
Mason	4,829	36.91%	5,102	39.00%	3,096	23.67%	55	0.42%	-273	-2.09%	13,082
Mecosta	6,097	38.50%	6,047	38.19%	3,612	22.81%	79	0.50%	50	0.31%	15,835
Menominee	4,559	41.14%	3,995	36.05%	2,487	22.44%	41	0.37%	564	5.09%	11,082
Midland	13,382	34.65%	16,149	41.81%	8,945	23.16%	148	0.38%	-2,767	-7.16%	38,624
Missaukee	1,893	31.25%	2,829	46.70%	1,306	21.56%	30	0.50%	-936	-15.45%	6,058
Monroe	24,957	42.28%	20,250	34.30%	13,551	22.96%	273	0.46%	4,707	7.98%	59,031
Montcalm	8,730	38.32%	8,420	36.96%	5,504	24.16%	126	0.55%	310	1.36%	22,780
Montmorency	1,903	39.72%	1,794	37.45%	1,077	22.48%	17	0.35%	109	2.27%	4,791
Muskegon	32,515	45.19%	23,769	33.04%	15,268	21.22%	396	0.55%	8,746	12.15%	71,948
Newaygo	6,455	36.03%	7,333	40.93%	4,056	22.64%	72	0.40%	-878	-4.90%	17,916
Oakland	214,733	38.64%	242,160	43.57%	94,911	17.08%	3,956	0.71%	-27,427	-4.93%	555,760
Oceana	3,846	36.43%	3,944	37.36%	2,713	25.70%	54	0.51%	-98	-0.93%	10,557
Ogemaw	4,016	44.01%	2,936	32.17%	2,122	23.25%	52	0.57%	1,080	11.84%	9,126
Ontonagon	2,451	51.65%	1,463	30.83%	805	16.97%	26	0.55%	988	20.82%	4,745
Osceola	3,529	37.64%	3,606	38.46%	2,199	23.45%	42	0.45%	-77	-0.82%	9,376
Oscoda	1,471	38.40%	1,583	41.32%	755	19.71%	22	0.57%	-112	-2.92%	3,831
Otsego	3,129	33.99%	3,393	36.85%	2,635	28.62%	50	0.54%	-264	-2.86%	9,207
Ottawa	22,180	23.05%	56,862	59.10%	16,855	17.52%	314	0.33%	-34,682	-36.05%	96,211
Presque Isle	3,308	45.04%	2,398	32.65%	1,612	21.95%	27	0.37%	910	12.39%	7,345
Roscommon	5,243	43.67%	4,170	34.73%	2,551	21.25%	43	0.36%	1,073	8.94%	12,007
Saginaw	43,819	45.22%	32,103	33.13%	20,523	21.18%	460	0.47%	11,716	12.09%	96,905
Sanilac	5,868	31.28%	7,891	42.07%	4,894	26.09%	105	0.56%	-2,023	-10.79%	18,758
Schoolcraft	2,139	51.80%	1,253	30.35%	721	17.46%	16	0.39%	886	21.45%	4,129
Shiawassee	12,629	39.03%	10,930	33.78%	8,632	26.67%	169	0.52%	1,699	5.25%	32,360
St. Clair	23,385	34.99%	24,508	36.67%	18,523	27.72%	416	0.62%	-1,123	-1.68%	66,832
St. Joseph	7,817	32.61%	9,836	41.03%	6,209	25.90%	109	0.45%	-2,019	-8.42%	23,971
Tuscola	9,138	37.05%	8,636	35.01%	6,765	27.43%	127	0.51%	502	2.04%	24,666
Van Buren	12,466	41.23%	10,357	34.25%	7,255	23.99%	159	0.53%	2,109	6.98%	30,237
Washtenaw	73,325	53.34%	41,386	30.11%	21,889	15.92%	866	0.63%	31,939	23.23%	137,466
Wayne	508,464	60.39%	227,002	26.96%	102,074	12.12%	4,425	0.53%	281,462	33.43%	841,965
Wexford	4,894	38.92%	4,696	37.34%	2,923	23.24%	62	0.49%	198	1.58%	12,575
Totals	1,871,182	43.77%	1,554,940	36.38%	824,813	19.30%	23,738	0.56%	316,242	7.39%	4,274,673

==== Counties that flipped from Republican to Democratic ====
- Alcona
- Alpena
- Benzie
- Calhoun
- Cass
- Charlevoix
- Cheboygan
- Clare
- Crawford
- Dickinson
- Gladwin
- Houghton
- Ingham
- Iosco
- Isabella
- Kalamazoo
- Kalkaska
- Lenawee
- Luce
- Mackinac
- Manistee
- Mecosta
- Menominee
- Monroe
- Montcalm
- Montmorency
- Muskegon
- Ogemaw
- Presque Isle
- Roscommon
- Shiawassee
- Tuscola
- Van Buren
- Wexford

== See also ==
- Presidency of Bill Clinton
- United States presidential elections in Michigan
