= 1984 United States presidential election in Michigan =

- November 6, 1984

All 20 Michigan votes to the Electoral College
- Turnout: 59.3% ▼

Nominee	Ronald Reagan	Walter Mondale
Party	Republican	Democratic
Home state	California	Minnesota
Running mate	George H. W. Bush	Geraldine Ferraro
Electoral vote	20	0
Popular vote	2,251,571	1,529,638
Percentage	59.23%	40.24%

Reagan
40–50%
50–60%
60–70%
70–80%
Mondale
50–60%
80–90%
President before election
Ronald Reagan
Republican
Elected President
Ronald Reagan
Republican

The 1984 United States presidential election in Michigan took place on November 6, 1984. All 50 states and the District of Columbia participated in the 1984 United States presidential election. Voters chose 20 electors to the Electoral College, which selected the president and vice president of the United States. Michigan was won by incumbent United States president Ronald Reagan of California, who was running against former vice president Walter Mondale of Minnesota. Reagan ran for a second time with Vice President George H. W. Bush of Texas, and Mondale ran with Representative Geraldine Ferraro of New York, the first major female candidate for the vice presidency.

The presidential election of 1984 was a very partisan election for Michigan, with just over 99% of the electorate voting either Democratic or Republican, though several more parties appeared on the ballot. All but five counties gave Reagan a majority; one (Marquette) gave him a plurality. Mondale carried just four counties, all with a majority: Wayne County (home of Detroit) and tiny Iron, Keweenaw, and Gogebic Counties, all in the Upper Peninsula, a region then typified by heavy unionization and the mining industry. Michigan weighed in for this election as 0.77% more Republican than the nation at large. As of the 2024 presidential election, this is the last election in which Washtenaw, Genesee, and Marquette counties voted for a Republican presidential candidate. Bay, Saginaw, and Lake Counties would not vote Republican again until Donald Trump flipped them in 2016. Arenac County would not vote Republican again until 2012.

Reagan won the election in Michigan with a decisive 19% landslide, marginally more than the national popular vote. He performed particularly strongly in suburban Oakland County, which he won by over 100,000 raw votes, but he performed strongly almost throughout Michigan's Lower Peninsula (home to the vast majority of its population), including most of its major population centers aside from Wayne County: Oakland, Macomb (Warren), Kent (Grand Rapids), Genesee (Flint), Ingham (Lansing), Washtenaw (Ann Arbor), Kalamazoo (Kalamazoo), and Saginaw (Saginaw) all gave Reagan majorities. No nominee had carried so few counties in Michigan's Lower Peninsula since 1952—as Adlai Stevenson had carried Macomb as well as Wayne in 1956; Barry Goldwater had carried three counties in the Lower Peninsula in 1964; and even George McGovern had carried Washtenaw and Lake, in addition to Wayne, in 1972.

Unlike Pennsylvania and some of the other Upper Midwest states, there were few signs in 1984 of Michigan's imminent transition to becoming part of the "blue wall" from 1992 through 2012. Whereas in some other states, Reagan either lost or only narrowly won working-class areas, he scored powerful wins in Macomb and Saginaw Counties. There were also few rural Democratic redoubts in the state in 1984, unlike many other states.

Mondale made inroads elsewhere in the country in "cultural elite" counties including college counties, high-tech areas, and artists' colonies. (Note: As he flipped, Keweenaw County, Michigan, Marin County, California, Santa Cruz County, California, Tompkins County, New York, Arlington County, Virginia, Alexandria, Virginia, and Lane County, Oregon.) However, Washtenaw County, home to the University of Michigan, flipped against Mondale, despite having voted even for McGovern in 1972. And, as elsewhere, Reagan scored heavily in the state's affluent suburbs particularly concentrated in Oakland County. In 1988, Michigan would continue its run of voting more Republican than the nation, although this time only slightly more so, before turning blue for six elections straight in 1992. This is the last election where Michigan voted more Republican than Ohio or Tennessee.

Reagan was the last Republican candidate to win Michigan twice until Donald Trump did so in 2016 and 2024. He also remains the last Republican candidate to win the state in two consecutive elections.

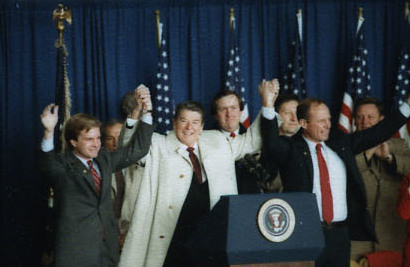
Reagan campaigning in Saginaw, Michigan, with congressional candidate and future Michigan Attorney General Bill Schuette and U.S. Senate candidate Jack Lousma

== Results ==
1984 United States presidential election in Michigan
Party	Candidate	Votes	%
Republican	Ronald Reagan (inc.)	2,251,571	59.23%
Democratic	Walter Mondale	1,529,638	40.24%
Libertarian	David Bergland	10,055	0.26%
Independent	Lyndon LaRouche	3,862	0.10%
Workers World	Larry Holmes	1,416	0.04%
Independent (Note: Affiliated with the Citizen's Party nationally but listed as Independent on the ballot in Michigan.)	Sonia Johnson	1,191	0.03%
Socialist Workers	Melvin Mason	1,049	0.03%
Communist	Gus Hall	1,048	0.03%
Independent (Note: Affiliated with the New Alliance Party nationally but listed as Independent on the ballot in Michigan.)	Dennis Serrette	665	0.02%
Workers League	Edward Winn	561	0.01%
Write-ins	Scattering	602	0.02%
Total votes		3,801,658	100.00%

=== Results by county ===
County	Ronald Reagan Republican		Walter Mondale Democratic		Various candidates Other parties		Margin		Total votes cast
County	#	%	#	%	#	%	#	%	Total votes cast
Alcona	3,223	66.41%	1,616	33.30%	14	0.29%	1,607	33.11%	4,853
Alger	2,175	51.69%	2,018	47.96%	15	0.36%	157	3.73%	4,208
Allegan	23,762	73.48%	8,389	25.94%	187	0.58%	15,373	47.54%	32,338
Alpena	8,212	61.30%	5,136	38.34%	49	0.37%	3,076	22.96%	13,397
Antrim	5,726	69.18%	2,507	30.29%	44	0.53%	3,219	38.89%	8,277
Arenac	3,483	58.63%	2,436	41.00%	22	0.37%	1,047	17.63%	5,941
Baraga	1,965	51.82%	1,818	47.94%	9	0.24%	147	3.88%	3,792
Barry	14,245	69.98%	5,989	29.42%	122	0.60%	8,256	40.56%	20,356
Bay	26,198	53.43%	22,597	46.09%	235	0.48%	3,601	7.34%	49,030
Benzie	3,590	65.25%	1,866	33.91%	46	0.84%	1,724	31.34%	5,502
Berrien	43,160	66.58%	21,228	32.75%	436	0.67%	21,932	33.83%	64,824
Branch	11,004	73.63%	3,860	25.83%	81	0.54%	7,144	47.80%	14,945
Calhoun	34,470	62.60%	20,313	36.89%	284	0.52%	14,157	25.71%	55,067
Cass	11,647	63.32%	6,634	36.07%	113	0.61%	5,013	27.25%	18,394
Charlevoix	6,355	66.23%	3,175	33.09%	65	0.68%	3,180	33.14%	9,595
Cheboygan	6,053	64.04%	3,358	35.53%	41	0.43%	2,695	28.51%	9,452
Chippewa	8,135	63.77%	4,575	35.86%	47	0.37%	3,560	27.91%	12,757
Clare	6,587	63.26%	3,764	36.15%	61	0.59%	2,823	27.11%	10,412
Clinton	17,387	73.28%	6,226	26.24%	113	0.48%	11,161	47.04%	23,726
Crawford	3,303	67.46%	1,558	31.82%	35	0.71%	1,745	35.64%	4,896
Delta	8,952	52.84%	7,934	46.83%	56	0.33%	1,018	6.01%	16,942
Dickinson	6,880	54.91%	5,614	44.80%	36	0.29%	1,266	10.11%	12,530
Eaton	27,720	72.57%	10,290	26.94%	189	0.49%	17,430	45.63%	38,199
Emmet	7,760	70.04%	3,254	29.37%	66	0.60%	4,506	40.67%	11,080
Genesee	92,943	50.68%	89,491	48.80%	953	0.52%	3,452	1.88%	183,387
Gladwin	5,401	61.07%	3,368	38.08%	75	0.85%	2,033	22.99%	8,844
Gogebic	4,006	41.81%	5,554	57.97%	21	0.22%	-1,548	-16.16%	9,581
Grand Traverse	18,036	70.83%	7,271	28.55%	157	0.62%	10,765	42.28%	25,464
Gratiot	10,456	72.08%	4,000	27.57%	50	0.34%	6,456	44.51%	14,506
Hillsdale	12,063	76.50%	3,616	22.93%	89	0.56%	8,447	53.57%	15,768
Houghton	8,652	57.14%	6,434	42.49%	55	0.36%	2,218	14.65%	15,141
Huron	11,073	73.37%	3,966	26.28%	52	0.34%	7,107	47.09%	15,091
Ingham	68,753	59.23%	46,411	39.98%	919	0.79%	22,342	19.25%	116,083
Ionia	14,162	70.69%	5,735	28.62%	138	0.69%	8,427	42.07%	20,035
Iosco	7,907	66.99%	3,850	32.62%	47	0.40%	4,057	34.37%	11,804
Iron	3,468	49.15%	3,559	50.44%	29	0.41%	-91	-1.29%	7,056
Isabella	12,215	65.00%	6,435	34.24%	143	0.76%	5,780	30.76%	18,793
Jackson	40,133	68.27%	18,340	31.20%	312	0.53%	21,793	37.07%	58,785
Kalamazoo	58,327	63.82%	32,460	35.52%	601	0.66%	25,867	28.30%	91,388
Kalkaska	3,623	69.15%	1,595	30.44%	21	0.40%	2,028	38.71%	5,239
Kent	137,417	67.03%	66,238	32.31%	1,365	0.67%	71,179	34.72%	205,020
Keweenaw	599	48.82%	628	51.18%	0	0.00%	-29	-2.36%	1,227
Lake	2,125	53.09%	1,845	46.09%	33	0.82%	280	7.00%	4,003
Lapeer	19,222	70.67%	7,800	28.68%	178	0.65%	11,422	41.99%	27,200
Leelanau	5,356	67.62%	2,498	31.54%	67	0.85%	2,858	36.08%	7,921
Lenawee	22,409	66.70%	11,012	32.78%	176	0.52%	11,397	33.92%	33,597
Livingston	31,846	74.39%	10,720	25.04%	246	0.57%	21,126	49.35%	42,812
Luce	1,715	66.97%	833	32.53%	13	0.51%	882	34.44%	2,561
Mackinac	3,627	64.85%	1,949	34.85%	17	0.30%	1,678	30.00%	5,593
Macomb	194,300	66.20%	97,816	33.32%	1,409	0.48%	96,484	32.88%	293,525
Manistee	6,328	61.45%	3,917	38.04%	53	0.51%	2,411	23.41%	10,298
Marquette	14,196	49.98%	14,074	49.55%	132	0.46%	122	0.43%	28,402
Mason	8,202	67.83%	3,803	31.45%	87	0.72%	4,399	36.38%	12,092
Mecosta	9,023	68.66%	4,048	30.80%	71	0.54%	4,975	37.86%	13,142
Menominee	6,618	59.68%	4,425	39.90%	46	0.41%	2,193	19.78%	11,089
Midland	21,521	66.11%	10,769	33.08%	262	0.80%	10,752	33.03%	32,552
Missaukee	3,970	75.53%	1,256	23.90%	30	0.57%	2,714	51.63%	5,256
Monroe	29,419	59.69%	19,617	39.80%	251	0.51%	9,802	19.89%	49,287
Montcalm	13,109	70.14%	5,491	29.38%	89	0.48%	7,618	40.76%	18,689
Montmorency	2,913	67.54%	1,387	32.16%	13	0.30%	1,526	35.38%	4,313
Muskegon	39,355	60.67%	25,247	38.92%	261	0.40%	14,108	21.75%	64,863
Newaygo	10,636	69.95%	4,496	29.57%	73	0.48%	6,140	40.38%	15,205
Oakland	306,050	66.71%	150,286	32.76%	2,464	0.54%	155,764	33.95%	458,800
Oceana	6,405	68.69%	2,865	30.72%	55	0.59%	3,540	37.97%	9,325
Ogemaw	4,901	60.81%	3,132	38.86%	27	0.33%	1,769	21.95%	8,060
Ontonagon	2,464	50.95%	2,350	48.59%	22	0.45%	114	2.36%	4,836
Osceola	5,923	73.21%	2,127	26.29%	40	0.49%	3,796	46.92%	8,090
Oscoda	2,239	69.77%	951	29.64%	19	0.59%	1,288	40.13%	3,209
Otsego	4,639	68.27%	2,117	31.16%	39	0.57%	2,522	37.11%	6,795
Ottawa	60,142	79.69%	15,000	19.88%	326	0.43%	45,142	59.81%	75,468
Presque Isle	4,207	62.57%	2,481	36.90%	36	0.54%	1,726	25.67%	6,724
Roscommon	6,419	65.35%	3,359	34.20%	45	0.46%	3,060	31.15%	9,823
Saginaw	51,495	56.95%	38,420	42.49%	501	0.55%	13,075	14.46%	90,416
Sanilac	12,627	75.12%	4,126	24.54%	57	0.34%	8,501	50.58%	16,810
Schoolcraft	2,139	52.47%	1,920	47.09%	18	0.44%	219	5.38%	4,077
Shiawassee	18,756	65.97%	9,514	33.46%	161	0.57%	9,242	32.51%	28,431
St. Clair	36,114	67.63%	16,998	31.83%	287	0.54%	19,116	35.80%	53,399
St. Joseph	15,405	72.34%	5,795	27.21%	96	0.45%	9,610	45.13%	21,296
Tuscola	14,698	70.01%	6,212	29.59%	83	0.40%	8,486	40.42%	20,993
Van Buren	16,426	64.55%	8,853	34.79%	166	0.65%	7,573	29.76%	25,445
Washtenaw	58,736	51.27%	55,084	48.08%	749	0.65%	3,652	3.19%	114,569
Wayne	367,391	42.31%	496,632	57.19%	4,320	0.50%	-129,241	-14.88%	868,343
Wexford	7,279	67.93%	3,398	31.71%	38	0.35%	3,881	36.22%	10,715
Totals	2,251,571	59.23%	1,529,638	40.24%	20,449	0.53%	721,933	18.99%	3,801,658

==== Counties that flipped from Democratic to Republican ====
- Alger
- Delta
- Genesee
- Lake
- Marquette
- Washtenaw

==== Counties that flipped Republican to Democratic ====
- Keweenaw

== See also ==
- Presidency of Ronald Reagan
- United States presidential elections in Michigan
