= 2024 United States presidential election in Michigan =

- November 5, 2024
- Turnout: 77.9% (▲6.5 pp)

Nominee	Donald Trump	Kamala Harris
Party	Republican	Democratic
Home state	Florida	California
Running mate	JD Vance	Tim Walz
Electoral vote	15	0
Popular vote	2,816,636	2,736,533
Percentage	49.73%	48.31%

Trump
30–40%
40–50%
50–60%
60–70%
70–80%
80–90%
90–100%
Harris
30–40%
40–50%
50–60%
60–70%
70–80%
80–90%
90–100%
Stein
30–40%
Tie/No data
President before election
Joe Biden
Democratic
Elected President
Donald Trump
Republican

The 2024 United States presidential election in Michigan took place on November 5, as part of the 2024 United States presidential election in which all 50 states plus the District of Columbia participated. Michigan voters chose electors for Donald Trump and JD Vance to represent them in the Electoral College via a popular vote. The state of Michigan has 15 electoral votes in the Electoral College, following reapportionment due to the 2020 United States census in which the state lost a seat.

Due to the state's nearly even partisan lean and the close margins by which it was decided in 2016 and 2020, it was considered to be one of the seven crucial swing states in 2024, though many viewed it as the most difficult of the seven for Trump to regain, even harder than Nevada, the only one of seven Trump never won in 2016 and 2020. However, contrary to polling data, Trump flipped Michigan back into the Republican column, defeating Kamala Harris by 1.42%. This made the state 0.06% more Democratic than the nation at-large and therefore the closest to the national results. Michigan shares with Pennsylvania and Wisconsin the longest active streak of voting for the winning presidential candidate, having done so in the last five presidential elections. Altogether, the three states have voted for the same candidate in nine consecutive elections, dating to 1992.

This was the first election since 2012 where Michigan voted more Democratic than the nation as a whole. It was also the first election since 1988 that Michigan voted more Republican than neighboring Wisconsin.

== Primary elections ==
=== Democratic primary ===
One key issue for the Democratic nominee was retaining the support of Arab-American voters, with polls indicating that they could be alienated by the Democrats due to their pro-Israel policy.

The Michigan Democratic primary was held on February 27, 2024, as one of the earliest races of the larger Democratic primaries. Incumbent president Joe Biden won in a landslide, although he would lose two delegates and over 100,000 votes to the uncommitted option, which was fueled by pro-Palestine protest votes opposing Biden's campaign due to his handling of the Gaza war.

Popular vote share by county Biden: 70–80%; 80–90%

2024 Michigan Democratic primary
Candidate	Votes	%	Delegates
Joe Biden (incumbent)	625,221	81.14	115
Uncommitted	101,623	13.19	2
Marianne Williamson (withdrawn)	22,865	2.97	0
Dean Phillips	20,684	2.68	0
Write-in votes	178	0.02	—
Total	770,571	100%	117

=== Republican primary ===
Following a schism in the state Republican Party, Michigan held two Republican nominating contests. The primary was held on February 27, 2024, and awarded a small amount of delegates to former president Donald Trump, who won in a landslide, and former UN ambassador Nikki Haley. The party later held a caucus on March 2, in which Trump won the remainder of delegates.

Popular vote share by county Trump: 50–60%; 60–70%; 70–80%; 80–90%

Michigan Republican primary, February 27, 2024
Candidate	Votes	Percentage	Actual delegate count		
Candidate	Votes	Percentage	Bound	Unbound	Total
Donald Trump	761,163	68.12%	12	0	12
Nikki Haley	297,124	26.59%	4	0	4
Uncommitted	33,649	3.01%	0	0	0
Ron DeSantis (withdrawn)	13,456	1.20%	0	0	0
Chris Christie (withdrawn)	4,794	0.43%	0	0	0
Vivek Ramaswamy (withdrawn)	3,702	0.33%	0	0	0
Ryan Binkley	2,348	0.21%	0	0	0
Asa Hutchinson (withdrawn)	1,077	0.10%	0	0	0
Total:	1,117,313	100.00%	16	0	16

Michigan Republican caucus, March 2, 2024
Candidate	Votes	Percentage	Actual delegate count		
Candidate	Votes	Percentage	Bound	Unbound	Total
Donald Trump	1,575	97.77%	39	0	39
Nikki Haley	36	2.23%	0	0	0
Total:	1,611	100.00%	39	0	39

== General election ==
=== Candidates ===
The following candidates had qualified for the general election ballot:

- Kamala Harris — Democratic
- Donald Trump — Republican
- Chase Oliver — Libertarian
- Randall Terry — US Taxpayers
- Jill Stein — Green
- Robert F. Kennedy Jr. — Natural Law (Note: Candidate had suspended campaign, but remained on the ballot.)
- Joseph Kishore — Independent (Socialist Equality Party nominee)
- Cornel West — Independent

On April 18, 2024, Robert F. Kennedy Jr. was nominated by Michigan's Natural Law Party. Despite suspending his campaign on August 23 and legal attempts to withdraw himself, the Michigan Supreme Court ruled that his name would remain on the ballot. Jill Stein from the Green Party also appeared on the ballot.

Additionally, voters had the option to write-in candidates who file a letter of intent by October 25.

=== Predictions ===
Source	Ranking	As of
The Cook Political Report	Tossup	November 4, 2024
Sabato's Crystal Ball	Lean D	November 4, 2024
Decision Desk HQ/The Hill	Tossup	November 4, 2024
CNN	Tossup	November 4, 2024
CNalysis	Likely D	November 4, 2024
The Economist	Lean D	November 5, 2024
538	Lean D	November 4, 2024
Inside Elections	Tossup	November 4, 2024
NBC News	Tossup	November 4, 2024

=== Polling ===
Kamala Harris vs. Donald Trump Aggregate polls

Source of poll aggregation	Dates administered	Dates updated	Kamala Harris Democratic	Donald Trump Republican	Other / Undecided (Note: Calculated by taking the difference of 100% and all other candidates combined.)	Margin
270ToWin	October 23 – November 4, 2024	November 4, 2024	48.6%	46.8%	4.6%	Harris +1.8%
538	through November 4, 2024	November 4, 2024	48.0%	47.0%	5.0%	Harris +1.0%
Silver Bulletin	through November 4, 2024	November 4, 2024	48.4%	47.2%	4.4%	Harris +1.2%
The Hill/DDHQ	through November 4, 2024	November 4, 2024	48.7%	48.3%	3.0%	Harris +0.4%
Average			48.4%	47.3%	4.3%	Harris 1.1%

Poll source	Date(s) administered	Sample size (Note: Key: A – all adults RV – registered voters LV – likely voters V – unclear)	Margin of error	Kamala Harris Democratic	Donald Trump Republican	Other / Undecided
HarrisX	November 3–5, 2024	1,864 (RV)	± 2.3%	47%	46%	7%
HarrisX	November 3–5, 2024	1,864 (RV)	± 2.3%	50.1% (Note: With voters who lean towards a given candidate)	49.9%	–
HarrisX	November 3–5, 2024	1,668 (LV)	± 2.3%	48%	48%	4%
HarrisX	November 3–5, 2024	1,668 (LV)	± 2.3%	50.3%	49.7%	–
AtlasIntel	November 3–4, 2024	1,113 (LV)	± 3.0%	48%	50%	2%
Research Co.	November 2–3, 2024	450 (LV)	± 4.6%	49%	47%	4%
Trafalgar Group (R)	November 1–3, 2024	1,079 (LV)	± 2.9%	47%	48%	5% (Note: "Other" with 2%)
Patriot Polling	November 1–3, 2024	858 (RV)	± 3.0%	49%	49%	2%
InsiderAdvantage (R)	November 1–2, 2024	800 (LV)	± 3.7%	47%	47%	6% (Note: "Other" with 4%)
AtlasIntel	November 1–2, 2024	1,198 (LV)	± 3.0%	48%	50%	2%
Emerson College	October 30 – November 2, 2024	790 (LV)	± 3.4%	50%	48%	2% (Note: "Someone else" with 1%)
Emerson College	October 30 – November 2, 2024	790 (LV)	± 3.4%	51%	49%	–
Mitchell Research (Note: Poll commissioned by MIRS)	October 29 – November 2, 2024	585 (LV)	± 4.0%	50%	48%	2%
The New York Times/Siena College	October 29 – November 2, 2024	998 (RV)	± 3.5%	45%	45%	9%
The New York Times/Siena College	October 29 – November 2, 2024	998 (LV)	± 3.5%	47%	47%	6%
Mainstreet Research/Florida Atlantic University	October 25 – November 2, 2024	733 (RV)	± 3.6%	48%	46%	6% (Note: "Another Candidate" with 3%)
Mainstreet Research/Florida Atlantic University	October 25 – November 2, 2024	714 (LV)	± 3.6%	49%	47%	4% (Note: "Another Candidate" with 2%)
ActiVote	October 8 – November 2, 2024	400 (LV)	± 4.9%	50%	50%	–
Rasmussen Reports (R) (Note: Poll sponsored by American Thinker)	October 24 – November 1, 2024	908 (LV)	± 3.0%	49%	48%	3%
AtlasIntel	October 30–31, 2024	1,136 (LV)	± 3.0%	48.7%	49.3%	2%
OnMessage Inc. (R)	October 29–31, 2024	800 (LV)	–	48%	48%	4%
YouGov (Note: Poll conducted for The Times, Stanford University, Arizona State University, and Yale University)	October 25–31, 2024	985 (RV)	± 3.9%	50%	46%	4%
YouGov	October 25–31, 2024	942 (LV)	± 3.9%	50%	47%	3%
Morning Consult	October 22−31, 2024	1,108 (LV)	± 3.0%	49%	48%	3%
Marist College	October 27–30, 2024	1,356 (RV)	± 3.3%	51%	48%	1% (Note: Another Party's Candidate with 1%)
Marist College	October 27–30, 2024	1,214 (LV)	± 3.5%	51%	48%	1%
Echelon Insights	October 27–30, 2024	600 (LV)	± 4.4%	48%	48%	4%
Mitchell Research	October 28–29, 2024	– (LV)	± 2.5%	47%	48%	5%
AtlasIntel	October 25–29, 2024	938 (LV)	± 3.0%	48%	49%	3%
Quantus Insights (R) (Note: Poll sponsored by TrendingPolitics)	October 26–28, 2024	844 (LV)	± 3.4%	49%	49%	2%
The Washington Post	October 24–28, 2024	1,003 (RV)	± 3.7%	45%	47%	8%
The Washington Post	October 24–28, 2024	1,003 (LV)	± 3.7%	47%	46%	7%
Fox News	October 24–28, 2024	1,275 (RV)	± 2.5%	50%	48%	2%
Fox News	October 24–28, 2024	988 (LV)	± 3.0%	49%	49%	2%
InsiderAdvantage (R)	October 26–27, 2024	800 (LV)	± 3.7%	47%	48%	5% (Note: "Other" with 3%)
Emerson College (Note: Poll sponsored by RealClearWorld)	October 25–27, 2024	1,000 (LV)	± 3.0%	48%	49%	3%
Emerson College	October 25–27, 2024	1,000 (LV)	± 3.0%	49%	50%	1%
Susquehanna Polling & Research	October 23–27, 2024	400 (LV)	± 4.9%	52%	47%	1%
Patriot Polling	October 24–26, 2024	796 (RV)	± 3.0%	49%	50%	1%
CES/YouGov	October 1–25, 2024	2,347 (A)	–	52%	45%	3%
CES/YouGov	October 1–25, 2024	2,336 (LV)	–	51%	46%	3%
Quinnipiac University	October 17–21, 2024	1,136 (LV)	± 2.9%	50%	46%	4%
Trafalgar Group (R)	October 18−20, 2024	1,090 (LV)	± 2.9%	44%	46%	10%
Bloomberg/Morning Consult	October 16–20, 2024	756 (RV)	± 4.0%	48%	46%	6%
Bloomberg/Morning Consult	October 16–20, 2024	705 (LV)	± 4.0%	50%	46%	4%
The Bullfinch Group	October 11−18, 2024	600 (LV)	± 4.0%	53%	45%	2%
The Bullfinch Group	October 11−18, 2024	600 (LV)	± 4.0%	51%	43%	6% (Note: "A third party / Independent candidate" with 3%)
AtlasIntel	October 12–17, 2024	1,529 (LV)	± 3.0%	47%	50%	3%
RMG Research (Note: Poll sponsored by the Napolitan Institute)	October 10–16, 2024	789 (LV)	± 3.5%	48%	48%	4% (Note: "Some other candidate" with 2%)
RMG Research	October 10–16, 2024	789 (LV)	± 3.5%	49%	49%	2%
Morning Consult	October 6−15, 2024	1,065 (LV)	± 3.0%	49%	47%	4%
The Washington Post/Schar School	September 30 – October 15, 2024	687 (RV)	± 4.6%	46%	47%	7%
The Washington Post/Schar School	September 30 – October 15, 2024	687 (LV)	± 4.6%	49%	47%	4%
Mitchell Research	October 14, 2024	589 (LV)	± 4.0%	47%	48%	5%
Rasmussen Reports (R)	October 9–14, 2024	1,058 (LV)	± 3.0%	48%	48%	4%
SoCal Strategies (R) (Note: Poll sponsored by On Point Politics & Red Eagle Politics)	October 10–13, 2024	692 (LV)	± 3.7%	49%	48%	3%
Michigan State University/YouGov	September 23 – October 10, 2024	845 (LV)	–	52%	48%	–
InsiderAdvantage (R)	October 8–9, 2024	800 (LV)	± 3.7%	46%	48%	6%
Fabrizio, Lee & Associates (R)/McLaughlin & Associates (R) (Note: Poll sponsored by Trump's campaign)	October 6–9, 2024	800 (LV)	± 3.5%	48%	49%	3%
Fabrizio Ward (R)/Impact Research (D) (Note: Poll commissioned by AARP)	October 2–8, 2024	600 (LV)	± 4.0%	48%	49%	3% (Note: "Other" with 1%)
ActiVote	September 15 – October 9, 2024	400 (LV)	± 4.9%	51%	49%	–
Emerson College	October 5–8, 2024	950 (LV)	± 3.1%	49%	49%	2%
Emerson College	October 5–8, 2024	950 (LV)	± 3.1%	50%	50%	–
The Wall Street Journal	September 28 – October 8, 2024	600 (RV)	± 5.0%	49%	47%	4%
Research Co.	October 5–7, 2024	450 (LV)	± 4.6%	46%	44%	10% (Note: "Some other candidate" with 1%)
Research Co.	October 5–7, 2024	450 (LV)	± 4.6%	51%	48%	1%
Quinnipiac University	October 3–7, 2024	1,007 (LV)	± 3.1%	47%	51%	2%
OnMessage Inc. (R) (Note: Poll conducted for the Article III Project)	September 24 – October 2, 2024	500 (LV)	± 4.4%	48%	46%	6%
Mitchell Research	September 30, 2024	709 (LV)	± 3.7%	48%	49%	3%
Trafalgar Group (R)	September 28–30, 2024	1,086 (LV)	± 2.9%	44%	47%	9%
Global Strategy Group (D)/North Star Opinion Research (R) (Note: Poll sponsored by the Peter G. Peterson Foundation)	September 23–29, 2024	404 (LV)	± 4.9%	47%	49%	4%
RMG Research	September 24–27, 2024	789 (LV)	± 3.5%	50%	46%	4% (Note: "Someone else" with 2%)
RMG Research	September 24–27, 2024	789 (LV)	± 3.5%	50%	47%	3%
The New York Times/Siena College	September 21–26, 2024	688 (RV)	± 4.0%	45%	47%	8%
The New York Times/Siena College	September 21–26, 2024	688 (LV)	± 4.0%	48%	47%	5%
AtlasIntel	September 20–25, 2024	918 (LV)	± 3.0%	47%	51%	2%
Cook Political Report/BSG (R)/GS Strategy Group (D)	September 19–25, 2024	416 (LV)	–	51%	48%	1%
Bloomberg/Morning Consult	September 19–25, 2024	894 (RV)	± 3.0%	49%	47%	4%
Bloomberg/Morning Consult	September 19–25, 2024	800 (LV)	± 3.0%	50%	47%	3%
Rodriguez Gudelunas Strategies (Note: Poll sponsored by Focus on Rural America)	September 19–23, 2024	400 (LV)	–	51%	45%	4%
Rasmussen Reports (R)	September 19−22, 2024	1,086 (LV)	± 3.0%	48%	48%	4%
Emerson College	September 15–18, 2024	875 (LV)	± 3.2%	49%	47%	4%
Emerson College	September 15–18, 2024	875 (LV)	± 3.2%	50%	49%	1%
Morning Consult	September 9−18, 2024	1,297 (LV)	± 3.0%	52%	44%	4%
Marist College	September 12−17, 2024	1,282 (RV)	± 3.2%	50%	47%	3%
Marist College	September 12−17, 2024	1,138 (LV)	± 3.4%	52%	47%	1%
Quinnipiac University	September 12–16, 2024	905 (LV)	± 3.3%	51%	46%	3%
InsiderAdvantage (R)	September 11–12, 2024	800 (LV)	± 3.7%	48%	49%	3%
Mitchell Research	September 11, 2024	580 (LV)	± 4.0%	48%	48%	4%
Morning Consult	August 30 – September 8, 2024	1,368 (LV)	± 3.0%	49%	46%	5%
co/efficient (R)	September 4–6, 2024	931 (LV)	± 3.2%	47%	47%	6%
CBS News/YouGov	September 3–6, 2024	1,077 (LV)	± 3.7%	50%	49%	1%
Patriot Polling	September 1–3, 2024	822 (RV)	–	48%	48%	4%
Cygnal (R)	August 28 – September 1, 2024	600 (LV)	± 4.0%	47%	46%	7%
Trafalgar Group (R)	August 28–30, 2024	1,089 (LV)	± 2.9%	47%	47%	6%
Emerson College	August 25–28, 2024	800 (LV)	± 3.4%	50%	47%	3%
Emerson College	August 25–28, 2024	800 (LV)	± 3.4%	51%	48%	1%
ActiVote	July 28 – August 28, 2024	400 (LV)	± 4.9%	50%	50%	–
EPIC-MRA	August 23–26, 2024	600 (LV)	± 4.0%	46%	47%	7%
Bloomberg/Morning Consult	August 23–26, 2024	651 (LV)	± 4.0%	49%	47%	4%
Bloomberg/Morning Consult	August 23–26, 2024	702 (RV)	± 4.0%	49%	46%	5%
	August 23, 2024	Robert F. Kennedy Jr. suspends his presidential campaign and endorses Donald Trump.				
YouGov (Note: Poll conducted for the Cato Institute)	August 15–23, 2024	500 (A)	± 5.0%	44%	44%	12% (Note: "Will not vote" with 4%)
YouGov	August 15–23, 2024	– (LV)	± 6.0%	47%	48%	5%
TIPP Insights (Note: Poll sponsored by American Greatness)	August 20–22, 2024	741 (LV)	± 3.7%	48%	46%	6%
	August 19–22, 2024	Democratic National Convention				
Fabrizio Ward (R) (Note: Poll conducted for the Pinpoint Policy Institute)	August 19–21, 2024	400 (LV)	± 4.9%	46%	48%	6%
Rasmussen Reports (R) (Note: Poll sponsored by NumbersUSA)	August 13–19, 2024	1,093 (LV)	± 3.0%	48%	47%	5%
Focaldata	August 6–16, 2024	702 (LV)	± 3.7%	53%	47%	–
The Bullfinch Group (Note: Poll conducted for The Independent Center)	August 8–11, 2024	500 (RV)	± 4.4%	48%	43%	9%
Fabrizio Ward (R)/Impact Research (D)	August 7–11, 2024	600 (LV)	± 4.0%	48%	48%	4%
InsiderAdvantage (R)	August 6–8, 2024	800 (LV)	–	49%	47%	4%
The New York Times/Siena College	August 5–8, 2024	619 (RV)	± 4.8%	45%	48%	7%
The New York Times/Siena College	August 5–8, 2024	619 (LV)	± 4.8%	50%	46%	5%
Navigator Research (D)	July 31 – August 8, 2024	600 (LV)	± 4.0%	47%	46%	7%
Cook Political Report/BSG (R)/GS Strategy Group (D)	July 26 – August 8, 2024	406 (LV)	–	49%	46%	6%
Public Opinion Strategies (R) (Note: Poll conducted for Competitiveness Coalition)	July 23–29, 2024	400 (LV)	± 4.9%	45%	45%	10%
Bloomberg/Morning Consult	July 24–28, 2024	706 (RV)	± 4.0%	53%	42%	4%
SoCal Strategies (R) (Note: Poll sponsored by Red Eagle Politics)	July 25–26, 2024	500 (RV)	± 4.4%	46%	49%	5%
Fox News	July 22–24, 2024	1,012 (RV)	± 3.0%	49%	49%	2%
Emerson College	July 22–23, 2024	800 (RV)	± 3.4%	45%	46%	9%
Emerson College	July 22–23, 2024	800 (RV)	± 3.4%	49%	51%	–
	July 21, 2024	Joe Biden announces his withdrawal; Kamala Harris declares her candidacy.				
	July 19, 2024	Republican National Convention concludes				
	July 13, 2024	Attempted assassination of Donald Trump				
Public Policy Polling (D) (Note: Poll conducted for Progress Action Fund, which supports Democratic candidates)	July 11–12, 2024	568 (RV)	–	46%	48%	6%
Bloomberg/Morning Consult	May 7–13, 2024	704 (RV)	± 4.0%	44%	47%	9%
The New York Times/Siena College	October 22 – November 3, 2023	616 (RV)	± 4.4%	45%	47%	8%
The New York Times/Siena College	October 22 – November 3, 2023	616 (LV)	± 4.4%	48%	46%	6%

Kamala Harris vs. Donald Trump vs. Cornel West vs. Jill Stein vs. Chase Oliver

Poll source	Date(s) administered	Sample size	Margin of error	Kamala Harris Democratic	Donald Trump Republican	Cornel West Independent	Jill Stein Green	Chase Oliver Libertarian	Other / Undecided
HarrisX	November 3–5, 2024	1,864 (RV)	± 2.3%	46%	45%	1%	0%	–	8%
HarrisX	November 3–5, 2024	1,864 (RV)	± 2.3%	48.6%	48.3%	2.1%	1.0%	–	–
HarrisX	November 3–5, 2024	1,668 (LV)	± 2.3%	48%	48%	1%	1%	–	2%
HarrisX	November 3–5, 2024	1,668 (LV)	± 2.3%	49.5%	48.8%	1.1%	0.7%	–	–
AtlasIntel	November 3–4, 2024	1,113 (LV)	± 3.0%	48%	50%	–	2%	0%	–
AtlasIntel	November 1–2, 2024	1,198 (LV)	± 3.0%	48%	49%	–	2%	0%	1%
The New York Times/Siena College	October 29 – November 2, 2024	998 (RV)	± 3.5%	42%	44%	1%	2%	2%	9%
The New York Times/Siena College	October 29 – November 2, 2024	998 (LV)	± 3.5%	45%	45%	0%	2%	1%	7%
Focaldata	October 3 – November 1, 2024	2,092 (LV)	–	50%	45%	–	1%	1%	3%
Focaldata	October 3 – November 1, 2024	1,941 (RV)	± 2.1%	51%	44%	–	1%	1%	3%
Focaldata	October 3 – November 1, 2024	2,092 (A)	–	50%	44%	–	1%	1%	4%
AtlasIntel	October 30–31, 2024	1,136 (LV)	± 3.0%	48%	49%	–	2%	0%	1%
Redfield & Wilton Strategies	October 28–31, 2024	1,731 (LV)	–	47%	47%	–	1%	1%	4%
YouGov	October 25–31, 2024	985 (RV)	± 3.9%	47%	45%	0%	2%	–	6%
YouGov	October 25–31, 2024	942 (LV)	± 3.9%	48%	45%	0%	2%	–	5%
AtlasIntel	October 25–29, 2024	938 (LV)	± 3.0%	48%	49%	–	2%	0%	1%
Redfield & Wilton Strategies	October 25–27, 2024	728 (LV)	–	49%	48%	–	1%	0%	2%
Redfield & Wilton Strategies	October 20–22, 2024	1,115 (LV)	–	47%	47%	–	1%	0%	5%
Quinnipiac University	October 17–21, 2024	1,136 (LV)	± 2.9%	49%	46%	1%	1%	0%	3% (Note: Randall Terry (C) with 0%)
Bloomberg/Morning Consult	October 16–20, 2024	756 (RV)	± 4.0%	47%	45%	–	1%	2%	5%
Bloomberg/Morning Consult	October 16–20, 2024	705 (LV)	± 4.0%	49%	46%	–	1%	2%	2%
Redfield & Wilton Strategies	October 16–18, 2024	1,008 (LV)	–	47%	47%	–	0%	1%	5%
Redfield & Wilton Strategies	October 12–14, 2024	682 (LV)	–	47%	47%	–	0%	1%	5%
Quinnipiac University	October 3–7, 2024	1,007 (LV)	± 3.1%	47%	50%	1%	0%	1%	1%
Redfield & Wilton Strategies	September 27 – October 2, 2024	839 (LV)	–	48%	46%	–	0%	1%	5%
The New York Times/Siena College	September 21–26, 2024	688 (RV)	± 4.0%	43%	46%	–	2%	2%	7%
The New York Times/Siena College	September 21–26, 2024	688 (LV)	± 4.0%	46%	46%	–	2%	1%	5%
Bloomberg/Morning Consult	September 19–25, 2024	894 (RV)	± 3.0%	49%	45%	–	1%	2%	3%
Bloomberg/Morning Consult	September 19–25, 2024	800 (LV)	± 3.0%	50%	46%	–	1%	1%	2%
Remington Research Group (R) (Note: Poll sponsored by American Fuel & Petrochemical Manufacturers, a group that supports Republican candidates)	September 16–20, 2024	800 (LV)	± 3.5%	49%	47%	0%	1%	–	3%
Redfield & Wilton Strategies	September 16–19, 2024	993 (LV)	–	46%	45%	–	0%	1%	8%
Quinnipiac University	September 12–16, 2024	905 (LV)	± 3.3%	50%	45%	0%	2%	0%	3%
Redfield & Wilton Strategies	September 6–9, 2024	556 (LV)	–	48%	45%	–	1%	1%	5%
YouGov	August 23 – September 3, 2024	1,000 (RV)	± 3.6%	48%	43%	1%	1%	–	7%
Redfield & Wilton Strategies	August 25–28, 2024	1,071 (LV)	–	47%	44%	–	1%	1%	7%
Bloomberg/Morning Consult	August 23–26, 2024	651 (LV)	± 4.0%	49%	47%	–	0%	2%	2%
Bloomberg/Morning Consult	August 23–26, 2024	702 (RV)	± 4.0%	48%	46%	–	1%	2%	3%

Kamala Harris vs. Donald Trump vs. Robert F. Kennedy Jr. vs. Cornel West vs. Jill Stein vs. Chase Oliver

Aggregate polls

Source of poll aggregation	Dates administered	Dates updated	Kamala Harris Democratic	Donald Trump Republican	Robert F. Kennedy Jr. (Note: Kennedy suspended his campaign, but he remains on the ballot in Michigan.) Natural Law	Jill Stein Green	Cornel West Independent	Chase Oliver Libertarian	Others/ Undecided (Note: Calculated by taking the difference of 100% and all other candidates combined.)	Margin
Race to the WH	through October 7, 2024	October 13, 2024	47.0%	46.9%	1.9%	0.9%	0.6%	—N/a	2.7%	Harris +0.1%
270toWin	October 7 – 11, 2024	October 11, 2024	47.0%	46.6%	2.3%	0.3%	1.0%	0.8%	2.0%	Harris +0.4%
Average			47.0%	46.8%	2.1%	0.6%	0.8%	0.8%	1.9%	Harris +0.2%

Poll source	Date(s) administered	Sample size	Margin of error	Kamala Harris Democratic	Donald Trump Republican	Robert Kennedy Jr Natural Law	Cornel West Independent	Jill Stein Green	Chase Oliver Libertarian	Other / Undecided
Mitchell Research	October 29 – November 2, 2024	585 (LV)	± 4.0%	49%	48%	0%	1%	1%	1%	–
Echelon Insights	October 27–30, 2024	600 (LV)	± 4.4%	47%	47%	1%	0%	0%	0%	5%
EPIC-MRA (Note: Poll sponsored by The Detroit Free Press)	October 24–28, 2024	600 (LV)	± 4.0%	48%	45%	3%	1%	3%	–	–
Fox News	October 24–28, 2024	1,275 (RV)	± 2.5%	49%	45%	3%	1%	0%	1%	1%
Fox News	October 24–28, 2024	988 (LV)	± 3.0%	48%	46%	3%	1%	0%	1%	1%
CNN/SSRS	October 23–28, 2024	726 (LV)	± 4.7%	48%	43%	3%	1%	2%	0%	3%
Suffolk University/USA Today	October 24–27, 2024	500 (LV)	± 4.4%	47%	47%	1%	1%	1%	0%	3% (Note: Joseph Kishore (SEP) & Randall Terry (C) with 0% each)
Glengariff Group (Note: Poll commissioned by The Detroit News & WDIV-TV)	October 22–24, 2024	600 (LV)	± 4.0%	47%	44%	4%	–	2%	1%	2%
University of Massachusetts Lowell/YouGov	October 16–24, 2024	600 (LV)	± 4.5%	49%	45%	1%	0%	0%	1%	4%
AtlasIntel	October 12–17, 2024	1,529 (LV)	± 3.0%	47%	50%	1%	0%	1%	0%	1%
Mitchell Research	October 14, 2024	589 (LV)	± 4.0%	47%	47%	0%	0%	1%	1%	4%
Marketing Resource Group	October 7–11, 2024	600 (LV)	± 4.0%	45%	44%	3%	–	2%	–	6% (Note: "Other" with 2%; "Refused" with 1%)
Fabrizio Ward (R)/Impact Research (D)	October 2–8, 2024	600 (LV)	± 4.0%	46%	46%	3%	0%	1%	0%	4%
The Wall Street Journal	September 28 – October 8, 2024	600 (RV)	± 5.0%	47%	45%	2%	1%	1%	1%	3%
Glengariff Group	October 1–4, 2024	600 (LV)	± 4.0%	47%	44%	5%	1%	1%	1%	1%
Mitchell Research	September 30, 2024	709 (LV)	± 3.7%	47%	47%	2%	0%	1%	1%	2%
Global Strategy Group (D)/North Star Opinion Research (R)	September 23–29, 2024	404 (LV)	± 4.9%	46%	48%	2%	1%	0%	0%	3%
AtlasIntel	September 20–25, 2024	918 (LV)	± 3.0%	47%	50%	0%	–	2%	0%	1%
Cook Political Report/BSG (R)/GS Strategy Group (D)	September 19–25, 2024	416 (LV)	–	49%	46%	0%	1%	2%	–	2%
University of Massachusetts Lowell/YouGov	September 11–19, 2024	650 (LV)	± 4.4%	48%	43%	2%	–	2%	2%	3% (Note: Randall Terry (C), Joseph Kishore (SEP), & Shiva Ayyadurai (I) with 0% each)
Suffolk University/USA Today	September 16–18, 2024	500 (LV)	± 4.4%	48%	45%	1%	0%	0%	0%	6%
Mitchell Research	September 11, 2024	580 (LV)	± 4.0%	47%	46%	2%	0%	1%	–	4%
CNN/SSRS	August 23–29, 2024	708 (LV)	± 4.9%	48%	43%	4%	–	1%	1%	3%
Z to A Research (D) (Note: Poll conducted for Rust Belt Rising, which supports Democratic candidates)	August 23–26, 2024	518 (LV)	–	47%	47%	3%	–	1%	1%	1%
YouGov	August 15–23, 2024	500 (A)	± 5.0%	44%	42%	5%	1%	0%	1%	7% (Note: "Will not vote" with 4%)
YouGov	August 15–23, 2024	– (LV)	± 6.0%	47%	46%	4%	0%	0%	0%	3%
TIPP Insights	August 20–22, 2024	741 (LV)	± 3.7%	46%	45%	5%	1%	1%	–	2%
Rasmussen Reports (R)	August 13–17, 2024	1,093 (LV)	–	47%	44%	4%	1%	1%	–	3%
Focaldata	August 6–16, 2024	702 (LV)	± 3.7%	51%	44%	4%	–	1%	0%	–
Focaldata	August 6–16, 2024	702 (RV)	± 3.7%	50%	44%	4%	–	1%	0%	1%
Focaldata	August 6–16, 2024	702 (A)	± 3.7%	50%	42%	5%	–	1%	0%	2%
Redfield & Wilton Strategies	August 12–15, 2024	530 (LV)	–	44%	45%	5%	–	1%	0%	5%
The Bullfinch Group	August 8–11, 2024	500 (RV)	± 4.4%	46%	40%	7%	1%	1%	–	5%
Fabrizio Ward (R)/Impact Research (D)	August 7–11, 2024	600 (LV)	± 4.0%	43%	45%	6%	1%	1%	0%	4%
The New York Times/Siena College	August 5–8, 2024	619 (RV)	± 4.8%	44%	43%	5%	0%	1%	0%	6%
The New York Times/Siena College	August 5–8, 2024	619 (LV)	± 4.8%	48%	43%	4%	0%	1%	0%	3%
Navigator Research (D)	July 31 – August 8, 2024	600 (LV)	± 4.0%	44%	44%	5%	1%	0%	0%	6%
Cook Political Report/BSG (R)/GS Strategy Group (D)	July 26 – August 8, 2024	406 (LV)	–	46%	44%	6%	1%	0%	–	3%
Redfield & Wilton Strategies	July 31 – August 3, 2024	771 (LV)	–	41%	42%	5%	–	1%	0%	11%
Bloomberg/Morning Consult	July 24–28, 2024	706 (RV)	± 4.0%	51%	39%	5%	–	1%	2%	2%
Fox News	July 22–24, 2024	1,012 (RV)	± 3.0%	43%	45%	7%	1%	1%	0%	3%
Redfield & Wilton Strategies	July 22–24, 2024	512 (LV)	–	41%	44%	7%	–	0%	0%	8%
Glengariff Group	July 22–24, 2024	600 (LV)	± 4.0%	42%	41%	10%	–	1%	1%	5%
Emerson College	July 22–23, 2024	800 (RV)	± 3.4%	44%	44%	5%	1%	1%	0%	5%

Kamala Harris vs. Donald Trump vs. Robert F. Kennedy Jr. vs. Jill Stein

Poll source	Date(s) administered	Sample size	Margin of error	Kamala Harris Democratic	Donald Trump Republican	Robert F. Kennedy Jr. Independent	Jill Stein Green	Other / Undecided
Glengariff Group	August 26–28, 2024	600 (LV)	± 4.0%	44%	45%	5%	1%	5%
EPIC-MRA	August 23–26, 2024	600 (LV)	± 4.0%	45%	46%	3%	1%	5%
Public Policy Polling (D) (Note: Poll conducted for Clean and Prosperous America PAC)	July 17–18, 2024	650 (RV)	± 3.9%	41%	46%	5%	1%	7%

Kamala Harris vs. Donald Trump vs. Robert F. Kennedy Jr.

Poll source	Date(s) administered	Sample size	Margin of error	Kamala Harris Democratic	Donald Trump Republican	Robert F. Kennedy Jr. Independent	Other / Undecided
Fabrizio Ward (R)	August 19–21, 2024	400 (LV)	± 4.9%	44%	43%	5%	8%
Civiqs	July 13–16, 2024	532 (RV)	± 5.3%	46%	46%	5%	3%

Hypothetical polling with Joe Biden and Donald Trump

Joe Biden vs. Donald Trump

Poll source	Date(s) administered	Sample size	Margin of error	Joe Biden Democratic	Donald Trump Republican	Other / Undecided
Public Policy Polling (D)	July 17–18, 2024	650 (RV)	± 3.9%	46%	49%	5%
EPIC-MRA (Note: Poll sponsored by The Detroit Free Press)	July 13–17, 2024	600 (RV)	± 4.0%	42%	49%	9%
Emerson College (Note: Poll sponsored by Democrats for the Next Generation PAC)	July 15–16, 2024	1,000 (RV)	± 3.0%	42%	45%	13%
Marketing Resource Group	July 11–13, 2024	600 (LV)	± 4.0%	36%	39%	25% (Note: "Someone else" with 14%)
Public Policy Polling (D)	July 11–12, 2024	568 (RV)	–	46%	47%	7%
Rasmussen Reports (R) (Note: Poll sponsored by The Heartland Institute)	July 5–12, 2024	1,025 (LV)	± 3.0%	46%	46%	8%
Echelon Insights (Note: Poll sponsored by NetChoice)	July 1–8, 2024	607 (LV)	± 5.2%	45%	48%	7%
Bloomberg/Morning Consult	July 1–5, 2024	694 (RV)	± 4.0%	48%	43%	9%
Emerson College	June 30 – July 2, 2024	1,000 (RV)	± 3.0%	44%	45%	12%
EPIC-MRA	June 21–26, 2024	600 (LV)	± 4.0%	45%	49%	6%
Emerson College	June 13–18, 2024	1,000 (RV)	± 3.0%	45%	46%	9%
Emerson College	June 13–18, 2024	1,000 (RV)	± 3.0%	49%	51%	–
Mitchell Research	June 3, 2024	697 (LV)	± 3.7%	48%	48%	4%
Mainstreet Research/Florida Atlantic University	May 30–31, 2024	723 (RV)	± 3.6%	45%	45%	10%
Mainstreet Research/Florida Atlantic University	May 30–31, 2024	636 (LV)	± 3.6%	47%	46%	7%
Mitchell Research	May 20–21, 2024	697 (LV)	± 3.7%	47%	49%	4%
KAConsulting (R) (Note: Poll conducted for Vapor Technology Association)	May 15–19, 2024	600 (RV)	–	44%	45%	11%
Prime Group (Note: Poll sponsored by Citizens to Save Our Republic PAC, which opposes Trump and third party candidates)	May 9–16, 2024	482 (RV)	–	52%	48%	–
Bloomberg/Morning Consult	May 7–13, 2024	704 (RV)	± 4.0%	46%	45%	9%
Cook Political Report/BSG (R)/GS Strategy Group (D)	May 6–13, 2024	606 (LV)	± 4.0%	45%	47%	8%
The New York Times/Siena College	April 28 – May 9, 2024	616 (RV)	± 4.0%	42%	49%	9%
The New York Times/Siena College	April 28 – May 9, 2024	616 (LV)	± 4.0%	47%	46%	7%
Emerson College	April 25–29, 2024	1,000 (RV)	± 3.0%	44%	45%	11%
Emerson College	April 25–29, 2024	1,000 (RV)	± 3.0%	48%	52%	–
CBS News/YouGov	April 19–25, 2024	1,262 (LV)	± 3.1%	51%	49%	–
Kaplan Strategies	April 20–21, 2024	804 (RV)	± 3.5%	36%	51%	13%
John Zogby Strategies (Note: Poll conducted for Kennedy's campaign)	April 13–21, 2024	640 (LV)	–	48%	45%	7%
Fox News	April 11–16, 2024	1,126 (RV)	± 3.0%	46%	49%	5%
Bloomberg/Morning Consult	April 8–15, 2024	708 (RV)	± 4.0%	47%	45%	8%
Marketing Resource Group	April 8–11, 2024	600 (LV)	± 4.0%	36%	42%	22%
The Bullfinch Group	March 29 – April 3, 2024	600 (RV)	± 4.0%	42%	39%	19%
Big Data Poll (R)	March 26–30, 2024	1,218 (RV)	± 2.6%	42%	44%	14% (Note: "Someone else" with 8%)
Big Data Poll (R)	March 26–30, 2024	1,218 (RV)	± 2.6%	44%	45%	11% (Note: "Someone else" with 11%)
Big Data Poll (R)	March 26–30, 2024	1,218 (RV)	± 2.6%	41%	46%	13%
Big Data Poll (R)	March 26–30, 2024	1,145 (LV)	± 2.6%	43%	44%	13%
Big Data Poll (R)	March 26–30, 2024	1,145 (LV)	± 2.6%	45%	46%	9% (Note: "Someone else" with 9%)
Big Data Poll (R)	March 26–30, 2024	1,145 (LV)	± 2.6%	43%	46%	11%
Big Data Poll (R)	March 26–30, 2024	1,145 (LV)	± 2.6%	48.5%	51.5%	–
Spry Strategies (R)	March 25–28, 2024	709 (LV)	± 3.7%	44%	48%	8%
The Wall Street Journal	March 17–24, 2024	600 (RV)	± 4.0%	45%	48%	7%
Echelon Insights (Note: Poll sponsored by The Heritage Foundation)	March 12–19, 2024	400 (LV)	± 5.3%	45%	51%	4%
Emerson College	March 14–18, 2024	1,000 (RV)	± 3.0%	44%	45%	11%
Emerson College	March 14–18, 2024	1,000 (RV)	± 3.0%	50%	50%	–
CNN/SSRS	March 13–18, 2024	1,097 (RV)	± 3.6%	42%	50%	8%
Mitchell Research	March 15–16, 2024	627 (LV)	± 3.9%	44%	47%	9%
Quinnipiac University	March 8–12, 2024	1,487 (RV)	± 2.5%	45%	48%	7%
Bloomberg/Morning Consult	March 8–12, 2024	698 (RV)	± 4.0%	45%	45%	10%
North Star Opinion Research (R) (Note: Poll sponsored by League of American Workers)	February 22–25, 2024	600 (LV)	± 4.0%	43%	43%	13%
Kaplan Strategies	February 22−23, 2024	1,019 (RV)	± 3.1%	36%	46%	18%
Bloomberg/Morning Consult	February 12–20, 2024	702 (RV)	± 4.0%	44%	46%	10%
Emerson College	February 20–24, 2024	1,000 (LV)	± 3.0%	44%	46%	10%
EPIC-MRA	February 13–18, 2024	600 (LV)	± 4.0%	41%	45%	14%
Fox News	February 8–12, 2024	1,106 (RV)	± 3.0%	45%	47%	8%
Focaldata	January 17–23, 2024	863 (A)	–	41%	43%	16% (Note: "Another candidate" with 9%)
Focaldata	January 17–23, 2024	– (LV)	–	45%	44%	11% (Note: "Another candidate" with 7%)
Focaldata	January 17–23, 2024	– (LV)	–	51%	49%	–
Bloomberg/Morning Consult	January 16–21, 2024	703 (RV)	± 4.0%	42%	47%	7%
Target Insyght	January 4–10, 2024	800 (RV)	–	45%	41%	14%
Glengariff Group	January 2–6, 2024	600 (LV)	± 4.0%	39%	47%	14%
John Zogby Strategies	January 2–4, 2024	602 (LV)	–	44%	47%	9%
CNN/SSRS	November 29 – December 6, 2023	1,197 (RV)	± 3.4%	40%	50%	10%
Bloomberg/Morning Consult	November 27 – December 6, 2023	703 (RV)	± 4.0%	42%	46%	12%
Big Data Poll (R)	November 16–19, 2023	1,273 (RV)	± 2.7%	36%	41%	23% (Note: "Another third party candidate" with 12%; "Would not vote" with 4%)
Big Data Poll (R)	November 16–19, 2023	1,200 (LV)	± 2.7%	37%	42%	21% (Note: "Another third party candidate" with 12%; "Would not vote" with 2%)
EPIC-MRA	November 10–16, 2023	600 (LV)	± 4.0%	41%	46%	13%
Bloomberg/Morning Consult	October 30 – November 7, 2023	700 (RV)	± 4.0%	43%	43%	14%
Emerson College	October 30 – November 4, 2023	1,000 (RV)	± 3.0%	43%	41%	16%
The New York Times/Siena College	October 22 – November 3, 2023	616 (RV)	± 4.4%	43%	48%	9%
The New York Times/Siena College	October 22 – November 3, 2023	616 (LV)	± 4.4%	46%	46%	8%
Bloomberg/Morning Consult	October 5–10, 2023	706 (RV)	± 4.0%	44%	44%	12%
Redfield & Wilton Strategies	October 7–9, 2023	820 (LV)	–	41%	41%	17%
Marketing Resource Group	October 2–8, 2023	600 (LV)	± 4.0%	35%	42%	22%
Emerson College	October 1–4, 2023	468 (RV)	± 4.5%	44%	43%	8%
Public Policy Polling (D) (Note: Poll commissioned by Save My Country Action Fund)	September 26–27, 2023	679 (RV)	± 3.8%	48%	44%	8%
Susquehanna Polling & Research	September 7–12, 2023	700 (RV)	± 3.7%	46%	43%	11%
EPIC-MRA	August 6–11, 2023	600 (LV)	± 4.0%	46%	45%	9%
Emerson College	August 1–2, 2023	1,121 (LV)	± 2.9%	44%	44%	13%
Mitchell Research	July 11–13, 2023	639 (LV)	± 4.0%	45%	43%	13%
Public Opinion Strategies (R) (Note: Poll commissioned by Citizens Awareness Project)	Jul 8–10, 2023	500 (RV)	± 4.38%	45%	44%	9%
Prime Group	June 14–28, 2023	500 (RV)	–	50%	50%	–
Prime Group	June 14–28, 2023	500 (RV)	–	40%	43%	17% (Note: No Labels candidate)
EPIC-MRA	June 8–14, 2023	600 (LV)	± 4.0%	44%	44%	12%
Public Opinion Strategies (R)	April 17–19, 2023	500 (V)	± 3.6%	45%	42%	12%
Public Policy Polling (D) (Note: Poll sponsored by Progress Michigan, a sponsor for the Democratic Party)	December 6–7, 2022	763 (V)	± 3.6%	50%	43%	7%
EPIC-MRA	November 30 – December 6, 2022	600 (LV)	± 4.0%	47%	43%	10%
Emerson College	October 28–31, 2022	900 (LV)	± 3.2%	44%	47%	9%
Emerson College	October 12–14, 2022	580 (LV)	± 4.0%	44%	44%	12%
EPIC-MRA	September 15–19, 2022	600 (LV)	–	48%	44%	8%
Blueprint Polling (D)	August 15–16, 2022	611 (LV)	± 4.0%	41%	41%	19%
Blueprint Polling (D)	February 1–4, 2022	632 (LV)	± 3.9%	38%	40%	22%
Fabrizio, Lee & Associates (R)	November 11–16, 2021	600 (LV)	± 4.0%	41%	53%	6%

Joe Biden vs. Donald Trump vs. Robert F. Kennedy Jr. vs. Cornel West vs. Jill Stein

Poll source	Date(s) administered	Sample size	Margin of error	Joe Biden Democratic	Donald Trump Republican	Robert F. Kennedy Jr. Independent	Cornel West Independent	Jill Stein Green	Other / Undecided
Trafalgar Group (R)	July 15–17, 2024	1,091 (LV)	± 2.9%	43%	45%	4%	1%	1%	6%
EPIC-MRA	July 13–17, 2024	600 (RV)	± 4.0%	36%	43%	8%	2%	2%	9%
Emerson College	July 15–16, 2024	1,000 (RV)	± 3.0%	40%	43%	7%	1%	1%	8%
Rasmussen Reports (R)	July 5–12, 2024	1,025 (LV)	± 3.0%	43%	44%	7%	0%	1%	5% (Note: Chase Oliver (L) with 1%)
YouGov	July 4–12, 2024	1,000 (RV)	± 3.6%	40%	42%	4%	1%	1%	12%
Echelon Insights	July 1–8, 2024	607 (LV)	± 5.2%	40%	43%	8%	2%	2%	5% (Note: Chase Oliver (L) with 0%)
Bloomberg/Morning Consult	July 1–5, 2024	694 (RV)	± 4.0%	45%	39%	6%	2%	1%	7%
EPIC-MRA	June 21–26, 2024	600 (LV)	± 4.0%	38%	42%	10%	2%	2%	6%
Emerson College	June 13–18, 2024	1,000 (RV)	± 3.0%	42%	44%	5%	1%	1%	7%
Mitchell Research	June 3, 2024	697 (LV)	± 3.7%	45%	46%	3%	1%	1%	4%
Mitchell Research	May 20–21, 2024	697 (LV)	± 3.7%	45%	46%	5%	1%	1%	2%
KAConsulting (R)	May 15–19, 2024	600 (RV)	–	41%	42%	7%	2%	1%	7% (Note: Lars Mapstead (L) with 1%)
Prime Group	May 9–16, 2024	482 (RV)	–	44%	42%	10%	2%	2%	–
Bloomberg/Morning Consult	May 7–13, 2024	704 (RV)	± 4.0%	42%	40%	7%	1%	2%	8%
Cook Political Report/BSG (R)/GS Strategy Group (D)	May 6–13, 2024	606 (LV)	± 4.0%	40%	43%	7%	2%	2%	6%
The New York Times/Siena College	April 28 – May 9, 2024	616 (RV)	± 4.0%	36%	38%	9%	0%	1%	16%
The New York Times/Siena College	April 28 – May 9, 2024	616 (LV)	± 4.0%	42%	39%	7%	0%	1%	11%
Emerson College	April 25–29, 2024	1,000 (RV)	± 3.0%	42%	43%	5%	1%	1%	8%
Fox News	April 11–16, 2024	1,126 (RV)	± 3.0%	40%	42%	9%	2%	2%	5%
Bloomberg/Morning Consult	April 8–15, 2024	708 (RV)	± 4.0%	43%	40%	7%	1%	1%	8%
Marketing Resource Group	April 8–11, 2024	600 (LV)	± 4.0%	34%	37%	13%	2%	1%	13%
The Wall Street Journal	March 17–24, 2024	600 (RV)	± 4.0%	37%	39%	12%	2%	2%	8%
Emerson College	March 14–18, 2024	1,000 (RV)	± 3.0%	41%	43%	5%	1%	1%	10%
Mitchell Research	March 15–16, 2024	627 (LV)	± 3.9%	42%	44%	6%	1%	1%	6%
Quinnipiac University	March 8–12, 2024	1,487 (RV)	± 2.5%	36%	41%	10%	3%	4%	6%
Bloomberg/Morning Consult	March 8–12, 2024	698 (RV)	± 4.0%	40%	40%	9%	3%	2%	6%
Bloomberg/Morning Consult	February 12–20, 2024	702 (RV)	± 4.0%	40%	41%	9%	1%	1%	8%
Emerson College	February 20–24, 2024	1,000 (LV)	± 3.0%	39%	42%	6%	1%	1%	11%
Fox News	February 8–12, 2024	1,106 (RV)	± 3.0%	37%	42%	11%	2%	3%	5%
Bloomberg/Morning Consult	January 16–21, 2024	703 (RV)	± 4.0%	37%	43%	8%	1%	1%	10%
Bloomberg/Morning Consult	November 27 – December 6, 2023	703 (RV)	± 4.0%	35%	39%	10%	2%	1%	13%
Big Data Poll (R)	November 16–19, 2023	1,273 (RV)	± 2.7%	36%	39%	9%	1%	1%	14% (Note: "Would not vote" with 3%)
Big Data Poll (R)	November 16–19, 2023	1,200 (LV)	± 2.7%	37%	41%	9%	1%	1%	11% (Note: "Would not vote" with 1%)

Joe Biden vs. Donald Trump vs. Robert F. Kennedy Jr.

Poll source	Date(s) administered	Sample size	Margin of error	Joe Biden Democratic	Donald Trump Republican	Robert F. Kennedy Jr. Independent	Other / Undecided
Civiqs	July 13–16, 2024	532 (RV)	± 5.3%	43%	46%	5%	6%
1983 Labs	June 28–30, 2024	563 (LV)	± 4.1%	41%	45%	5%	9%
P2 Insights (Note: Poll sponsored by Building America's Future, which supports Republican candidates)	June 11–20, 2024	650 (LV)	± 3.8%	40%	43%	8%	9%
Mainstreet Research/Florida Atlantic University	May 30–31, 2024	723 (RV)	± 3.6%	41%	39%	11%	9%
Mainstreet Research/Florida Atlantic University	May 30–31, 2024	636 (LV)	± 3.6%	44%	43%	8%	5%
P2 Insights	May 13−21, 2024	650 (LV)	± 3.8%	37%	45%	7%	11%
Big Data Poll (R)	March 26–30, 2024	1,218 (RV)	± 2.6%	40%	44%	7%	9% (Note: "Someone else" with 4%)
Big Data Poll (R)	March 26–30, 2024	1,218 (RV)	± 2.6%	41%	45%	8%	6% (Note: "Someone else" with 6%)
Big Data Poll (R)	March 26–30, 2024	1,145 (LV)	± 2.6%	41%	44%	7%	13% (Note: "Someone else" with 3%)
Big Data Poll (R)	March 26–30, 2024	1,145 (LV)	± 2.6%	42%	45%	8%	5% (Note: "Someone else" with 5%)
Spry Strategies (R)	March 25–28, 2024	709 (LV)	± 3.7%	40%	43%	9%	8%
Redfield & Wilton Strategies	March 14–17, 2024	616 (LV)	–	39%	41%	6%	14%
Redfield & Wilton Strategies	December 28–30, 2023	832 (LV)	–	37%	39%	9%	15%
Redfield & Wilton Strategies	November 27–29, 2023	874 (LV)	–	38%	39%	9%	13%
Big Data Poll (R)	November 16–19, 2023	1,273 (RV)	± 2.7%	35%	40%	9%	16% (Note: "Another third party candidate" with 7%; "Would not vote" with 2%)
Big Data Poll (R)	November 16–19, 2023	1,200 (LV)	± 2.7%	36%	41%	8%	11% (Note: "Another third party candidate" with 6%; "Would not vote" with 1%)
The New York Times/Siena College	October 22 – November 3, 2023	616 (RV)	± 4.4%	31%	34%	26%	9%
The New York Times/Siena College	October 22 – November 3, 2023	616 (LV)	± 4.4%	34%	34%	25%	7%
Redfield & Wilton Strategies	October 7–9, 2023	820 (LV)	–	38%	40%	7%	15%

Joe Biden vs. Donald Trump vs. Robert F. Kennedy Jr. vs. Jill Stein

Poll source	Date(s) administered	Sample size	Margin of error	Joe Biden Democratic	Donald Trump Republican	Robert F. Kennedy Jr. Independent	Jill Stein Green	Other / Undecided
Public Policy Polling (D)	July 17–18, 2024	650 (RV)	± 3.9%	44%	45%	5%	3%	3%
Redfield & Wilton Strategies	July 16–18, 2024	437 (LV)	–	41%	42%	6%	1%	10%
Redfield & Wilton Strategies	July 8–10, 2024	465 (LV)	–	43%	42%	6%	0%	9%
Redfield & Wilton Strategies	June 8–11, 2024	719 (LV)	–	36%	37%	8%	1%	18%
Redfield & Wilton Strategies	May 2–4, 2024	650 (LV)	–	37%	43%	7%	1%	12%
CBS News/YouGov	April 19–25, 2024	1,262 (LV)	± 3.1%	45%	43%	9%	3%	0%
Big Data Poll (R)	March 26–30, 2024	1,218 (RV)	± 2.6%	40%	43%	10%	1%	6%
Big Data Poll (R)	March 26–30, 2024	1,218 (RV)	± 2.6%	42%	44%	11%	3%	–
Big Data Poll (R)	March 26–30, 2024	1,145 (LV)	± 2.6%	41%	44%	9%	1%	5%
Big Data Poll (R)	March 26–30, 2024	1,145 (LV)	± 2.6%	43%	44%	11%	2%	–

Joe Biden vs. Donald Trump vs. Robert F. Kennedy Jr. vs. Cornel West

Poll source	Date(s) administered	Sample size	Margin of error	Joe Biden Democratic	Donald Trump Republican	Robert F. Kennedy Jr. Independent	Cornel West Independent	Other / Undecided
CNN/SSRS	March 13–18, 2024	1,097 (RV)	± 3.6%	34%	40%	18%	4%	4%
CNN/SSRS	November 29 – December 6, 2023	1,197 (RV)	± 3.4%	31%	39%	20%	6%	4%
Bloomberg/Morning Consult	October 30 – November 7, 2023	700 (RV)	± 4.0%	38%	37%	10%	2%	13%

Joe Biden vs. Donald Trump vs. Cornel West

Poll source	Date(s) administered	Sample size	Margin of error	Joe Biden Democratic	Donald Trump Republican	Cornel West Green	Other / Undecided
Emerson College	August 1–2, 2023	1,121 (LV)	± 2.9%	41%	43%	4%	11%

Hypothetical polling with other candidates

Joe Biden vs. Robert F. Kennedy Jr.

Poll source	Date(s) administered	Sample size	Margin of error	Joe Biden Democratic	Robert F. Kennedy Jr. Independent	Other / Undecided
John Zogby Strategies	April 13–21, 2024	640 (LV)	–	45%	44%	11%

Robert F. Kennedy Jr. vs. Donald Trump

Poll source	Date(s) administered	Sample size	Margin of error	Robert F. Kennedy Jr. Independent	Donald Trump Republican	Other / Undecided
John Zogby Strategies	April 13–21, 2024	640 (LV)	–	42%	41%	17%

Gavin Newsom vs. Donald Trump

Poll source	Date(s) administered	Sample size	Margin of error	Gavin Newsom Democratic	Donald Trump Republican	Other / Undecided
Public Policy Polling (D)	July 11–12, 2024	568 (RV)	–	44%	45%	11%
Glengariff Group	January 2–6, 2024	600 (LV)	± 4.0%	40%	45%	15%

Gretchen Whitmer vs. Donald Trump

Poll source	Date(s) administered	Sample size	Margin of error	Gretchen Whitmer Democratic	Donald Trump Republican	Other / Undecided
Fox News	July 22–24, 2024	1,012 (RV)	± 3.0%	52%	46%	2%
Glengariff Group	July 22–24, 2024	600 (LV)	± 4.0%	43%	40%	17%
Public Policy Polling (D)	July 11–12, 2024	568 (RV)	–	52%	45%	3%
Emerson College/The Hill	Mar 14–18, 2024	1,000 (RV)	± 3.0%	50%	45%	5%
Glengariff Group	January 2–6, 2024	600 (LV)	± 4.0%	49%	45%	6%
Marketing Resource Group	October 2–8, 2023	600 (LV)	± 4.0%	47%	40%	13%

Gretchen Whitmer vs. Donald Trump vs. Robert F. Kennedy Jr. vs. Jill Stein

Poll source	Date(s) administered	Sample size	Margin of error	Gretchen Whitmer Democratic	Donald Trump Republican	Robert F. Kennedy Jr. Independent	Jill Stein Green	Other / Undecided
Public Policy Polling (D)	July 17–18, 2024	650 (RV)	± 3.9%	46%	45%	5%	1%	3%

JB Pritzker vs. Donald Trump

Poll source	Date(s) administered	Sample size	Margin of error	JB Pritzker Democratic	Donald Trump Republican	Other / Undecided
Public Policy Polling (D)	July 11–12, 2024	568 (RV)	–	39%	45%	16%

Josh Shapiro vs. Donald Trump

Poll source	Date(s) administered	Sample size	Margin of error	Josh Shapiro Democratic	Donald Trump Republican	Other / Undecided
Fox News	July 22–24, 2024	1,012 (RV)	± 3.0%	47%	48%	5%
Public Policy Polling (D)	July 11–12, 2024	568 (RV)	–	43%	46%	11%

Pete Buttigieg vs. Donald Trump

Poll source	Date(s) administered	Sample size	Margin of error	Pete Buttigieg Democratic	Donald Trump Republican	Other / Undecided
Public Policy Polling (D)	July 11–12, 2024	568 (RV)	–	43%	48%	9%

Joe Biden vs. Nikki Haley

Poll source	Date(s) administered	Sample size	Margin of error	Joe Biden Democratic	Nikki Haley Republican	Other / Undecided
Fox News	February 8–12, 2024	1,106 (RV)	± 3.0%	42%	43%	15%
Glengariff Group	January 2–6, 2024	600 (LV)	± 4.0%	34%	44%	22%
CNN/SSRS	November 29 – December 6, 2023	1,197 (RV)	± 3.4%	38%	50%	12%
EPIC-MRA	November 10–16, 2023	600 (LV)	± 4.0%	36%	47%	17%
The New York Times/Siena College	October 22 – November 3, 2023	616 (RV)	± 4.4%	35%	45%	20%
The New York Times/Siena College	October 22 – November 3, 2023	616 (LV)	± 4.4%	36%	46%	18%

Joe Biden vs. Nikki Haley vs. Robert F. Kennedy Jr. vs. Cornel West. vs. Jill Stein

Poll source	Date(s) administered	Sample size	Margin of error	Joe Biden Democratic	Nikki Haley Republican	Robert F. Kennedy Jr. Independent	Cornel West Independent	Jill Stein Green	Other / Undecided
Fox News	February 8–12, 2024	1,106 (RV)	± 3.0%	35%	26%	23%	3%	3%	33%

Joe Biden vs. Nikki Haley vs. Robert F. Kennedy Jr.

Poll source	Date(s) administered	Sample size	Margin of error	Joe Biden Democratic	Nikki Haley Republican	Robert F. Kennedy Jr. Independent	Other / Undecided
Redfield & Wilton Strategies	November 27–29, 2023	874 (LV)	–	37%	25%	18%	20%

Joe Biden vs. Ron DeSantis

Poll source	Date(s) administered	Sample size	Margin of error	Joe Biden Democratic	Ron DeSantis Republican	Other / Undecided
CNN/SSRS	November 29 – December 6, 2023	1,197 (RV)	± 3.4%	42%	49%	9%
The New York Times/Siena College	October 22 – November 3, 2023	616 (RV)	± 4.4%	42%	42%	16%
The New York Times/Siena College	October 22 – November 3, 2023	616 (LV)	± 4.4%	44%	43%	13%
Susquehanna Polling & Research	September 7–12, 2023	700 (RV)	± 3.7%	48%	42%	10%
Mitchell Research	July 11–13, 2023	639 (LV)	± 4.0%	44%	31%	25%
Public Opinion Strategies (R)	July 8–10, 2023	500 (RV)	± 4.38%	44%	46%	7%
EPIC-MRA	June 8–14, 2023	600 (LV)	± 4.0%	44%	45%	11%
Public Opinion Strategies (R)	April 17–19, 2023	500 (LV)	± 4.4%	43%	45%	12%

Joe Biden vs. Ron DeSantis vs. Robert F. Kennedy Jr.

Poll source	Date(s) administered	Sample size	Margin of error	Joe Biden Democratic	Ron DeSantis Republican	Robert F. Kennedy Jr. Independent	Other	Undecided
Redfield & Wilton Strategies	November 27–29, 2023	874 (LV)	–	39%	30%	13%	2%	15%

=== Results ===
State Senate district results

State House district results

Trump secured Michigan with 49.7% of the vote, winning 74 counties out of 83, including Macomb County, the third-most populous in the state. Conversely, Harris won seven out of Michigan's 10 most populous counties, including Wayne County, the state's largest.

2024 United States presidential election in Michigan
Party	Candidate	Votes	%	±%
Republican	Donald Trump; JD Vance	2,816,636	49.73%	+1.89
Democratic	Kamala Harris; Tim Walz	2,736,533	48.31%	−2.31
Green	Jill Stein; Butch Ware	44,607	0.79%	+0.54
Natural Law	Robert F. Kennedy Jr. (withdrawn); Nicole Shanahan (withdrawn)	26,785	0.47%	+0.42
Libertarian	Chase Oliver; Mike ter Maat	22,440	0.40%	−0.69
Independent	Cornel West; Melina Abdullah	6,664	0.12%	N/A
U.S. Taxpayers'	Randall Terry; Stephen Broden	6,509	0.11%	0.00
Independent	Joseph Kishore (Note: Kishore and White are affiliated with the Socialist Equality Party on a national level, which does not have ballot access in Michigan.); Jerry White	2,330	0.04%	N/A
Write-in		1,682	0.03%	N/A
Total votes		5,664,186	100.0%	
Republican gain from Democratic				

==== By county ====
County	Donald Trump Republican		Kamala Harris Democratic		Various candidates Other parties		Margin		Total
County	#	%	#	%	#	%	#	%	Total
Alcona	5,257	70.25%	2,140	28.60%	86	1.15%	3,117	41.65%	7,483
Alger	3,116	59.26%	2,075	39.46%	67	1.27%	1,041	19.80%	5,258
Allegan	45,206	62.86%	25,637	35.65%	1,070	1.49%	19,569	27.21%	71,913
Alpena	10,967	63.71%	6,038	35.08%	208	1.21%	4,929	28.64%	17,213
Antrim	10,341	61.25%	6,330	37.49%	212	1.26%	4,011	23.76%	16,883
Arenac	6,379	69.65%	2,662	29.07%	117	1.28%	3,717	40.59%	9,158
Baraga	2,779	64.15%	1,488	34.35%	65	1.50%	1,291	29.80%	4,332
Barry	25,650	66.41%	12,391	32.08%	584	1.51%	13,259	34.33%	38,625
Bay	34,792	56.72%	25,767	42.01%	779	1.27%	9,025	14.71%	61,338
Benzie	6,895	53.67%	5,780	44.99%	171	1.33%	1,115	8.68%	12,846
Berrien	44,975	53.23%	38,323	45.36%	1,190	1.41%	6,652	7.87%	84,488
Branch	14,848	70.41%	5,911	28.03%	330	1.56%	8,937	42.38%	21,089
Calhoun	38,606	56.36%	28,988	42.32%	911	1.33%	9,618	14.04%	68,505
Cass	18,505	66.40%	9,050	32.47%	316	1.13%	9,455	33.92%	27,871
Charlevoix	10,183	57.66%	7,197	40.75%	281	1.59%	2,986	16.91%	17,661
Cheboygan	10,653	64.87%	5,543	33.75%	227	1.38%	5,110	31.11%	16,423
Chippewa	11,249	61.25%	6,796	37.01%	320	1.74%	4,453	24.25%	18,365
Clare	11,772	68.09%	5,273	30.50%	243	1.41%	6,499	37.59%	17,288
Clinton	26,751	53.52%	22,450	44.91%	785	1.57%	4,301	8.60%	49,986
Crawford	5,613	66.22%	2,752	32.47%	111	1.31%	2,861	33.75%	8,476
Delta	14,109	64.50%	7,462	34.11%	303	1.39%	6,647	30.39%	21,874
Dickinson	10,324	67.42%	4,763	31.11%	225	1.47%	5,561	36.32%	15,312
Eaton	33,102	50.76%	31,056	47.63%	1,050	1.61%	2,046	3.14%	65,208
Emmet	12,465	54.55%	10,005	43.78%	381	1.67%	2,460	10.77%	22,851
Genesee	105,303	47.16%	114,670	51.36%	3,295	1.48%	-9,367	-4.20%	223,268
Gladwin	10,809	69.79%	4,501	29.06%	178	1.15%	6,308	40.73%	15,488
Gogebic	4,803	57.90%	3,385	40.81%	107	1.29%	1,418	17.09%	8,295
Grand Traverse	31,423	50.06%	30,339	48.33%	1,010	1.61%	1,084	1.73%	62,772
Gratiot	12,894	64.96%	6,682	33.67%	272	1.37%	6,212	31.30%	19,848
Hillsdale	18,631	75.04%	5,875	23.66%	322	1.30%	12,756	51.38%	24,828
Houghton	11,181	57.71%	7,881	40.68%	312	1.61%	3,300	17.03%	19,374
Huron	13,224	69.71%	5,522	29.11%	223	1.18%	7,702	40.60%	18,969
Ingham	50,564	34.14%	94,542	63.84%	2,995	2.02%	-43,978	-29.69%	148,101
Ionia	22,179	65.19%	11,338	33.33%	504	1.48%	10,841	31.87%	34,021
Iosco	10,155	64.55%	5,344	33.97%	232	1.47%	4,811	30.58%	15,731
Iron	4,501	64.05%	2,441	34.74%	85	1.21%	2,060	29.32%	7,027
Isabella	16,320	52.93%	14,011	45.44%	504	1.63%	2,309	7.49%	30,835
Jackson	50,199	59.88%	32,348	38.59%	1,280	1.53%	17,851	21.30%	83,827
Kalamazoo	58,671	40.27%	84,501	57.99%	2,538	1.74%	-25,830	-17.73%	145,710
Kalkaska	8,149	70.68%	3,206	27.81%	174	1.51%	4,943	42.87%	11,529
Kent	172,720	46.44%	192,668	51.80%	6,559	1.76%	-19,948	-5.36%	371,947
Keweenaw	896	55.62%	690	42.83%	25	1.55%	206	12.79%	1,611
Lake	4,523	65.41%	2,298	33.23%	94	1.36%	2,225	32.18%	6,915
Lapeer	38,398	69.26%	16,338	29.47%	703	1.27%	22,060	39.79%	55,439
Leelanau	8,035	45.43%	9,406	53.19%	244	1.38%	-1,371	-7.75%	17,685
Lenawee	33,463	60.82%	20,787	37.78%	766	1.39%	12,676	23.04%	55,016
Livingston	81,217	61.32%	49,503	37.38%	1,728	1.30%	31,714	23.94%	132,448
Luce	2,170	72.70%	769	25.76%	46	1.54%	1,401	46.93%	2,985
Mackinac	4,476	61.84%	2,675	36.96%	87	1.20%	1,801	24.88%	7,238
Macomb	284,660	55.91%	214,977	42.22%	9,515	1.87%	69,683	13.69%	509,152
Manistee	8,748	57.19%	6,309	41.24%	240	1.57%	2,439	15.94%	15,297
Marquette	17,459	44.76%	20,866	53.49%	684	1.75%	-3,407	-8.73%	39,009
Mason	10,830	59.95%	6,973	38.60%	261	1.44%	3,857	21.35%	18,064
Mecosta	14,445	64.23%	7,688	34.19%	356	1.58%	6,757	30.05%	22,489
Menominee	8,647	66.21%	4,256	32.59%	157	1.20%	4,391	33.62%	13,060
Midland	28,571	56.80%	20,926	41.60%	804	1.60%	7,645	15.20%	50,301
Missaukee	7,066	77.21%	1,945	21.25%	141	1.54%	5,121	55.95%	9,152
Monroe	57,405	62.84%	32,622	35.71%	1,329	1.45%	24,783	27.13%	91,356
Montcalm	23,946	68.72%	10,368	29.75%	531	1.52%	13,578	38.97%	34,845
Montmorency	4,599	71.96%	1,702	26.63%	90	1.41%	2,897	45.33%	6,391
Muskegon	47,733	50.15%	46,028	48.36%	1,420	1.49%	1,705	1.79%	95,181
Newaygo	20,630	70.65%	8,131	27.84%	440	1.51%	12,499	42.80%	29,201
Oakland	337,791	43.75%	419,519	54.33%	14,835	1.92%	-81,728	-10.58%	772,145
Oceana	9,547	64.20%	5,085	34.20%	238	1.60%	4,462	30.01%	14,870
Ogemaw	8,879	70.35%	3,578	28.35%	165	1.31%	5,301	42.00%	12,622
Ontonagon	2,479	64.54%	1,313	34.18%	49	1.28%	1,166	30.36%	3,841
Osceola	9,639	73.11%	3,326	25.23%	219	1.66%	6,313	47.88%	13,184
Oscoda	3,716	71.57%	1,414	27.23%	62	1.19%	2,302	44.34%	5,192
Otsego	10,693	66.95%	5,052	31.63%	226	1.42%	5,641	35.32%	15,971
Ottawa	106,133	59.46%	69,653	39.02%	2,721	1.52%	36,480	20.44%	178,507
Presque Isle	5,568	63.69%	3,036	34.73%	138	1.58%	2,532	28.96%	8,742
Roscommon	10,582	65.86%	5,290	32.92%	196	1.22%	5,292	32.94%	16,068
Saginaw	52,912	50.95%	49,515	47.68%	1,419	1.37%	3,397	3.27%	103,846
St. Clair	64,277	66.59%	30,844	31.95%	1,403	1.45%	33,433	34.64%	96,524
St. Joseph	19,403	66.21%	9,452	32.25%	452	1.54%	9,951	33.95%	29,307
Sanilac	17,080	73.18%	5,957	25.52%	302	1.29%	11,123	47.66%	23,339
Schoolcraft	3,196	65.25%	1,631	33.30%	71	1.45%	1,565	31.95%	4,898
Shiawassee	24,718	60.75%	15,335	37.69%	632	1.55%	9,383	23.06%	40,685
Tuscola	21,764	70.85%	8,562	27.87%	391	1.27%	13,202	42.98%	30,717
Van Buren	23,407	56.86%	17,175	41.72%	587	1.43%	6,232	15.14%	41,169
Washtenaw	58,844	26.56%	157,152	70.94%	5,546	2.50%	-98,308	-44.37%	221,542
Wayne	288,860	33.72%	537,032	62.69%	30,798	3.59%	-248,172	-28.97%	856,690
Wexford	12,968	66.58%	6,224	31.96%	284	1.46%	6,744	34.63%	19,476
Totals	2,816,636	49.73%	2,736,533	48.31%	111,017	1.96%	80,103	1.41%	5,664,186

Counties that flipped from Democratic to Republican

- Muskegon (largest municipality: Muskegon)
- Saginaw (largest municipality: Saginaw)

==== By congressional district ====
Trump won eight of 13 congressional districts, including one that elected a Democrat.

District	Harris	Trump	Representative
1st	38.67%	59.87%	Jack Bergman
2nd	34.21%	64.29%	John Moolenaar
3rd	53.07%	45.25%	Hillary Scholten
4th	46.47%	51.99%	Bill Huizenga
5th	35.78%	62.79%	Tim Walberg
6th	60.33%	37.04%	Debbie Dingell
7th	48.56%	49.84%	Elissa Slotkin (118th Congress)
7th	48.56%	49.84%	Tom Barrett (119th Congress)
8th	48.30%	50.28%	Dan Kildee (118th Congress)
8th	48.30%	50.28%	Kristen McDonald Rivet (119th Congress)
9th	33.17%	65.48%	Lisa McClain
10th	45.69%	52.24%	John James
11th	56.99%	40.91%	Haley Stevens
12th	66.56%	28.59%	Rashida Tlaib
13th	69.42%	28.36%	Shri Thanedar

== Analysis ==
This was the first time since 1988 in which Michigan voted more Republican than neighboring Wisconsin, and the first election since 1992 in which Michigan was not the most Democratic-leaning of the three Rust Belt swing states (including Wisconsin and Pennsylvania). Michigan shifted rightward by about 4.2 points from 2020, the strongest such shift in the three Rust Belt swing states.

Following the 2024 election, Michigan, Pennsylvania, and Wisconsin hold the longest active streak among states of voting for the winning presidential candidate, having done so in the last five presidential elections. In addition, the three states have voted for the same candidate in nine consecutive presidential elections. Trump's victory in the state made him the first Republican candidate to carry Michigan twice since Ronald Reagan did so in 1980 and 1984.

Trump became the first Republican candidate to win Michigan without carrying Kent County, home of Grand Rapids, since Charles Evans Hughes in 1916 and the first Republican to ever win the White House without it; Kent County had long been key to Republican victories in Michigan in past elections. Kent County and neighboring Ottawa County (which swung leftward) are plurality-Dutch ancestry.

Notably, Trump became the first Republican to win a plurality of the vote in Dearborn, home to a large Arab-American community, since 2000. This was part of Harris underperforming nationwide among voters of color (i.e. Hispanic voters, Asian voters, and Native American voters). Harris's loss in Dearborn has also been attributable to Biden's handling of the Gaza war.

Trump became the first Republican candidate to win Muskegon County and the Lower Peninsula since George H. W. Bush in 1988. He also became the first Republican candidate to win Michigan or the White House without carrying Leelanau County.

Though Harris carried Wayne County, her share of the vote was significantly poorer than Biden's had been in 2020, as it swung toward Trump by 9.2%. She similarly ceded ground across the state as a whole, earning a smaller percentage of the vote than Biden did in 2020 in all but seven counties, mostly concentrated in the northwestern areas of the Lower Peninsula. In addition to Wayne County, Trump also achieved significant swings in his favor in Cass, Genesee, and Lake counties, all of which have somewhat notable Black populations, as well as in Isabella and Macomb counties. Despite Trump winning the state, Democrat Elissa Slotkin narrowly won the 2024 United States Senate election in Michigan by 0.33%, in part due to some Trump voters not voting down-ballot. (Slotkin received about 25,000 fewer votes than Harris, while Republican Mike Rogers received about 120,000 fewer votes than Trump.)

Trump's best result came from rural inland Missaukee County, a county with large Dutch ancestry, while Harris recorded her strongest performance in Washtenaw County, home to the University of Michigan. Green Party candidate Stein did the best in Wayne County with 2.4% of the vote, likely owing to communities such as Dearborn and Hamtramck. This is the first time since 2008 that the Upper and Lower Peninsula voted the same way, the first time since 1988 that the latter voted Republican, and the first time since 1984 that both of them voted Republican.

=== Exit poll data ===
CNN conducted an exit poll in Michigan for both the presidential race and concurrent U.S. Senate race. They surveyed 2,855 voters across the state.

2024 presidential election in Michigan voter demographics (CNN)
Demographic subgroup	Trump	Harris	% of total vote
Ideology
Liberals	6	93	25
Moderates	40	57	41
Conservatives	91	8	34
Party
Democrats	5	95	31
Republicans	94	5	34
Independents	46	50	35
Gender
Men	55	43	45
Women	46	52	55
Race
White	54	44	78
Black	11	87	11
Latino	58	37	6
Asian	N/A	N/A	1
All other races	59	37	3
Education
Never attended college	66	32	16
Some college	45	53	29
Associate degree	58	38	17
Bachelor's degree	46	52	21
Advanced degree	39	59	17
Gender by race
White men	59	39	34
White women	51	47	44
Black men	13	86	5
Black women	10	88	7
Latino men	N/A	N/A	3
Latina women	N/A	N/A	3
All other races	54	42	4
Area type
Urban	31	67	21
Suburban	53	45	58
Rural	58	39	22
Income
<$30,000	42	58	11
$30,000–$49,999	46	50	17
$50,000–$99,999	50	48	31
$100,000–$199,999	51	47	30
≥$200,000	52	48	11
Most important issue
Democracy	17	82	34
Economy	79	18	27
Abortion	34	65	17
Immigration	91	9	12
Foreign policy	N/A	N/A	4
Biden job approval
Strongly approve	2	97	17
Somewhat approve	8	91	24
Somewhat disapprove	38	58	11
Strongly disapprove	93	5	45
Abortion should be:
Legal in all cases	14	84	33
Legal in most cases	48	50	35
Illegal in most cases	91	6	24
Illegal in all cases	N/A	N/A	5
Democracy in the United States is:
Very threatened	51	47	34
Somewhat threatened	52	47	37
Somewhat secure	41	56	20
Very secure	54	45	7
First time voting?
Yes	N/A	N/A	5
No	49	49	95
U.S. support for Israel is:
Too strong	37	61	29
Not strong enough	80	16	27
About right	40	59	37
Union household?
Yes	41	57	22
No	52	45	78
Gretchen Whitmer job approval
Approve	11	88	49
Disapprove	92	6	48

== See also ==
- United States presidential elections in Michigan
- 2024 Democratic Party presidential primaries
- 2024 Republican Party presidential primaries
- 2024 United States elections

== Notes ==
Partisan clients
