= 1988 United States presidential election in Michigan =

- November 8, 1988

All 20 Michigan votes to the Electoral College
- Turnout: 55.3% ▼4.0 pp

Nominee	George H. W. Bush	Michael Dukakis
Party	Republican	Democratic
Home state	Texas	Massachusetts
Running mate	Dan Quayle	Lloyd Bentsen
Electoral vote	20	0
Popular vote	1,965,486	1,675,783
Percentage	53.57%	45.67%

Bush
40–50%
50–60%
60–70%
70–80%
80–90%
90–100%
Dukakis
50–60%
60–70%
70–80%
80–90%
90–100%
President before election
Ronald Reagan
Republican
Elected President
George H. W. Bush
Republican

The 1988 United States presidential election in Michigan took place on November 8, 1988. All 50 states and the District of Columbia participated in the 1988 United States presidential election. Voters chose 20 electors to the Electoral College, which selected the president and vice president. Michigan was won by incumbent United States vice president George H. W. Bush of Texas, who was running against Massachusetts governor Michael Dukakis. Bush ran with Indiana senator Dan Quayle as vice president, and Dukakis ran with Texas senator Lloyd Bentsen.

Michigan weighed in for this election as 0.1% more Republican than the national average. This was the last time Michigan voted Republican until Donald Trump's plurality win in 2016, and remains the last time that a Republican won a majority of the vote in the state. This is also the last time Michigan, along with Pennsylvania, would vote differently to fellow Rust Belt swing state Wisconsin, as all three had Democratic winning streaks from 1992 to 2012, with all three states flipping simultaneously in 2016, 2020, and 2024 as well as the last time Michigan was the most Republican-leaning of the three Rust Belt swing states. Typical for elections in the 1980s, the Upper Peninsula of Michigan turned out mainly Democratic, and the Lower Peninsula turned out mainly Republican, with the notable exception of Detroit's highly populated Wayne County, which voted mainly Democratic.

As of the 2024, this is the last election in which Ingham County and Kalamazoo County voted for a Republican presidential candidate, and the last time Saginaw County did not vote for the statewide winner. This was the last time until 2016 that Isabella County voted Republican. This was also the last time until 2024 that Michigan voted to the right of neighboring Wisconsin, that Muskegon County voted Republican, and that the Lower Peninsula voted Republican.

== Caucuses ==
The Republican presidential caucuses were held on January 14, 1988. George H. W. Bush won Michigan. The Democratic presidential caucuses were held on March 26, 1988, in Michigan. Jesse Jackson won Michigan.

== Results ==
1988 United States presidential election in Michigan
Party	Candidate	Votes	%
Republican	George H. W. Bush	1,965,486	53.57%
Democratic	Michael Dukakis	1,675,783	45.67%
Libertarian	Ron Paul	18,336	0.50%
Independent (Note: Affiliated with the New Alliance Party nationally but listed as "No Party Affiliation" on the ballot in Michigan.)	Lenora Fulani	2,513	0.07%
Independent	Eugene McCarthy	2,497	0.07%
Workers League	Edward Winn	1,958	0.05%
Independent (Note: Affiliated with the Socialist Workers Party nationally but listed as "No Party Affiliation" on the ballot in Michigan.)	James Warren	819	0.02%
Independent (Note: Affiliated with the Workers World nationally but listed as "No Party Affiliation" on the ballot in Michigan.)	Larry Holmes	804	0.02%
Independent	David Duke (write-in)	60	0.00%
Independent	Earl Dodge (write-in)	5	0.00%
Write-ins	Scattering	902	0.02%
Total votes		3,669,163	100.00%

=== Results by county ===
County	George H.W. Bush Republican		Michael Dukakis Democratic		Various candidates Other parties		Margin		Total votes cast
County	#	%	#	%	#	%	#	%	Total votes cast
Alcona	2,966	60.47%	1,918	39.10%	21	0.43%	1,048	21.37%	4,905
Alger	1,830	45.08%	2,210	54.45%	19	0.47%	-380	-9.37%	4,059
Allegan	22,163	66.78%	10,785	32.50%	240	0.72%	11,378	34.28%	33,188
Alpena	6,664	51.05%	6,341	48.58%	49	0.38%	323	2.47%	13,054
Antrim	5,231	61.95%	3,159	37.41%	54	0.64%	2,072	24.54%	8,444
Arenac	3,064	48.63%	3,211	50.97%	25	0.40%	-147	-2.34%	6,300
Baraga	1,630	47.88%	1,753	51.50%	21	0.62%	-123	-3.62%	3,404
Barry	12,546	60.66%	7,983	38.60%	152	0.73%	4,563	22.06%	20,681
Bay	20,710	42.13%	28,225	57.42%	217	0.44%	-7,515	-15.29%	49,152
Benzie	3,240	56.52%	2,437	42.52%	55	0.96%	803	14.00%	5,732
Berrien	37,799	62.81%	21,948	36.47%	436	0.72%	15,851	26.34%	60,183
Branch	9,225	63.48%	5,231	36.00%	75	0.52%	3,994	27.48%	14,531
Calhoun	26,771	53.77%	22,717	45.63%	299	0.60%	4,054	8.14%	49,787
Cass	10,229	57.61%	7,444	41.92%	83	0.47%	2,785	15.69%	17,756
Charlevoix	5,802	59.43%	3,875	39.69%	85	0.87%	1,927	19.74%	9,762
Cheboygan	5,395	57.52%	3,943	42.04%	42	0.45%	1,452	15.48%	9,380
Chippewa	6,786	56.23%	5,222	43.27%	60	0.50%	1,564	12.96%	12,068
Clare	5,661	54.18%	4,710	45.08%	77	0.74%	951	9.10%	10,448
Clinton	15,497	62.39%	9,225	37.14%	115	0.46%	6,272	25.25%	24,837
Crawford	3,097	62.28%	1,825	36.70%	51	1.03%	1,272	25.58%	4,973
Delta	7,114	44.28%	8,891	55.34%	60	0.37%	-1,777	-11.06%	16,065
Dickinson	6,158	49.89%	6,129	49.66%	56	0.45%	29	0.23%	12,343
Eaton	24,193	60.78%	15,322	38.49%	291	0.73%	8,871	22.29%	39,806
Emmet	7,105	62.40%	4,170	36.62%	111	0.97%	2,935	25.78%	11,386
Genesee	70,922	40.10%	104,880	59.30%	1,057	0.60%	-33,958	-19.20%	176,859
Gladwin	4,746	52.83%	4,164	46.35%	73	0.81%	582	6.48%	8,983
Gogebic	3,509	40.38%	5,151	59.27%	31	0.36%	-1,642	-18.89%	8,691
Grand Traverse	17,191	62.46%	10,098	36.69%	236	0.86%	7,093	25.77%	27,525
Gratiot	8,447	59.36%	5,719	40.19%	64	0.45%	2,728	19.17%	14,230
Hillsdale	10,571	68.29%	4,763	30.77%	145	0.94%	5,808	37.52%	15,479
Houghton	7,098	51.83%	6,510	47.54%	86	0.63%	588	4.29%	13,694
Huron	9,419	61.91%	5,714	37.56%	81	0.53%	3,705	24.35%	15,214
Ingham	58,363	50.56%	55,984	48.50%	1,088	0.94%	2,379	2.06%	115,435
Ionia	12,028	59.05%	8,160	40.06%	181	0.89%	3,868	18.99%	20,369
Iosco	7,234	59.17%	4,929	40.32%	62	0.51%	2,305	18.85%	12,225
Iron	2,866	42.94%	3,774	56.55%	34	0.51%	-908	-13.61%	6,674
Isabella	10,362	56.07%	7,960	43.07%	160	0.87%	2,402	13.00%	18,482
Jackson	33,885	60.37%	21,865	38.96%	377	0.67%	12,020	21.41%	56,127
Kalamazoo	50,205	55.64%	39,457	43.73%	573	0.64%	10,748	11.91%	90,235
Kalkaska	3,369	61.21%	2,092	38.01%	43	0.78%	1,277	23.20%	5,504
Kent	131,910	63.77%	73,467	35.52%	1,465	0.71%	58,443	28.25%	206,842
Keweenaw	536	45.81%	631	53.93%	3	0.26%	-95	-8.12%	1,170
Lake	1,713	46.32%	1,958	52.95%	27	0.73%	-245	-6.63%	3,698
Lapeer	16,670	60.19%	10,736	38.76%	291	1.05%	5,934	21.43%	27,697
Leelanau	5,215	60.51%	3,331	38.65%	73	0.85%	1,884	21.86%	8,619
Lenawee	19,115	57.84%	13,690	41.42%	243	0.74%	5,425	16.42%	33,048
Livingston	31,331	68.79%	13,749	30.19%	466	1.02%	17,582	38.60%	45,546
Luce	1,528	63.22%	864	35.75%	25	1.03%	664	27.47%	2,417
Mackinac	3,127	59.65%	2,093	39.93%	22	0.42%	1,034	19.72%	5,242
Macomb	175,632	60.33%	112,856	38.77%	2,627	0.90%	62,776	21.56%	291,115
Manistee	5,368	52.58%	4,765	46.67%	77	0.75%	603	5.91%	10,210
Marquette	11,704	42.92%	15,418	56.54%	145	0.53%	-3,714	-13.62%	27,267
Mason	6,800	59.58%	4,531	39.70%	82	0.72%	2,269	19.88%	11,413
Mecosta	8,181	63.02%	4,736	36.48%	64	0.49%	3,445	26.54%	12,981
Menominee	5,440	52.28%	4,918	47.26%	48	0.46%	522	5.02%	10,406
Midland	19,994	59.12%	13,452	39.78%	371	1.10%	6,542	19.34%	33,817
Missaukee	3,566	68.26%	1,621	31.03%	37	0.71%	1,945	37.23%	5,224
Monroe	26,189	54.19%	21,847	45.21%	288	0.60%	4,342	8.98%	48,324
Montcalm	10,963	58.46%	7,664	40.87%	127	0.68%	3,299	17.59%	18,754
Montmorency	2,514	61.32%	1,563	38.12%	23	0.56%	951	23.20%	4,100
Muskegon	33,567	53.36%	28,977	46.06%	363	0.58%	4,590	7.30%	62,907
Newaygo	9,896	64.32%	5,389	35.03%	100	0.65%	4,507	29.29%	15,385
Oakland	283,359	61.27%	174,745	37.78%	4,384	0.95%	108,614	23.49%	462,488
Oceana	5,693	62.46%	3,356	36.82%	65	0.71%	2,337	25.64%	9,114
Ogemaw	4,091	50.20%	4,012	49.23%	47	0.58%	79	0.97%	8,150
Ontonagon	2,023	44.34%	2,517	55.17%	22	0.48%	-494	-10.83%	4,562
Osceola	5,218	64.25%	2,860	35.22%	43	0.53%	2,358	29.03%	8,121
Oscoda	1,972	62.27%	1,170	36.94%	25	0.79%	802	25.33%	3,167
Otsego	4,620	63.31%	2,635	36.11%	43	0.59%	1,985	27.20%	7,298
Ottawa	61,515	76.20%	18,769	23.25%	445	0.55%	42,746	52.95%	80,729
Presque Isle	3,614	54.11%	3,025	45.29%	40	0.60%	589	8.82%	6,679
Roscommon	5,866	56.93%	4,394	42.65%	43	0.42%	1,472	14.28%	10,303
Saginaw	42,401	47.88%	45,616	51.51%	549	0.62%	-3,215	-3.63%	88,566
Sanilac	10,653	65.73%	5,445	33.60%	109	0.67%	5,208	32.13%	16,207
Schoolcraft	1,802	46.37%	2,071	53.29%	13	0.33%	-269	-6.92%	3,886
Shiawassee	15,506	53.94%	13,056	45.42%	186	0.65%	2,450	8.52%	28,748
St. Clair	32,336	60.26%	20,909	38.97%	413	0.77%	11,427	21.29%	53,658
St. Joseph	13,084	64.79%	7,017	34.74%	95	0.47%	6,067	30.05%	20,196
Tuscola	12,093	56.90%	9,060	42.63%	101	0.48%	3,033	14.27%	21,254
Van Buren	14,522	57.17%	10,668	42.00%	210	0.83%	3,854	15.17%	25,400
Washtenaw	55,029	46.67%	61,799	52.41%	1,092	0.93%	-6,770	-5.74%	117,920
Wayne	291,996	39.03%	450,222	60.18%	5,938	0.79%	-158,226	-21.15%	748,156
Wexford	6,043	58.07%	4,287	41.20%	76	0.73%	1,756	16.87%	10,406
Totals	1,965,486	53.57%	1,675,783	45.67%	27,894	0.76%	289,703	7.90%	3,669,163

==== Counties that flipped from Republican to Democratic ====
- Alger
- Arenac
- Baraga
- Bay
- Delta
- Genesee
- Lake
- Marquette
- Ontonagon
- Saginaw
- Schoolcraft
- Washtenaw

== See also ==
- Presidency of George H. W. Bush
- United States presidential elections in Michigan
