= Sweetwater Township, Michigan =

- Civil township
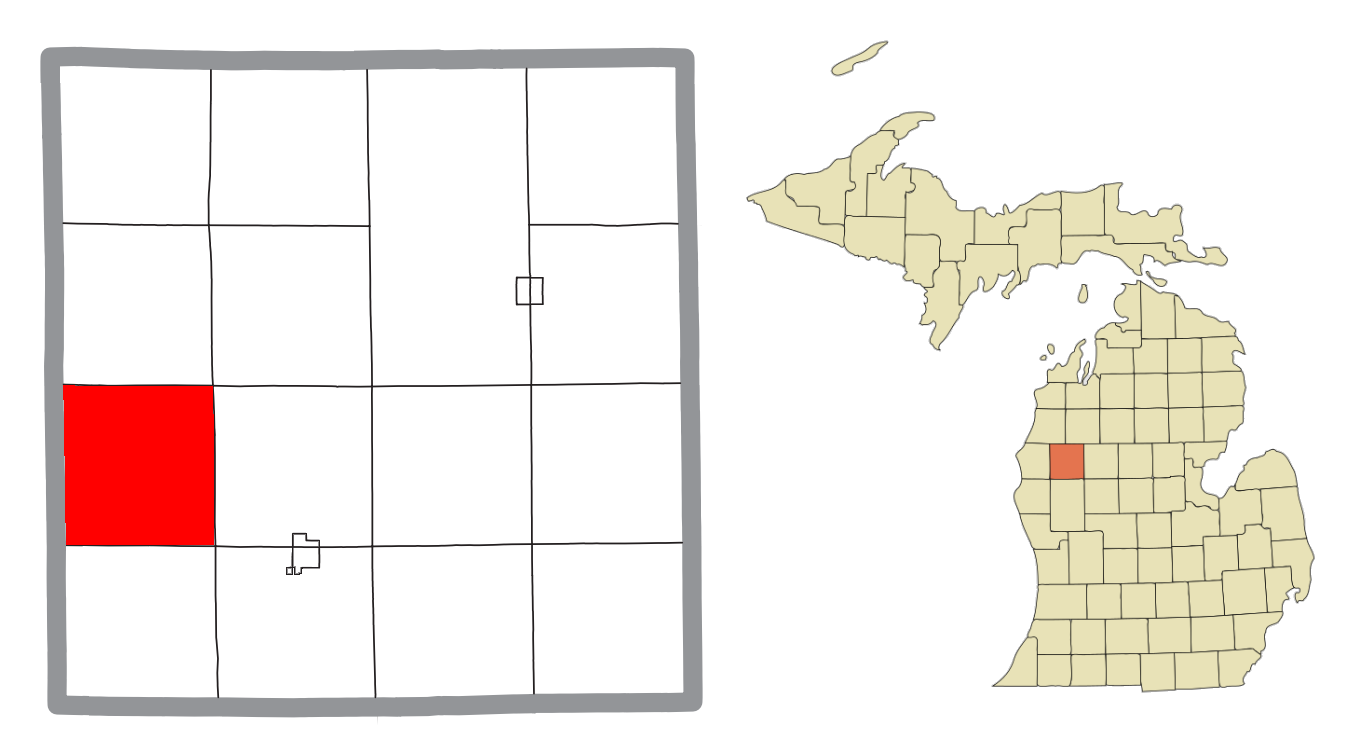
- Location within Lake County

- Location within the state of Michigan Location within the United States
- Coordinates: 43°57′03″N 85°58′39″W
- Country: United States
- State: Michigan
- County: Lake

Area
  - Total: 35.8 sq mi (92.7 km^{2})
  - Land: 35.7 sq mi (92.5 km^{2})
  - Water: 0.077 sq mi (0.2 km^{2})
- Elevation: 892 ft (272 m)

Population (2020)
  - Total: 258
  - Density: 7.22/sq mi (2.79/km^{2})
- Time zone: UTC-5 (Eastern (EST))
  - Summer (DST): UTC-4 (EDT)
- ZIP code(s): 49304 (Baldwin); 49402 (Branch)
- FIPS code: 26-77740
- GNIS feature ID: 1627146

Sweetwater Township is a civil township of Lake County in the U.S. state of Michigan. The population was 258 at the 2020 census.

== Communities ==
- Branch is an unincorporated community on US 10 on the boundary between Mason County and Lake County at 43°56′45″N 86°02′21″W. The community shares its name with Branch Township in Mason County, but is also within Sweetwater Township in Lake County. It was founded about 1873 by Benjamin F. Barnett, who built a lumbermen's hotel. The Pere Marquette Railway later ran the hotel and made it a station. Barnett became the first postmaster of Branch, in Mason County, on February 1, 1876, named for the township, which in turn is named for the north branch of the Pere Marquette River. On October 1, 1962, the post office was transferred to Lake County. The Branch ZIP code 49402 serves most of Sweetwater township, as well as in Lake County, the western parts of Sauble Township and Lake Township and a small area of Webber Township. In Mason County, the ZIP code serves the eastern parts of Branch Township and Sheridan Township, most of Logan Township, and small areas of Meade Township, Eden Township, and Custer Township and a small area of Colfax Township in Oceana County.
- Baldwin is to the southeast, and the Baldwin ZIP code 49304 also serves a small area in southeast Sweetwater Township.

== Geography ==
According to the United States Census Bureau, the township has a total area of 35.8 square miles (93 km^{2}), of which 35.7 square miles (92 km^{2}) is land and 0.1 square miles (0.26 km^{2}) (0.20%) is water.

== Demographics ==
As of the census of 2000, there were 238 people, 116 households, and 74 families residing in the township. The population density was 6.7 per square mile (2.6/km^{2}). There were 352 housing units at an average density of 9.9 per square mile (3.8/km^{2}). The racial makeup of the township was 94.54% White, 2.52% African American, 0.42% Native American, and 2.52% from two or more races. Hispanic or Latino of any race were 1.26% of the population.

There were 116 households, out of which 13.8% had children under the age of 18 living with them, 52.6% were married couples living together, 5.2% had a female householder with no husband present, and 36.2% were non-families. 31.0% of all households were made up of individuals, and 11.2% had someone living alone who was 65 years of age or older. The average household size was 2.05 and the average family size was 2.51.

In the township the population was spread out, with 16.0% under the age of 18, 6.7% from 18 to 24, 18.5% from 25 to 44, 34.0% from 45 to 64, and 24.8% who were 65 years of age or older. The median age was 52 years. For every 100 females, there were 112.5 males. For every 100 females age 18 and over, there were 115.1 males.

The median income for a household in the township was $24,107, and the median income for a family was $26,667. Males had a median income of $31,042 versus $21,250 for females. The per capita income for the township was $12,037. About 11.5% of families and 18.5% of the population were below the poverty line, including 38.0% of those under the age of eighteen and 6.1% of those 65 or over.
