= Dover Township, Michigan =

Dover Township may refer to places in the U.S. state of Michigan:

- Dover Township, Lake County, Michigan
- Dover Township, Lenawee County, Michigan
- Dover Township, Otsego County, Michigan

== See also ==
- Dover, Michigan (disambiguation)
- Dover Township (disambiguation)
