= Eden Township, Lake County, Michigan =

Eden Township, Michigan
- Civil township
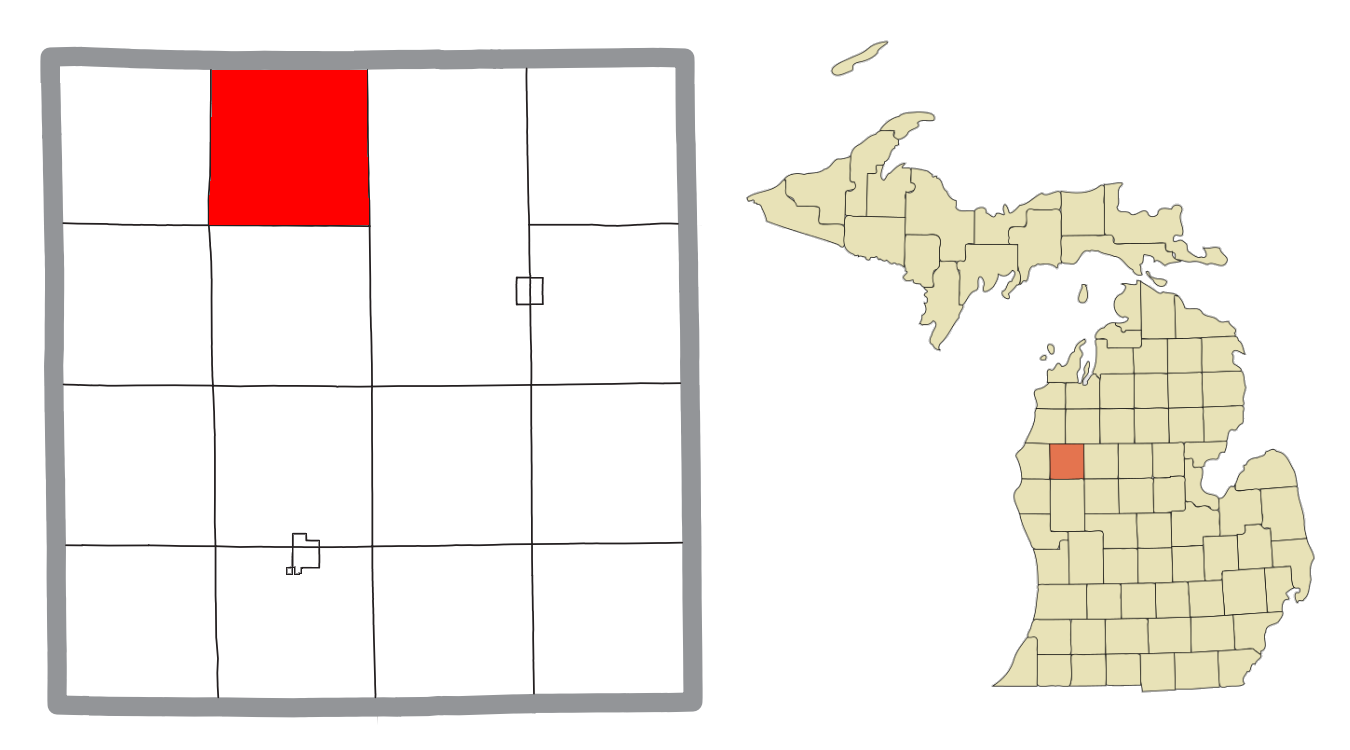
- Location within Lake County

- Location within the state of Michigan Location within the United States
- Coordinates: 44°07′15″N 85°51′31″W
- Country: United States
- State: Michigan
- County: Lake

Area
  - Total: 36.5 sq mi (94.6 km^{2})
  - Land: 36.4 sq mi (94.2 km^{2})
  - Water: 0.15 sq mi (0.4 km^{2})
- Elevation: 981 ft (299 m)

Population (2020)
  - Total: 469
  - Density: 12.9/sq mi (4.98/km^{2})
- Time zone: UTC-5 (Eastern (EST))
  - Summer (DST): UTC-4 (EDT)
- ZIP code(s): 49644 (Irons); 49656 (Luther)
- FIPS code: 26-24800
- GNIS feature ID: 1626216
- Website: https://www.edentownship-ironsmi.com/

Eden Township is a civil township of Lake County in the U.S. state of Michigan. The population was 469 at the 2020 census.

== Communities ==
- Ferndale was the name of a post office in this township from 1884 until 1885.
- Irons is an unincorporated community in the northeast part of the township at 44°08′24″N 85°54′57″W near the boundary with Elk Township. In 1894 it was a station on the Chicago and West Michigan Railway (later the Pere Marquette Railway). It was platted in about 1909 by A. Glen Haslett and G.E. Hilderbrand. It was named for the Irons family, who were early settlers. A post office was established in July 1910. The Irons ZIP code, 49644, serves almost the entire township as well as all of Elk Township to the west, and a small portion in the northeast corner of Meade Township to the west of Elk; a small portion in the southwest part of Norman Township to the north of Elk; an area along the northwest corner of Newkirk Township to the east of Eden; the northwest part of Peacock Township to the south of Eden; and the northern and eastern portions of Sauble Township to the southwest of Eden.
- Luther is to the southeast, and the Luther ZIP code, 49656, serves the southeast corner of the township.

== Geography ==
According to the United States Census Bureau, the township has a total area of 36.5 square miles (95 km^{2}), of which 36.4 square miles (94 km^{2}) is land and 0.2 square miles (0.52 km^{2}) (0.41%) is water.

== Demographics ==
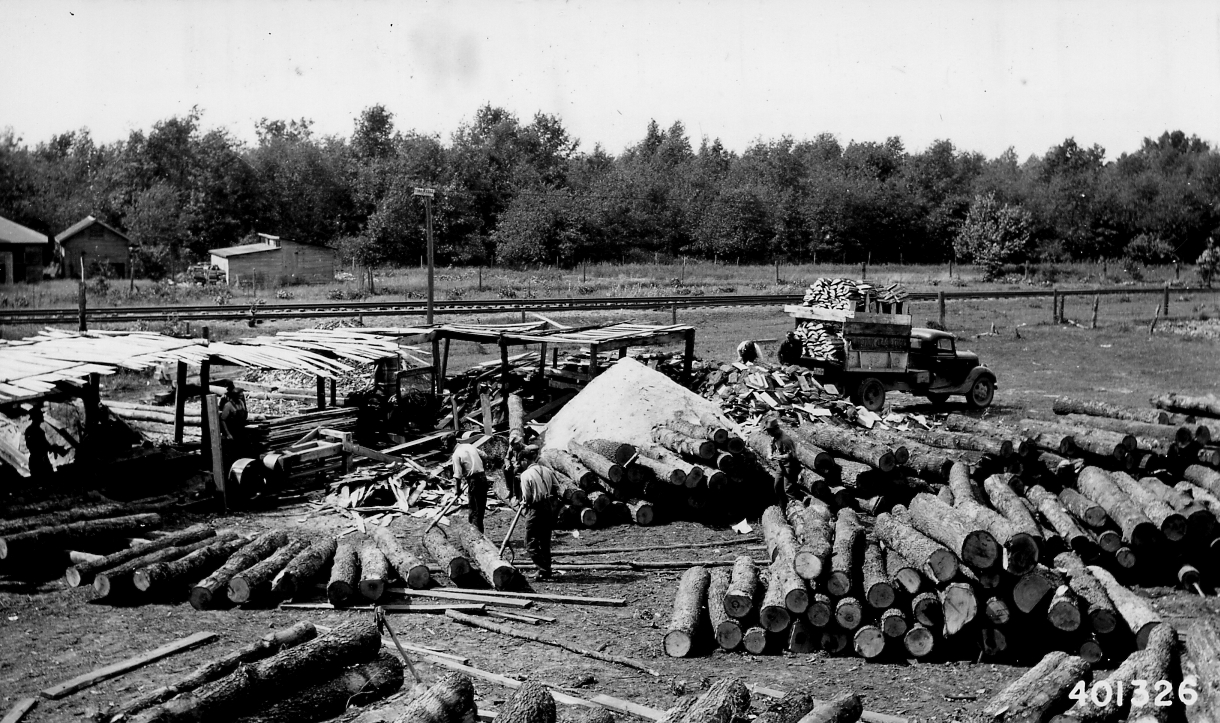
Charles Merrill Tie Mill at Irons, Michigan (1940)

As of the census of 2000, there were 377 people, 178 households, and 114 families residing in the township. The population density was 10.4 inhabitants per square mile (4.0/km^{2}). There were 692 housing units at an average density of 19.0 units per square mile (7.3 units/km^{2}). The racial makeup of the township was 96.82% White, 0.53% African American, 0.80% Native American, and 1.86% from two or more races.

There were 178 households, out of which 18.5% had children under the age of 18 living with them, 52.2% were married couples living together, 5.1% had a female householder with no husband present, and 35.4% were non-families. 28.7% of all households were made up of individuals, and 10.1% had someone living alone who was 65 years of age or older. The average household size was 2.12 and the average family size was 2.53.

In the township the population was spread out, with 16.4% under the age of 18, 6.1% from 18 to 24, 21.0% from 25 to 44, 36.6% from 45 to 64, and 19.9% who were 65 years of age or older. The median age was 49 years. For every 100 females, there were 104.9 males. For every 100 females age 18 and over, there were 112.8 males.

The median income for a household in the township was $23,646, and the median income for a family was $27,188. Males had a median income of $35,469 versus $15,625 for females. The per capita income for the township was $12,895. About 19.4% of families and 25.9% of the population were below the poverty line, including 38.2% of those under age 18 and 12.3% of those age 65 or over.
