= Sheridan Township, Mason County, Michigan =

Sheridan Township, Michigan
- Civil township
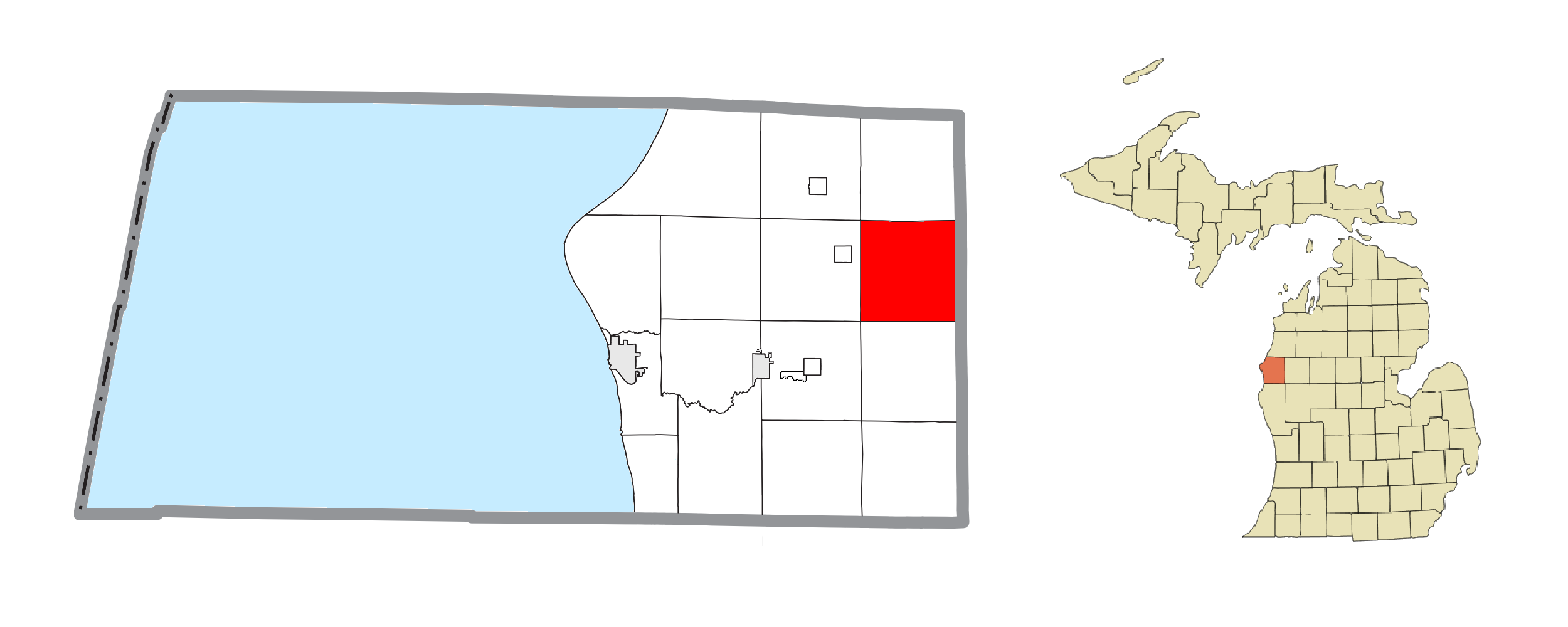
- Location within Mason County

- Location within Michigan Location within the United States
- Coordinates: 44°01′32″N 86°06′39″W
- Country: United States
- State: Michigan
- County: Mason
- Established: 1889

Government
  - Supervisor: Kelly Crocker
  - Clerk: Marlynn Gulembo

Area
  - Total: 35.93 sq mi (93.1 km^{2})
  - Land: 34.27 sq mi (88.8 km^{2})
  - Water: 1.66 sq mi (4.3 km^{2})
- Elevation: 719 ft (219 m)

Population (2020)
  - Total: 1,044
  - Density: 30.5/sq mi (11.8/km^{2})
- Time zone: UTC-5 (Eastern (EST))
  - Summer (DST): UTC-4 (EDT)
- ZIP Codes: 49402 (Branch); 49410 (Fountain); 49405 (Custer)
- Area code: 231
- FIPS code: 26-105-73060
- GNIS feature ID: 1627067
- Website: sheridantwpmason.org

Sheridan Township is a civil township of Mason County in the U.S. state of Michigan. As of the 2020 census, the township population was 1,044.

== History ==
Sheridan Township was established in 1889. It was named for Philip Sheridan, a Union Army general.

== Geography ==
The township is in eastern Mason County, bordered to the east by Lake County. According to the United States Census Bureau, the township has a total area of 35.93 square miles (93.06 km^{2}), of which 34.27 square miles (88.76 km^{2}) are land and 1.66 square miles (4.30 km^{2}), or 4.62%, are water. Round Lake is the largest of a cluster of more than seven lakes which cross the western side of the township. Tallman Lake is on the southern border of the township, crossing into Branch Township to the south.

== Demographics ==
As of the census of 2000, there were 969 people, 409 households, and 280 families residing in the township. The population density was 28.2 inhabitants per square mile (10.9/km^{2}). There were 1,013 housing units at an average density of 29.5 per square mile (11.4/km^{2}). The racial makeup of the township was 97.11% White, 0.21% African American, 0.52% Native American, 0.10% Asian, 0.52% from other races, and 1.55% from two or more races. Hispanic or Latino of any race were 1.44% of the population.

There were 409 households, out of which 20.0% had children under the age of 18 living with them, 57.7% were married couples living together, 6.8% had a female householder with no husband present, and 31.5% were non-families. 25.9% of all households were made up of individuals, and 9.3% had someone living alone who was 65 years of age or older. The average household size was 2.33 and the average family size was 2.80.

In the township the population was spread out, with 19.9% under the age of 18, 5.9% from 18 to 24, 25.6% from 25 to 44, 31.5% from 45 to 64, and 17.1% who were 65 years of age or older. The median age was 44 years. For every 100 females, there were 100.2 males. For every 100 females age 18 and over, there were 102.6 males.

The median income for a household in the township was $30,357, and the median income for a family was $35,000. Males had a median income of $34,167 versus $22,917 for females. The per capita income for the township was $17,679. About 10.2% of families and 15.3% of the population were below the poverty line, including 29.6% of those under age 18 and 8.2% of those age 65 or over.
