= Chase Township, Michigan =

- Civil township
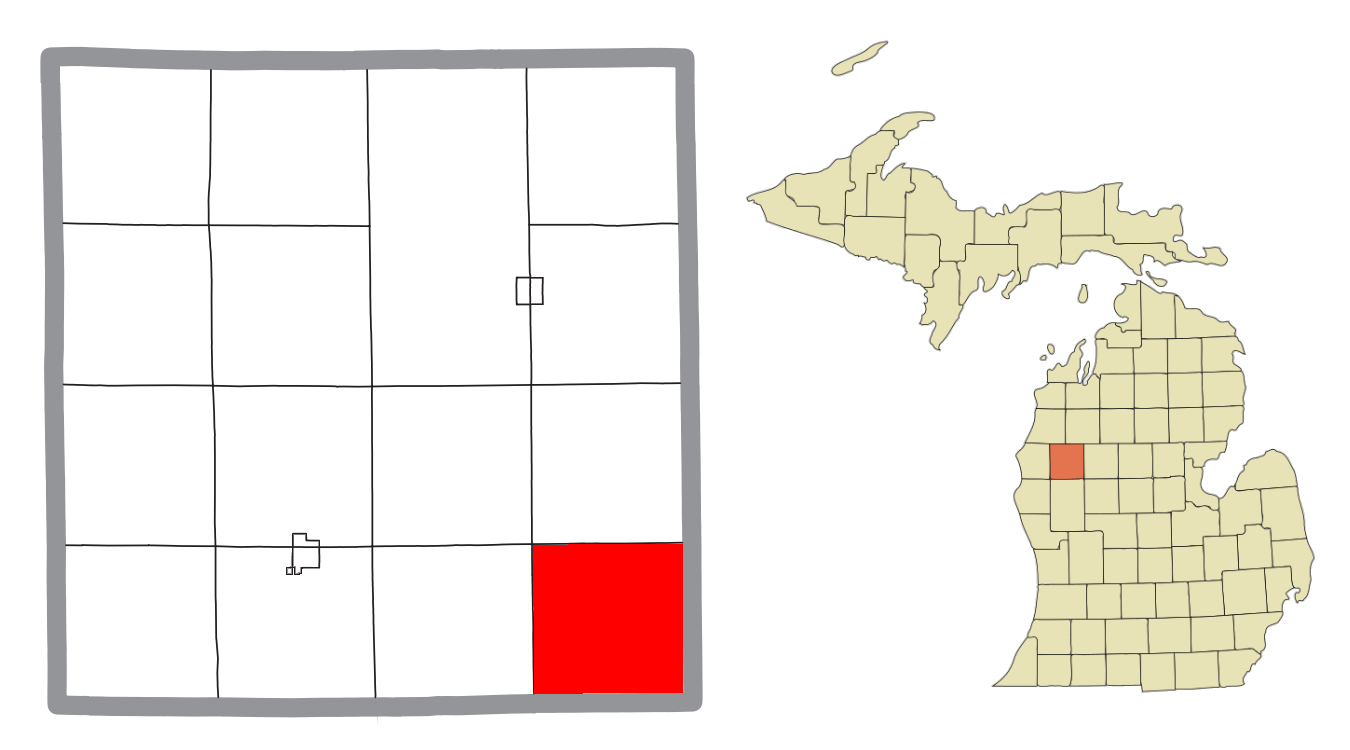
- Location within Lake County

- Location within the state of Michigan Location within the United States
- Coordinates: 43°52′30″N 85°37′14″W
- Country: United States
- State: Michigan
- County: Lake

Area
  - Total: 35.6 sq mi (92.1 km^{2})
  - Land: 35.4 sq mi (91.7 km^{2})
  - Water: 0.19 sq mi (0.5 km^{2})
- Elevation: 1,227 ft (374 m)

Population (2020)
  - Total: 1,153
  - Density: 32.6/sq mi (12.6/km^{2})
- Time zone: UTC-5 (Eastern (EST))
  - Summer (DST): UTC-4 (EDT)
- ZIP code(s): 49623
- Area code: 231
- FIPS code: 26-14880
- GNIS feature ID: 1626064
- Website: https://chasetownship.org/

Chase Township is a civil township of Lake County in the U.S. state of Michigan. The population was 1,153 at the 2020 census.

The unincorporated community of Chase is the only significant population center in the township. Chase is located where U.S. Highway 10 (US 10) crosses the Middle Branch of the Pere Marquette River at 43°53′21″N 85°38′08″W. The post office in Chase serves ZIP Code 49623, which includes most of the northwest part of Chase Township as well as the southwest portion of Pinora Township, the southeast portion of Cherry Valley Township, and the northeast portion of Yates Township.

Both the community and township were named after Salmon P. Chase, the Chief Justice of the United States at the time the area was being settled in the 1860s. The community was first known as "Greendale", which was recorded through clerical error as "Green Dale". A post office was established with the name of Chase in March 1872. It served as the county seat until 1874. The beginning of Chase as a community largely resulted from Charles Joiner building a sawmill, broom handle factory and shingle mill here in 1869.

== Geography ==
According to the United States Census Bureau, the township has a total area of 35.6 square miles (92 km^{2}), of which 35.4 square miles (92 km^{2}) is land and 0.2 square miles (0.52 km^{2}) (0.48%) is water.

== Demographics ==
As of the census of 2000, there were 1,194 people, 427 households, and 330 families residing in the township. The population density was 33.7 inhabitants per square mile (13.0/km^{2}). There were 559 housing units at an average density of 15.8 per square mile (6.1/km^{2}). The racial makeup of the township was 95.48% White, 1.68% African American, 0.08% Native American, 0.08% Pacific Islander, 0.34% from other races, and 2.35% from two or more races. Hispanic or Latino of any race were 1.17% of the population.

There were 427 households, out of which 38.6% had children under the age of 18 living with them, 64.4% were married couples living together, 8.7% had a female householder with no husband present, and 22.5% were non-families. 17.8% of all households were made up of individuals, and 6.1% had someone living alone who was 65 years of age or older. The average household size was 2.80 and the average family size was 3.16.

In the township the population was spread out, with 30.2% under the age of 18, 7.8% from 18 to 24, 29.9% from 25 to 44, 22.9% from 45 to 64, and 9.1% who were 65 years of age or older. The median age was 34 years. For every 100 females, there were 103.8 males. For every 100 females age 18 and over, there were 100.2 males.

The median income for a household in the township was $36,776, and the median income for a family was $39,375. Males had a median income of $29,821 versus $24,000 for females. The per capita income for the township was $14,882. About 11.8% of families and 12.9% of the population were below the poverty line, including 12.4% of those under age 18 and 20.5% of those age 65 or over.
