= Dover Township =

Dover Township may refer to:

== Canada ==
- Dover Township, Ontario

== United States ==
=== Arkansas ===
- Dover Township, Hot Spring County, Arkansas, in Hot Spring County, Arkansas
- Dover Township, Pope County, Arkansas

=== Iowa ===
- Dover Township, Fayette County, Iowa

=== Kansas ===
- Dover Township, Shawnee County, Kansas

=== Michigan ===
- Dover Township, Lake County, Michigan
- Dover Township, Lenawee County, Michigan
- Dover Township, Otsego County, Michigan

=== Minnesota ===
- Dover Township, Olmsted County, Minnesota

=== Missouri ===
- Dover Township, Lafayette County, Missouri

=== New Jersey ===
- Dover Township, New Jersey, now Toms River Township

=== Ohio ===
- Dover Township, Athens County, Ohio
- Dover Township, Cuyahoga County, Ohio, defunct
- Dover Township, Fulton County, Ohio
- Dover Township, Tuscarawas County, Ohio
- Dover Township, Union County, Ohio

=== Pennsylvania ===
- Dover Township, York County, Pennsylvania
