= Meade Township, Michigan =

Meade Township may refer to the following places in the U.S. state of Michigan:

- Meade Township, Huron County, Michigan
- Meade Township, Mason County, Michigan

== See also ==
- Meade, Macomb County, Michigan, a small unincorporated community in Macomb Township, Macomb County
