= 1906 Michigan gubernatorial election =

- November 6, 1906
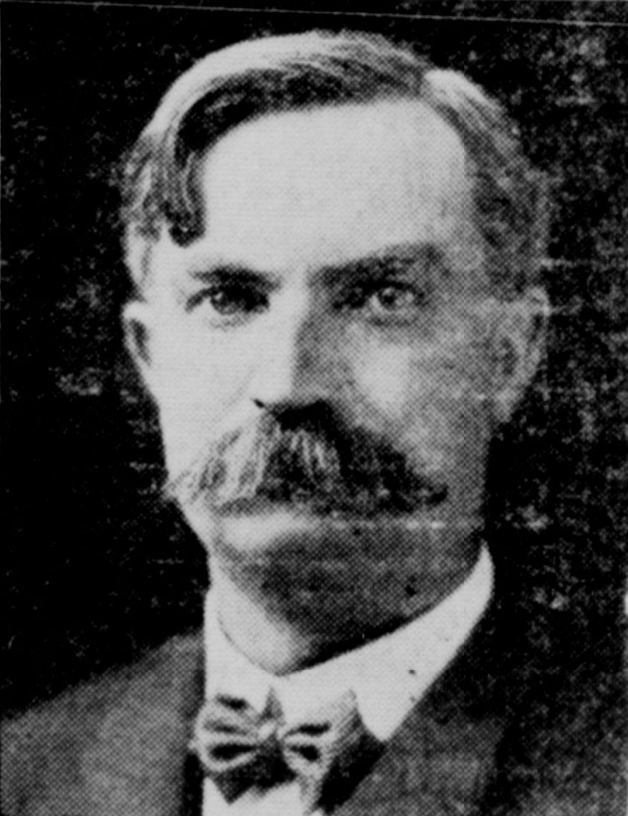

Nominee	Fred M. Warner	Charles H. Kimmerle
Party	Republican	Democratic
Popular vote	227,567	130,018
Percentage	60.88%	34.78%
- County results Warner: 40–50% 50–60% 60–70% 70–80% 80–90% >90% Kimmerle: 40–50%
Governor before election
Fred M. Warner
Republican
Elected Governor
Fred M. Warner
Republican

The 1906 Michigan gubernatorial election was held on November 6, 1906. Incumbent Republican Fred M. Warner defeated Democratic candidate Charles H. Kimmerle with 60.88% of the vote.

== General election ==
=== Candidates ===
Major party candidates

- Fred M. Warner, Republican
- Charles H. Kimmerle, Democratic

Other candidates

- R. Clark Reed, Prohibition
- James E. Walker, Socialist
- Herman Richter, Socialist Labor

=== Results ===
1906 Michigan gubernatorial election
Party	Candidate	Votes	%	±%
Republican	Fred M. Warner (inc.)	227,567	60.88%	+6.79%
Democratic	Charles H. Kimmerle	130,018	34.78%	−7.83%
Prohibition	R. Clark Reed	9,139	2.44%	+0.46%
Socialist	James E. Walker	5,925	1.59%	+0.41%
Socialist Labor	Herman Richter	1,153	0.31	+0.16%
	Scattering	4	0.00%	
Majority		97,549	26.10%	
Total votes		373,806	100.00%	
Republican hold		Swing	+14.62%	

==== Results by county ====
Cass County voted Democratic for the first time since 1884.

County	Fred M. Warner Republican		Charles H. Kimmerle Democratic		R. Clark Reed Prohibition		James E. Walker Socialist		Herman Richter Socialist Labor		Margin		Total votes cast
County	#	%	#	%	#	%	#	%	#	%	#	%	Total votes cast
Alcona	727	90.42%	58	7.21%	15	1.87%	4	0.50%	0	0.00%	669	83.21%	804
Alger	745	78.17%	176	18.47%	19	1.99%	13	1.36%	0	0.00%	569	59.71%	953
Allegan	2,489	70.69%	848	24.08%	118	3.35%	61	1.73%	5	0.14%	1,641	46.61%	3,521
Alpena	1,885	64.71%	930	31.93%	28	0.96%	64	2.20%	4	0.14%	955	32.78%	2,913 (Note: Includes 2 Scattering votes)
Antrim	1,370	75.90%	372	20.61%	48	2.66%	15	0.83%	0	0.00%	998	55.29%	1,805
Arenac	886	53.99%	666	40.59%	41	2.50%	47	2.86%	1	0.06%	220	13.41%	1,641
Baraga	544	72.73%	188	25.13%	11	1.47%	3	0.40%	2	0.27%	356	47.59%	748
Barry	2,324	54.68%	1,746	41.08%	163	3.84%	16	0.38%	1	0.02%	578	13.60%	4,250
Bay	4,712	62.85%	2,577	34.37%	86	1.15%	94	1.25%	28	0.37%	2,135	28.48%	7,497
Benzie	1,033	75.90%	188	13.81%	102	7.49%	23	1.69%	15	1.10%	845	62.09%	1,361
Berrien	5,143	55.68%	3,749	40.59%	159	1.72%	152	1.65%	33	0.36%	1,394	15.09%	9,236
Branch	2,514	69.35%	989	27.28%	66	1.82%	43	1.19%	13	0.36%	1,525	42.07%	3,625
Calhoun	4,378	57.43%	2,604	34.16%	191	2.51%	397	5.21%	53	0.70%	1,774	23.27%	7,623
Cass	2,322	47.83%	2,367	48.75%	97	2.00%	65	1.34%	4	0.08%	-45	-0.93%	4,855
Charlevoix	1,726	79.50%	296	13.63%	65	2.99%	46	2.12%	38	1.75%	1,430	65.87%	2,171
Cheboygan	1,795	60.62%	1,086	36.68%	34	1.15%	35	1.18%	11	0.37%	709	23.94%	2,961
Chippewa	2,204	72.19%	768	25.16%	52	1.70%	20	0.66%	9	0.29%	1,436	47.04%	3,053
Clare	875	65.45%	428	32.01%	26	1.94%	6	0.45%	2	0.15%	447	33.43%	1,337
Clinton	2,418	57.57%	1,661	39.55%	99	2.36%	21	0.50%	1	0.02%	757	18.02%	4,200
Crawford	471	64.34%	234	31.97%	13	1.78%	12	1.64%	2	0.27%	237	32.38%	732
Delta	1,743	81.91%	266	12.50%	34	1.60%	49	2.30%	36	1.69%	1,477	69.41%	2,128
Dickinson	1,937	85.82%	129	5.72%	108	4.79%	42	1.86%	41	1.82%	1,808	80.11%	2,257
Eaton	3,172	58.34%	2,069	38.05%	130	2.39%	66	1.21%	0	0.00%	1,103	20.29%	5,437
Emmet	1,416	64.04%	637	28.81%	142	6.42%	11	0.50%	5	0.23%	779	35.23%	2,211
Genesee	4,572	64.64%	2,029	28.69%	261	3.69%	198	2.80%	13	0.18%	2,543	35.95%	7,073
Gladwin	606	79.53%	132	17.32%	13	1.71%	11	1.44%	0	0.00%	474	62.20%	762
Gogebic	1,660	64.34%	720	27.91%	128	4.96%	44	1.71%	28	1.09%	940	36.43%	2,580
Grand Traverse	1,213	70.28%	399	23.12%	95	5.50%	14	0.81%	5	0.29%	814	47.16%	1,726
Gratiot	2,854	60.10%	1,742	36.68%	122	2.57%	28	0.59%	3	0.06%	1,112	23.42%	4,749
Hillsdale	2,210	65.40%	1,026	30.36%	119	3.52%	20	0.59%	4	0.12%	1,184	35.04%	3,379
Houghton	4,009	70.12%	957	16.74%	494	8.64%	217	3.80%	40	0.70%	3,052	53.38%	5,717
Huron	2,610	66.36%	1,191	30.28%	101	2.57%	26	0.66%	5	0.13%	1,419	36.08%	3,933
Ingham	5,151	54.69%	3,874	41.13%	312	3.31%	69	0.73%	13	0.14%	1,277	13.56%	9,419
Ionia	3,599	54.95%	2,505	38.24%	384	5.86%	57	0.87%	5	0.08%	1,094	16.70%	6,550
Iosco	844	65.58%	418	32.48%	15	1.17%	8	0.62%	2	0.16%	426	33.10%	1,287
Iron	446	83.83%	53	9.96%	24	4.51%	6	1.13%	3	0.56%	393	73.87%	532
Isabella	2,380	60.34%	1,478	37.47%	67	1.70%	15	0.38%	4	0.10%	902	22.87%	3,944
Jackson	5,474	54.53%	4,331	43.15%	191	1.90%	42	0.42%	0	0.00%	1,143	11.39%	10,038
Kalamazoo	4,624	51.18%	3,885	43.00%	229	2.53%	265	2.93%	32	0.35%	739	8.18%	9,035
Kalkaska	433	73.89%	109	18.60%	29	4.95%	13	2.22%	2	0.34%	324	55.29%	586
Kent	10,337	63.78%	4,426	27.31%	376	2.32%	991	6.11%	77	0.48%	5,911	36.47%	16,207
Keweenaw	455	92.48%	21	4.27%	4	0.81%	12	2.44%	0	0.00%	434	88.21%	492
Lake	369	81.28%	71	15.64%	9	1.98%	5	1.10%	0	0.00%	298	65.64%	454
Lapeer	2,800	64.23%	1,415	32.46%	109	2.50%	34	0.78%	1	0.02%	1,385	31.77%	4,359
Leelanau	712	73.86%	202	20.95%	45	4.67%	4	0.41%	1	0.10%	510	52.90%	964
Lenawee	4,957	57.41%	3,410	39.49%	211	2.44%	33	0.38%	24	0.28%	1,547	17.92%	8,635
Livingston	2,380	47.75%	2,227	44.68%	367	7.36%	9	0.18%	1	0.02%	153	3.07%	4,984
Luce	467	70.23%	169	25.41%	24	3.61%	3	0.45%	2	0.30%	298	44.81%	665
Mackinac	823	58.87%	553	39.56%	16	1.14%	4	0.29%	2	0.14%	270	19.31%	1,398
Macomb	3,804	54.96%	2,986	43.14%	107	1.55%	16	0.23%	8	0.12%	818	11.82%	6,922 (Note: Includes 1 Scattering vote)
Manistee	2,174	56.76%	1,546	40.37%	44	1.15%	55	1.44%	11	0.29%	628	16.40%	3,830
Marquette	3,814	77.33%	572	11.60%	188	3.81%	322	6.53%	36	0.73%	3,242	65.73%	4,932
Mason	1,389	56.30%	983	39.85%	75	3.04%	18	0.73%	2	0.08%	406	16.46%	2,467
Mecosta	1,381	69.64%	498	25.11%	52	2.62%	45	2.27%	7	0.35%	883	44.53%	1,983
Menominee	1,897	62.63%	1,006	33.21%	74	2.44%	43	1.42%	9	0.30%	891	29.42%	3,029
Midland	1,652	67.24%	744	30.28%	31	1.26%	25	1.02%	5	0.20%	908	36.96%	2,457
Missaukee	1,022	70.73%	382	26.44%	36	2.49%	4	0.28%	1	0.07%	640	44.29%	1,445
Monroe	3,217	49.62%	3,113	48.02%	127	1.96%	23	0.35%	3	0.05%	104	1.60%	6,483
Montcalm	3,280	71.13%	1,145	24.83%	117	2.54%	57	1.24%	12	0.26%	2,135	46.30%	4,611
Montmorency	444	76.95%	126	21.84%	4	0.69%	2	0.35%	1	0.17%	318	55.11%	577
Muskegon	3,491	64.76%	1,503	27.88%	46	0.85%	341	6.33%	10	0.19%	1,988	36.88%	5,391
Newaygo	1,175	72.35%	381	23.46%	46	2.83%	19	1.17%	3	0.18%	794	48.89%	1,624
Oakland	4,052	61.13%	2,356	35.54%	175	2.64%	32	0.48%	14	0.21%	1,696	25.58%	6,629
Oceana	1,579	63.85%	656	26.53%	203	8.21%	29	1.17%	6	0.24%	923	37.32%	2,473
Ogemaw	947	71.15%	325	24.42%	46	3.46%	8	0.60%	5	0.38%	622	46.73%	1,331
Ontonagon	1,095	67.89%	451	27.96%	20	1.24%	34	2.11%	13	0.81%	644	39.93%	1,613
Osceola	1,279	69.36%	492	26.68%	68	3.69%	5	0.27%	0	0.00%	787	42.68%	1,844
Oscoda	270	77.14%	77	22.00%	2	0.57%	1	0.29%	0	0.00%	193	55.14%	350
Otsego	443	76.25%	113	19.45%	17	2.93%	7	1.20%	1	0.17%	330	56.80%	581
Ottawa	3,195	68.34%	1,233	26.37%	111	2.37%	115	2.46%	21	0.45%	1,962	41.97%	4,675
Presque Isle	1,219	78.65%	311	20.06%	13	0.84%	4	0.26%	3	0.19%	908	58.58%	1,550
Roscommon	304	67.56%	131	29.11%	5	1.11%	10	2.22%	0	0.00%	173	38.44%	450
Saginaw	6,687	49.92%	6,107	45.59%	143	1.07%	393	2.93%	65	0.49%	580	4.33%	13,395
Sanilac	2,236	71.87%	716	23.02%	130	4.18%	18	0.58%	11	0.35%	1,520	48.86%	3,111
Schoolcraft	723	83.39%	116	13.38%	10	1.15%	10	1.15%	8	0.92%	607	70.01%	867
Shiawassee	3,914	60.64%	2,125	32.93%	339	5.25%	24	0.37%	52	0.81%	1,789	27.72%	6,454
St. Clair	5,581	56.81%	3,951	40.22%	154	1.57%	111	1.13%	27	0.27%	1,630	16.59%	9,824
St. Joseph	2,741	54.82%	2,102	42.04%	86	1.72%	62	1.24%	9	0.18%	639	12.78%	5,000
Tuscola	2,947	66.42%	1,194	26.91%	249	5.61%	40	0.90%	7	0.16%	1,753	39.51%	4,437
Van Buren	3,095	68.49%	1,280	28.32%	143	3.16%	1	0.02%	0	0.00%	1,815	40.16%	4,519
Washtenaw	5,220	57.13%	3,758	41.13%	110	1.20%	33	0.36%	16	0.18%	1,462	16.00%	9,137
Wayne	34,728	57.23%	24,767	40.82%	402	0.66%	573	0.94%	209	0.34%	9,961	16.42%	60,680
Wexford	1,758	74.87%	397	16.91%	174	7.41%	12	0.51%	7	0.30%	1,361	57.96%	2,348
Total	227,567	60.88%	130,018	34.78%	9,139	2.44%	5,925	1.59%	1,153	0.31%	97,549	26.10%	373,806

===== Counties that flipped from Democratic to Republican =====
- Ingham
- Ionia
- Jackson
- Kent
- Livingston
- Monroe
- Washtenaw
- Wayne

===== Counties that flipped from Republican to Democratic =====
- Cass
