= Logan Township, Mason County, Michigan =

Logan Township, Michigan
- Civil township
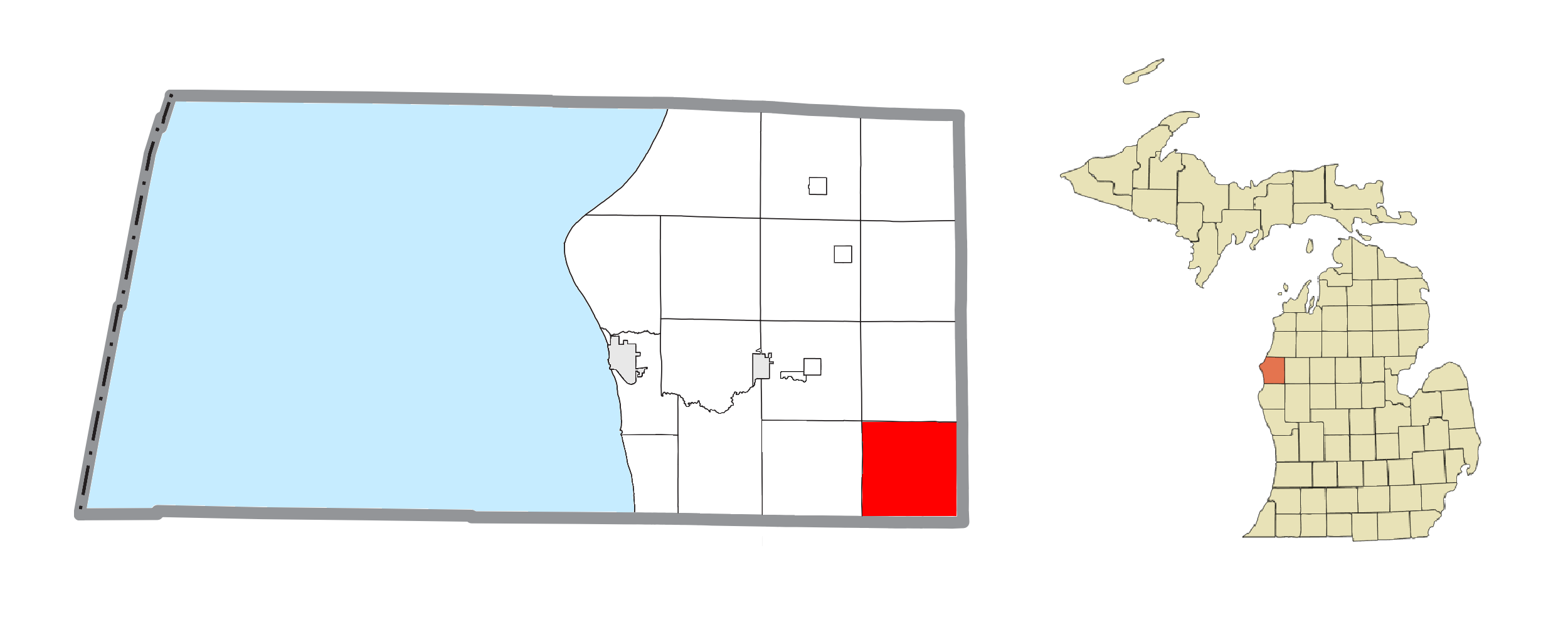
- Location within Mason County

- Location within Michigan Location within the United States
- Coordinates: 43°51′28″N 86°07′05″W
- Country: United States
- State: Michigan
- County: Mason

Government
  - Supervisor: Bruce Burke
  - Clerk: John Kampfschulte

Area
  - Total: 36.14 sq mi (93.6 km^{2})
  - Land: 36.06 sq mi (93.4 km^{2})
  - Water: 0.08 sq mi (0.21 km^{2})
- Elevation: 820 ft (250 m)

Population (2020)
  - Total: 329
  - Density: 9.12/sq mi (3.52/km^{2})
- Time zone: UTC-5 (Eastern (EST))
  - Summer (DST): UTC-4 (EDT)
- ZIP Codes: 49402 (Branch); 49405 (Custer)
- Area code: 231
- FIPS code: 26-105-49140
- GNIS feature ID: 1626637

Logan Township is a civil township of Mason County in the U.S. state of Michigan. The population was 329 at the 2020 census.

Logan Township was named in honor of John A. Logan, a candidate in the 1884 United States presidential election.

== Geography ==
The township is in the southeast corner of Mason County, bordered by Lake County to the east, Oceana County to the south, and Newaygo County at the township's southeast corner. According to the United States Census Bureau, the township has a total area of 36.14 square miles (93.60 km^{2}), of which 36.06 square miles (93.39 km^{2}) are land and 0.08 square miles (0.21 km^{2}), or 0.22%, are water. The Big South Branch of the Pere Marquette River flows across the township from southeast to northwest.

== Demographics ==
As of the census of 2000, there were 329 people, 149 households, and 109 families residing in the township. The population density was 9.2 inhabitants per square mile (3.6/km^{2}). There were 388 housing units at an average density of 10.8 per square mile (4.2/km^{2}). The racial makeup of the township was 98.48% White, 0.61% Asian, 0.30% from other races, and 0.61% from two or more races. Hispanic or Latino of any race were 1.52% of the population.

There were 149 households, out of which 16.1% had children under the age of 18 living with them, 67.1% were married couples living together, 3.4% had a female householder with no husband present, and 26.2% were non-families. 22.1% of all households were made up of individuals, and 5.4% had someone living alone who was 65 years of age or older. The average household size was 2.21 and the average family size was 2.55.

In the township the population was spread out, with 16.4% under the age of 18, 3.3% from 18 to 24, 19.8% from 25 to 44, 39.2% from 45 to 64, and 21.3% who were 65 years of age or older. The median age was 53 years. For every 100 females, there were 110.9 males. For every 100 females age 18 and over, there were 111.5 males.

The median income for a household in the township was $30,341, and the median income for a family was $34,643. Males had a median income of $31,667 versus $23,750 for females. The per capita income for the township was $16,762. About 8.8% of families and 14.2% of the population were below the poverty line, including 16.0% of those under age 18 and 21.1% of those age 65 or over.
