= Dover, Michigan =

Dover may refer to the following places in the U.S. state of Michigan:

- Dover, Cass County, Michigan, a former post office in Milton Township
- Dover, Clare County, Michigan, an unincorporated community in Grant Township
- Dover, Lenawee County, Michigan, a former post office in Dover Township
- Dover, Washtenaw County, Michigan, an unincorporated community in Dexter Township

== See also ==
- Mount Morris, Michigan, initially platted in 1862 with the name Dover
- Dover Township, Lake County, Michigan
- Dover Township, Lenawee County, Michigan
- Dover Township, Otsego County, Michigan
