= Webber Township, Michigan =

- Civil township
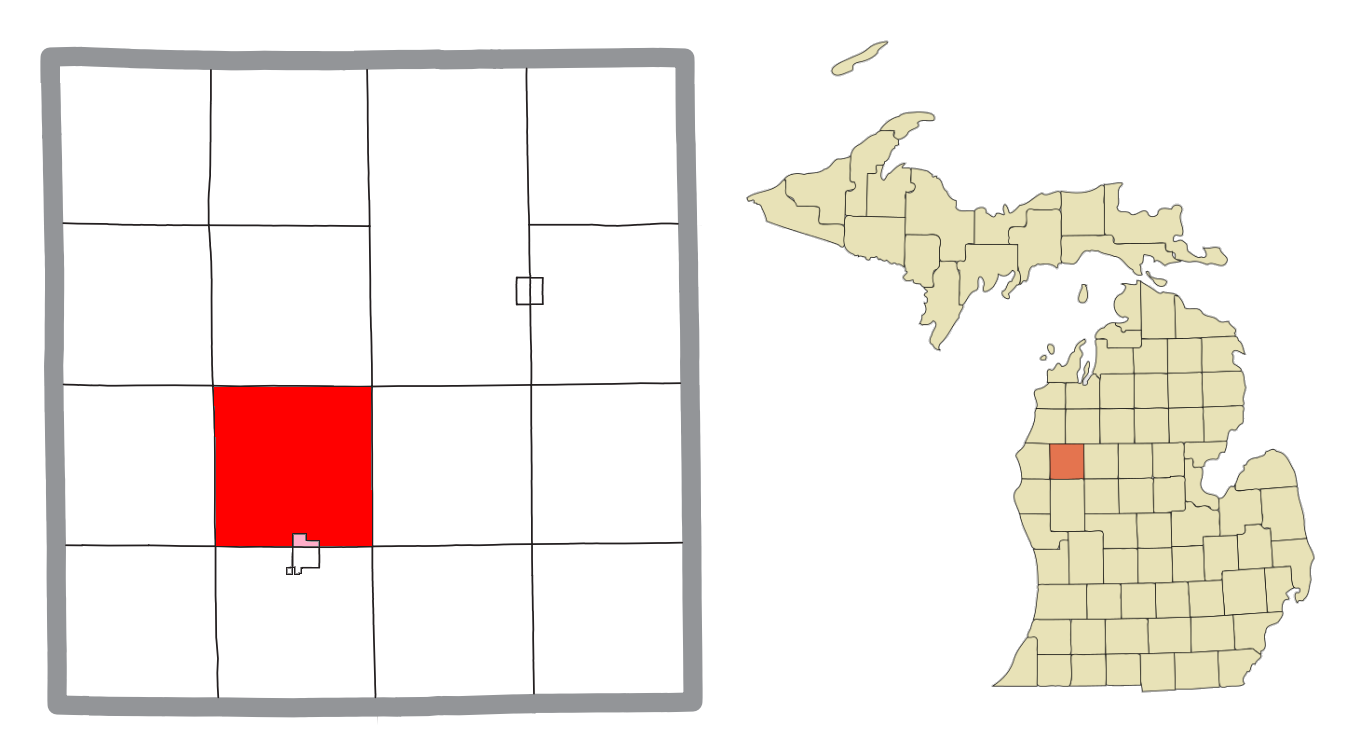
- Location within Lake County (red) and an administered portion of the Baldwin village (pink)

- Location within the state of Michigan Location within the United States
- Coordinates: 43°55′42″N 85°51′18″W
- Country: United States
- State: Michigan
- County: Lake

Area
  - Total: 35.4 sq mi (91.8 km^{2})
  - Land: 34.9 sq mi (90.3 km^{2})
  - Water: 0.58 sq mi (1.5 km^{2})
- Elevation: 909 ft (277 m)

Population (2020)
  - Total: 2,384
  - Density: 68.4/sq mi (26.4/km^{2})
- Time zone: UTC-5 (Eastern (EST))
  - Summer (DST): UTC-4 (EDT)
- FIPS code: 26-85060
- GNIS feature ID: 1627236
- Website: https://webbertownship.com/

Webber Township is a civil township of Lake County in the U.S. state of Michigan. The population was 2,384 at the 2020 census. It was named for William L. Webber, land commissioner and general counsel for the Flint and Pere Marquette Railroad.

== Geography ==
According to the United States Census Bureau, the township has a total area of 35.5 square miles (92 km^{2}), of which 34.9 square miles (90 km^{2}) is land and 0.6 square miles (1.6 km^{2}) (1.58%) is water.

== Communities ==
- Baldwin is a village located in the southern portion of the township. It is the county seat of Lake County.
- Wolf Lake is a census designated place (CDP) located mostly in Peacock Township while also extending into Webber Township. The community is also along the 44th parallel.

== Demographics ==
As of the census of 2000, there were 1,875 people, 638 households, and 338 families residing in the township. The population density was 53.8 inhabitants per square mile (20.8/km^{2}). There were 1,365 housing units at an average density of 39.1 per square mile (15.1/km^{2}). The racial makeup of the township was 63.36% White, 29.55% African American, 1.92% Native American, 0.21% Asian, 1.07% from other races, and 3.89% from two or more races. Hispanic or Latino of any race were 3.63% of the population.

There were 638 households, out of which 19.7% had children under the age of 18 living with them, 39.7% were married couples living together, 11.0% had a female householder with no husband present, and 46.9% were non-families. 40.6% of all households were made up of individuals, and 19.3% had someone living alone who was 65 years of age or older. The average household size was 2.05 and the average family size was 2.77.

In the township the population was spread out, with 20.5% under the age of 18, 18.8% from 18 to 24, 20.9% from 25 to 44, 20.3% from 45 to 64, and 19.5% who were 65 years of age or older. The median age was 37 years. For every 100 females, there were 158.3 males. For every 100 females age 18 and over, there were 143.5 males.

The median income for a household in the township was $20,822, and the median income for a family was $24,352. Males had a median income of $26,042 versus $19,191 for females. The per capita income for the township was $9,512. About 23.2% of families and 28.1% of the population were below the poverty line, including 41.5% of those under age 18 and 14.7% of those age 65 or over.
