= Branch Township, Michigan =

- Civil township
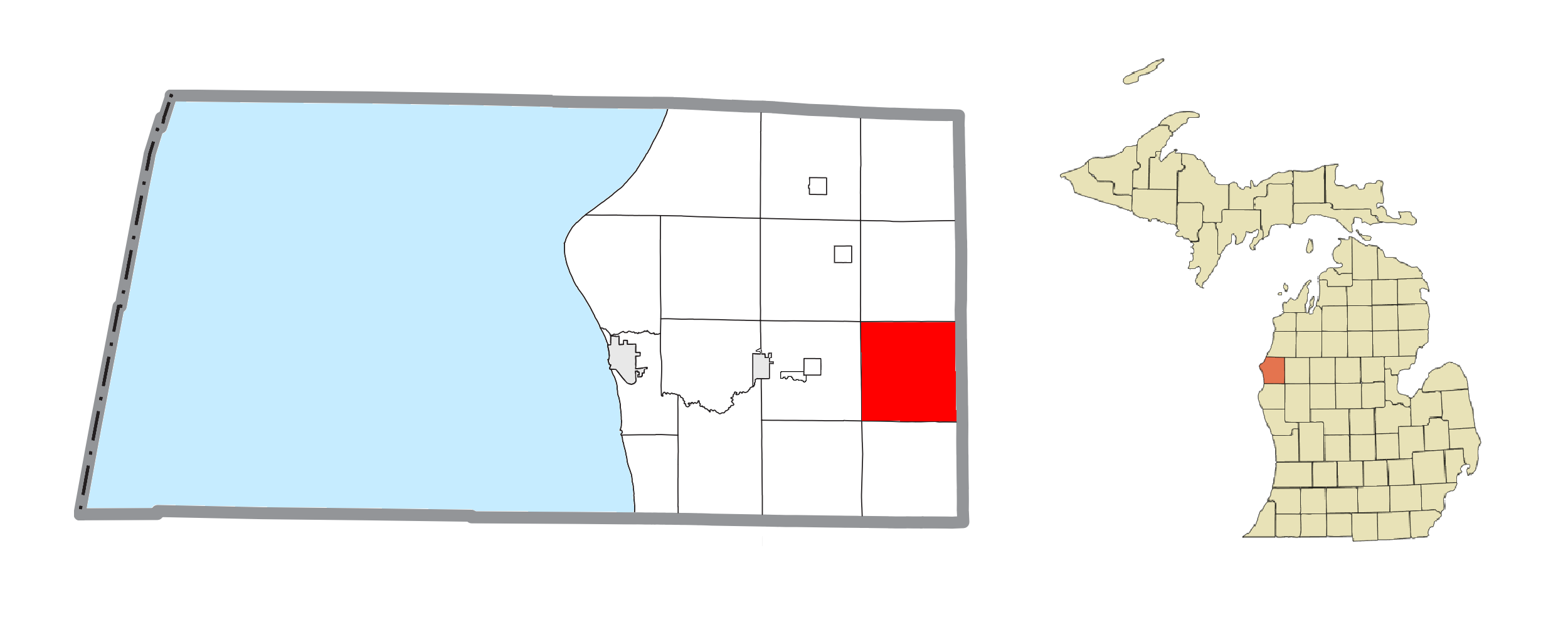
- Location within Mason County

- Location within Michigan Location within the United States
- Coordinates: 43°57′02″N 86°06′06″W
- Country: United States
- State: Michigan
- County: Mason

Government
  - Supervisor: Michael Shoup
  - Clerk: Kimberly Tenney

Area
  - Total: 35.98 sq mi (93.2 km^{2})
  - Land: 35.40 sq mi (91.7 km^{2})
  - Water: 0.58 sq mi (1.5 km^{2})
- Elevation: 725 ft (221 m)

Population (2020)
  - Total: 1,405
  - Density: 39.7/sq mi (15.3/km^{2})
- Time zone: UTC-5 (Eastern (EST))
  - Summer (DST): UTC-4 (EDT)
- ZIP Codes: 49402 (Branch); 49405 (Custer); 49410 (Fountain); 49458 (Walhalla)
- Area code: 231
- FIPS code: 26-105-10020
- GNIS feature ID: 1625970

Branch Township is a civil township of Mason County in the U.S. state of Michigan. As of the 2020 census, the township population was 1,405. Branch Township was named after Branch County, Michigan.

== Communities ==
- Branch is an unincorporated community on US 10 on the boundary between Mason and Lake counties. The Branch ZIP code 49402 serves the eastern part of Branch Township.
- Tallman is an unincorporated community in the north of the township. The community was established in 1879 Horace and Marshall F. Butters. A post office in the community was in operation from 1880 to 1887, from 1888 to 1891, and from 1897 to 1953.
- Walhalla is a small unincorporated community located on US 10 at 43°57′13″N 86°06′53″W between Baldwin and Ludington. Walhalla is slightly more than one mile north of the Pere Marquette River. Walhalla was the home office to the Michigan Womyn's Music Festival.

== Geography ==
The township is in eastern Mason County and is bordered to the east by Lake County. Ludington, the county seat, is 17 miles (27 km) to the west by US 10.

According to the U.S. Census Bureau, Branch Township has a total area of 35.98 square miles (93.2 km^{2}), of which 35.40 square miles (91.69 km^{2}) are land and 0.58 square miles (1.50 km^{2}), or 1.61%, are water. The Pere Marquette River, a tributary of Lake Michigan, flows east to west across the south-central part of the township.

== Demographics ==
As of the census of 2000, there were 1,181 people, 506 households, and 332 families residing in the township. The population density was 33.3 inhabitants per square mile (12.9/km^{2}). There were 921 housing units at an average density of 26.0 per square mile (10.0/km^{2}). The racial makeup of the township was 97.88% White, 0.34% African American, 0.68% Native American, 0.25% Asian, 0.25% from other races, and 0.59% from two or more races. Hispanic or Latino of any race were 2.37% of the population.

There were 506 households, out of which 25.7% had children under the age of 18 living with them, 54.0% were married couples living together, 8.7% had a female householder with no husband present, and 34.2% were non-families. 27.3% of all households were made up of individuals, and 9.9% had someone living alone who was 65 years of age or older. The average household size was 2.33 and the average family size was 2.79.

In the township the population was spread out, with 21.4% under the age of 18, 6.4% from 18 to 24, 27.9% from 25 to 44, 28.7% from 45 to 64, and 15.5% who were 65 years of age or older. The median age was 41 years. For every 100 females, there were 99.5 males. For every 100 females age 18 and over, there were 95.8 males.

The median income for a household in the township was $27,593, and the median income for a family was $32,500. Males had a median income of $27,159 versus $20,921 for females. The per capita income for the township was $15,659. About 6.8% of families and 9.9% of the population were below the poverty line, including 17.1% of those under age 18 and 6.3% of those age 65 or over.
