= Elk Township, Lake County, Michigan =

Elk Township, Michigan
- Civil township
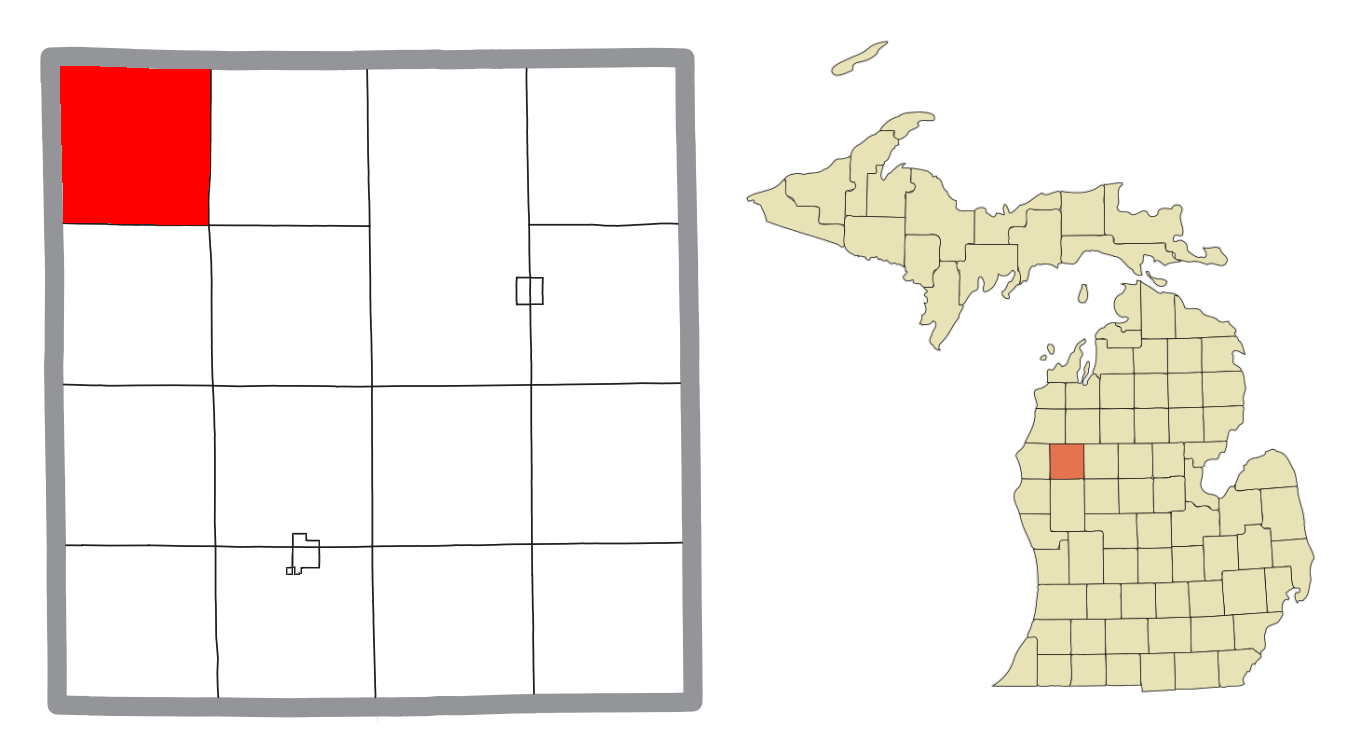
- Location within Lake County

- Location within the state of Michigan Location within the United States
- Coordinates: 44°07′30″N 85°58′34″W
- Country: United States
- State: Michigan
- County: Lake

Area
  - Total: 36.8 sq mi (95.3 km^{2})
  - Land: 35.6 sq mi (92.2 km^{2})
  - Water: 1.2 sq mi (3.2 km^{2})
- Elevation: 761 ft (232 m)

Population (2020)
  - Total: 940
  - Density: 26/sq mi (10/km^{2})
- Time zone: UTC-5 (Eastern (EST))
  - Summer (DST): UTC-4 (EDT)
- FIPS code: 26-25260
- GNIS feature ID: 1626224
- Website: https://www.elk-township.org/

Elk Township is a civil township of Lake County in the U.S. state of Michigan. As of the 2020 census, the township population was 940.

== Geography ==
According to the United States Census Bureau, the township has a total area of 36.8 square miles (95 km^{2}), of which 35.6 square miles (92 km^{2}) is land and 1.2 square miles (3.1 km^{2}) (3.34%) is water.

== Demographics ==
As of the census of 2000, there were 900 people, 420 households, and 275 families residing in the township. The population density was 25.3 inhabitants per square mile (9.8/km^{2}). There were 1,376 housing units at an average density of 38.7 units per square mile (14.9 units/km^{2}). The racial makeup of the township was 97.56% White, 0.11% African American, 0.78% Native American, 0.22% Asian, 0.11% Pacific Islander, 0.33% from other races, and 0.89% from two or more races. Hispanic or Latino of any race were 0.56% of the population.

There were 420 households, out of which 17.4% had children under the age of 18 living with them, 57.6% were married couples living together, 4.8% had a female householder with no husband present, and 34.5% were non-families. 30.5% of all households were made up of individuals, and 12.9% had someone living alone who was 65 years of age or older. The average household size was 2.14 and the average family size was 2.61.

In the township the population was spread out, with 17.1% under the age of 18, 4.9% from 18 to 24, 20.2% from 25 to 44, 34.7% from 45 to 64, and 23.1% who were 65 years of age or older. The median age was 51 years. For every 100 females, there were 104.5 males. For every 100 females age 18 and over, there were 101.1 males.

The median income for a household in the township was $31,917, and the median income for a family was $38,523. Males had a median income of $32,188 versus $25,104 for females. The per capita income for the township was $16,293. About 7.8% of families and 12.1% of the population were below the poverty line, including 15.4% of those under age 18 and 8.8% of those age 65 or over.
