= Cherry Valley Township, Michigan =

- Civil township
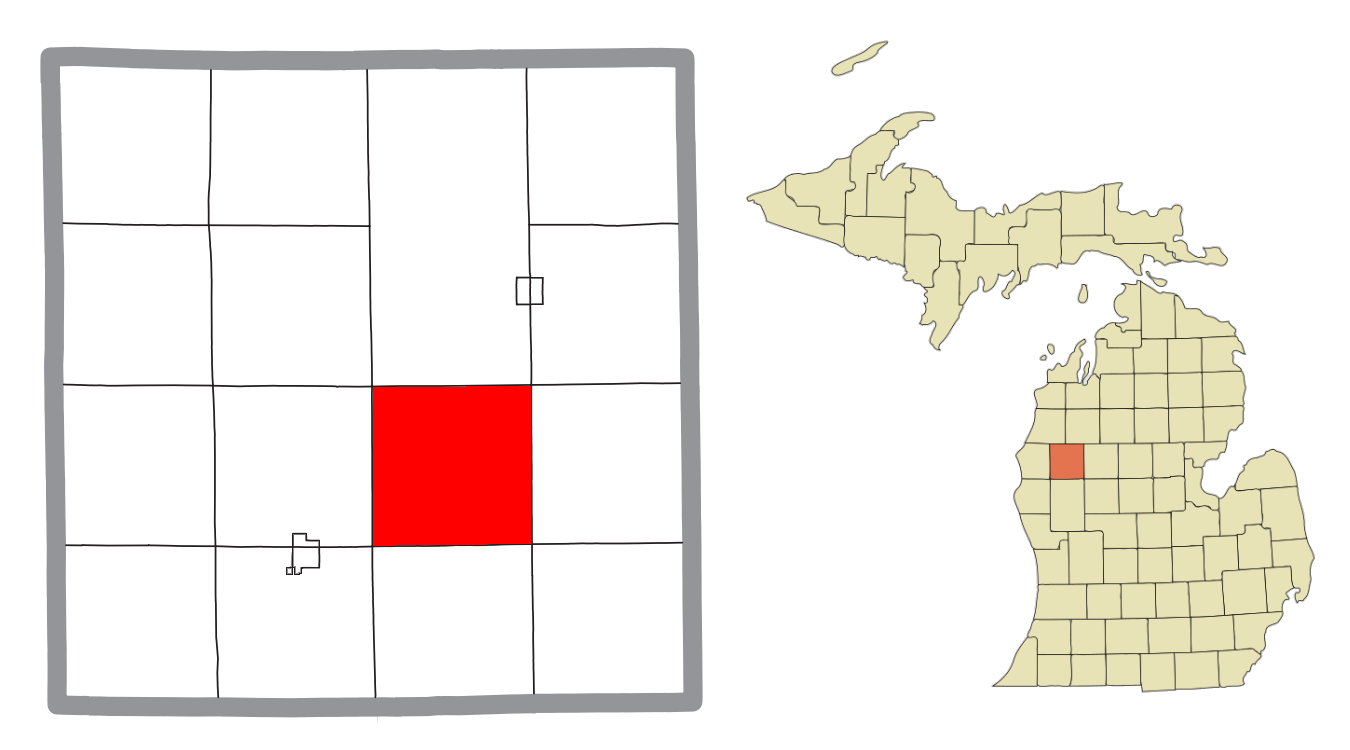
- Location within Lake County

- Location within the state of Michigan Location within the United States
- Coordinates: 43°55′09″N 85°45′08″W
- Country: United States
- State: Michigan
- County: Lake

Area
  - Total: 35.6 sq mi (92.2 km^{2})
  - Land: 35.6 sq mi (92.2 km^{2})
  - Water: 0 sq mi (0.0 km^{2})
- Elevation: 866 ft (264 m)

Population (2020)
  - Total: 422
  - Density: 11.9/sq mi (4.58/km^{2})
- Time zone: UTC-5 (Eastern (EST))
  - Summer (DST): UTC-4 (EDT)
- FIPS code: 26-15100
- GNIS feature ID: 1626068
- Website: https://cherryvalleytwsp.org/

Cherry Valley Township is a civil township of Lake County in the U.S. state of Michigan. The population was 422 at the 2020 census.

== Geography ==
According to the United States Census Bureau, the township has a total area of 35.6 square miles (92 km^{2}), all land.

== Demographics ==
As of the census of 2000, there were 368 people, 160 households, and 119 families residing in the township. The population density was 10.3 inhabitants per square mile (4.0/km^{2}). There were 435 housing units at an average density of 12.2 per square mile (4.7/km^{2}). The racial makeup of the township was 88.59% White, 6.52% African American, 2.17% Native American, 1.09% from other races, and 1.63% from two or more races. Hispanic or Latino of any race were 1.90% of the population.

There were 160 households, out of which 23.8% had children under the age of 18 living with them, 60.0% were married couples living together, 8.1% had a female householder with no husband present, and 25.6% were non-families. 22.5% of all households were made up of individuals, and 13.8% had someone living alone who was 65 years of age or older. The average household size was 2.30 and the average family size was 2.61.

In the township the population was spread out, with 18.2% under the age of 18, 6.8% from 18 to 24, 20.7% from 25 to 44, 32.1% from 45 to 64, and 22.3% who were 65 years of age or older. The median age was 48 years. For every 100 females, there were 111.5 males. For every 100 females age 18 and over, there were 112.0 males.

The median income for a household in the township was $31,250, and the median income for a family was $34,286. Males had a median income of $27,000 versus $24,063 for females. The per capita income for the township was $15,030. About 15.6% of families and 19.9% of the population were below the poverty line, including 29.4% of those under age 18 and 14.4% of those age 65 or over.
