= Lake Township, Lake County, Michigan =

Lake Township, Michigan
- Civil township
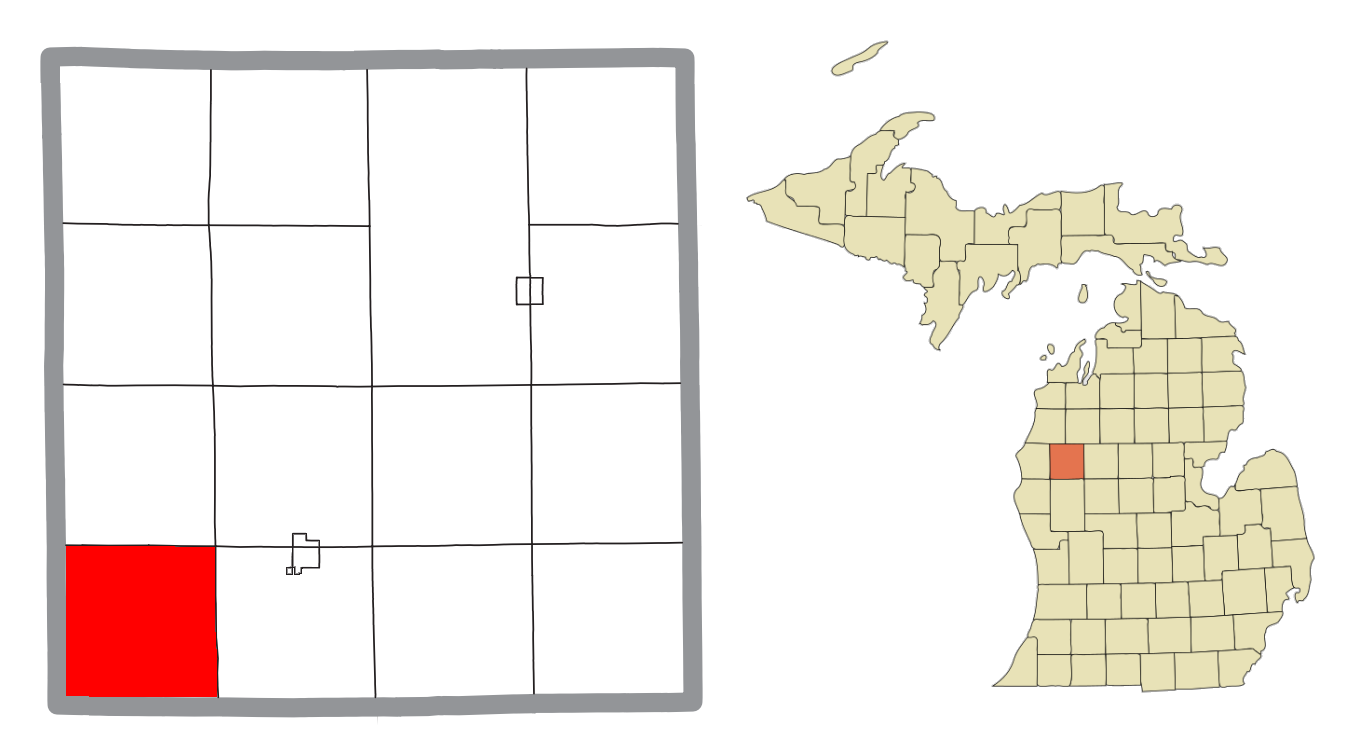
- Location within Lake County

- Location within the state of Michigan Location within the United States
- Coordinates: 43°50′46″N 85°58′03″W
- Country: United States
- State: Michigan
- County: Lake

Area
  - Total: 36.0 sq mi (93.2 km^{2})
  - Land: 34.1 sq mi (88.2 km^{2})
  - Water: 1.9 sq mi (4.9 km^{2})
- Elevation: 820 ft (250 m)

Population (2020)
  - Total: 810
  - Density: 24/sq mi (9.2/km^{2})
- Time zone: UTC-5 (Eastern (EST))
  - Summer (DST): UTC-4 (EDT)
- FIPS code: 26-44320
- GNIS feature ID: 1626574
- Website: https://laketownshiplcmi.gov/

Lake Township is a civil township of Lake County in the U.S. state of Michigan. The population was 810 at the 2020 census.

== Geography ==
According to the United States Census Bureau, the township has a total area of 36.0 square miles (93 km^{2}), of which 34.1 square miles (88 km^{2}) is land and 1.9 square miles (4.9 km^{2}) (5.31%) is water.

== Demographics ==
As of the census of 2000, there were 849 people, 412 households, and 276 families residing in the township. The population density was 24.9 inhabitants per square mile (9.6/km^{2}). There were 2,190 housing units at an average density of 64.3 per square mile (24.8/km^{2}). The racial makeup of the township was 92.82% White, 4.83% African American, 1.06% Native American, and 1.30% from two or more races. Hispanic or Latino of any race were 0.12% of the population.

There were 412 households, out of which 13.6% had children under the age of 18 living with them, 60.4% were married couples living together, 3.9% had a female householder with no husband present, and 33.0% were non-families. 27.7% of all households were made up of individuals, and 14.6% had someone living alone who was 65 years of age or older. The average household size was 2.06 and the average family size was 2.44.

In the township the population was spread out, with 12.7% under the age of 18, 3.7% from 18 to 24, 17.6% from 25 to 44, 37.1% from 45 to 64, and 29.0% who were 65 years of age or older. The median age was 55 years. For every 100 females, there were 102.6 males. For every 100 females age 18 and over, there were 101.4 males.

The median income for a household in the township was $26,806, and the median income for a family was $30,179. Males had a median income of $30,167 versus $17,337 for females. The per capita income for the township was $19,053. About 11.2% of families and 16.0% of the population were below the poverty line, including 43.3% of those under age 18 and 6.3% of those age 65 or over.
