= Meade Township, Mason County, Michigan =

Meade Township, Michigan
- Civil township
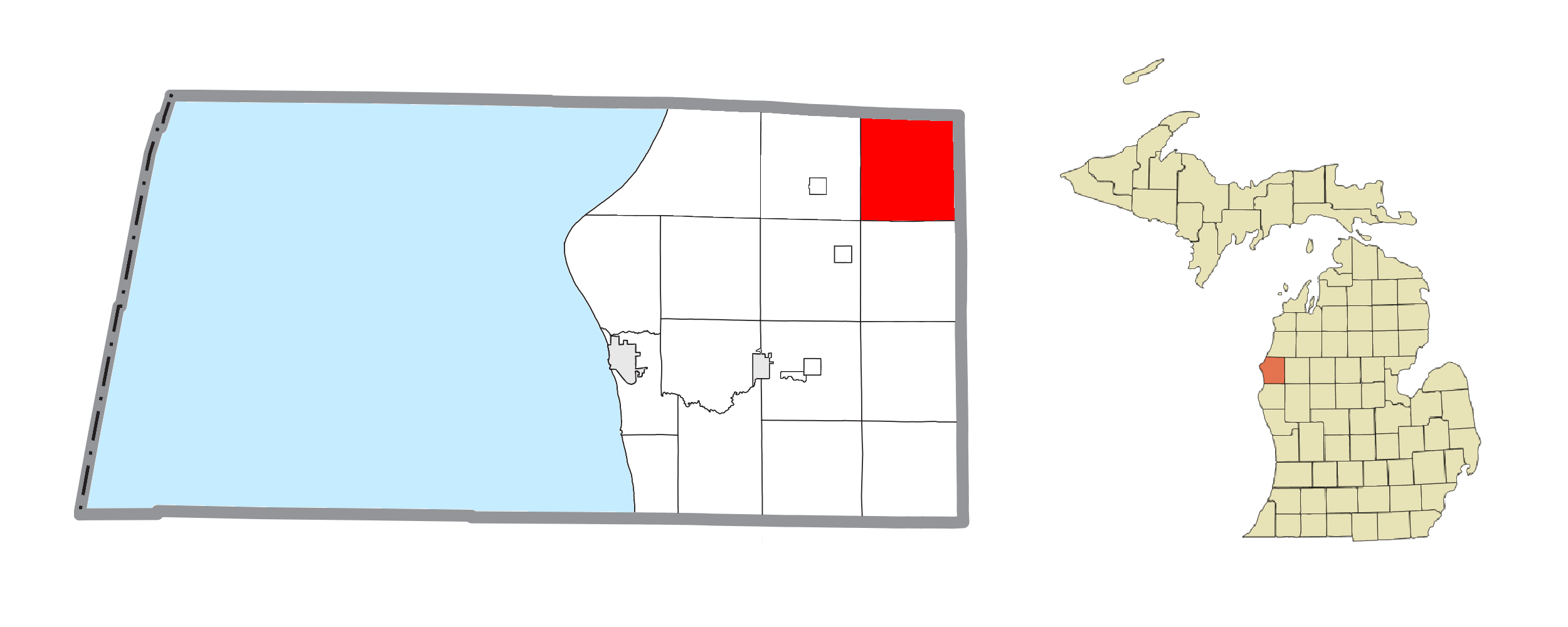
- Location within Mason County

- Location within Michigan Location within the United States
- Coordinates: 44°08′29″N 86°05′40″W
- Country: United States
- State: Michigan
- County: Mason
- Established: 1910

Government
  - Supervisor: Lois Krepps
  - Clerk: Susan Hasenbank

Area
  - Total: 37.50 sq mi (97.1 km^{2})
  - Land: 37.41 sq mi (96.9 km^{2})
  - Water: 0.09 sq mi (0.23 km^{2})
- Elevation: 702 ft (214 m)

Population (2020)
  - Total: 179
  - Density: 4.78/sq mi (1.85/km^{2})
- Time zone: UTC-5 (Eastern (EST))
  - Summer (DST): UTC-4 (EDT)
- ZIP Codes: 49411 (Free Soil); 49644 (Irons); 49660 (Manistee)
- Area code: 231
- FIPS code: 26-105-52640
- GNIS feature ID: 1626715

Meade Township is a civil township of Mason County in the U.S. state of Michigan. The population was 179 at the 2020 census.

== History ==
Meade Township was established in 1910. It was named for George Meade, a Union Army general.

== Geography ==
Meade Township is in the northeast corner of Mason County, bordered to the north by Manistee County and to the east by Lake County. According to the U.S. Census Bureau, the township has a total area of 37.50 square miles (97.12 km^{2}), of which 37.41 square miles (96.89 km^{2}) are land and 0.09 square miles (0.23 km^{2}), or 0.23%, are water. The Big Sable River flows northwesterly across the southwest part of the township, and the Little Manistee River crosses the northeast corner of the township.

== Demographics ==
As of the census of 2000, there were 287 people, 70 households, and 52 families residing in the township. The population density was 7.6 inhabitants per square mile (2.9/km^{2}). There were 228 housing units at an average density of 6.1 per square mile (2.4/km^{2}). The racial makeup of the township was 71.08% White, 22.30% African American, 2.09% Native American, 1.05% Asian, 0.35% Pacific Islander, 0.35% from other races, and 2.79% from two or more races. Hispanic or Latino of any race were 2.44% of the population.

There were 70 households, out of which 17.1% had children under the age of 18 living with them, 65.7% were married couples living together, 4.3% had a female householder with no husband present, and 25.7% were non-families. 20.0% of all households were made up of individuals, and 10.0% had someone living alone who was 65 years of age or older. The average household size was 2.26 and the average family size was 2.54.

In the township the population was spread out, with 8.0% under the age of 18, 9.4% from 18 to 24, 45.3% from 25 to 44, 26.1% from 45 to 64, and 11.1% who were 65 years of age or older. The median age was 39 years. For every 100 females, there were 298.6 males. For every 100 females age 18 and over, there were 319.0 males.

The median income for a household in the township was $50,536, and the median income for a family was $54,250. Males had a median income of $26,000 versus $26,875 for females. The per capita income for the township was $14,334. About 2.1% of families and 8.4% of the population were below the poverty line, including none of those under the age of eighteen and 20.0% of those 65 or over.
