= Dover Township, Lafayette County, Missouri =

Inactive township in the U.S. state of Missouri

Coordinates: 39.1594°N 93.6636°W

Dover Township is an inactive township in Lafayette County, in the U.S. state of Missouri.

Dover Township was established in 1836, and most likely took its name from a local church of the same name.
