= Pinora Township, Michigan =

- Civil township
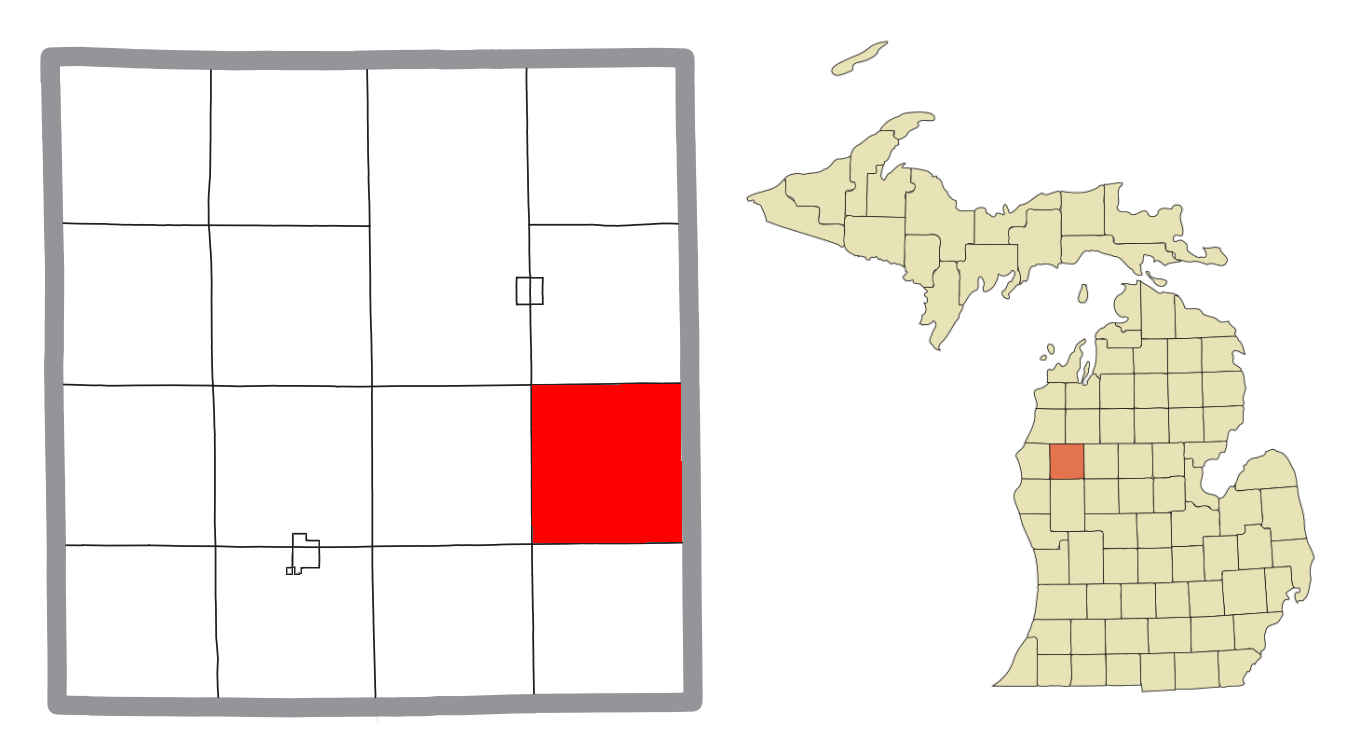
- Location within Lake County

- Location within the state of Michigan Location within the United States
- Coordinates: 43°57′22″N 85°38′29″W
- Country: United States
- State: Michigan
- County: Lake

Area
  - Total: 35.6 sq mi (92.1 km^{2})
  - Land: 35.5 sq mi (92.0 km^{2})
  - Water: 0.039 sq mi (0.1 km^{2})
- Elevation: 1,211 ft (369 m)

Population (2020)
  - Total: 757
  - Density: 21.3/sq mi (8.23/km^{2})
- Time zone: UTC-5 (Eastern (EST))
  - Summer (DST): UTC-4 (EDT)
- FIPS code: 26-64440
- GNIS feature ID: 1626906
- Website: https://pinoratownshipmi.org/

Pinora Township is a civil township of Lake County in the U.S. state of Michigan. The population was 757 at the 2020 census.

== Geography ==
According to the United States Census Bureau, the township has a total area of 35.6 square miles (92 km^{2}), of which 35.5 square miles (92 km^{2}) is land and 0.1 square miles (0.26 km^{2}) (0.14%) is water.

== Communities ==
- Deer Lake was a lumbering community in this township. It also was a station on the Grand Rapids & Indiana Railroad. It had a post office from 1881 until 1893.

== Demographics ==
As of the census of 2000, there were 643 people, 253 households, and 180 families residing in the township. The population density was 18.1 per square mile (7.0/km^{2}). There were 416 housing units at an average density of 11.7 per square mile (4.5/km^{2}). The racial makeup of the township was 97.51% White, 0.16% African American, 0.31% Native American, 0.16% Asian, 0.16% Pacific Islander, and 1.71% from two or more races. Hispanic or Latino of any race were 0.47% of the population.

There were 253 households, out of which 30.4% had children under the age of 18 living with them, 58.9% were married couples living together, 7.1% had a female householder with no husband present, and 28.5% were non-families. 21.3% of all households were made up of individuals, and 9.1% had someone living alone who was 65 years of age or older. The average household size was 2.54 and the average family size was 2.93.

In the township the population was spread out, with 23.3% under the age of 18, 7.3% from 18 to 24, 25.0% from 25 to 44, 29.7% from 45 to 64, and 14.6% who were 65 years of age or older. The median age was 40 years. For every 100 females, there were 104.8 males. For every 100 females age 18 and over, there were 107.1 males.

The median income for a household in the township was $37,222, and the median income for a family was $44,375. Males had a median income of $32,083 versus $22,981 for females. The per capita income for the township was $17,285. About 5.2% of families and 9.8% of the population were below the poverty line, including 8.0% of those under age 18 and 10.0% of those age 65 or over.
