= Peacock Township, Michigan =

- Civil township
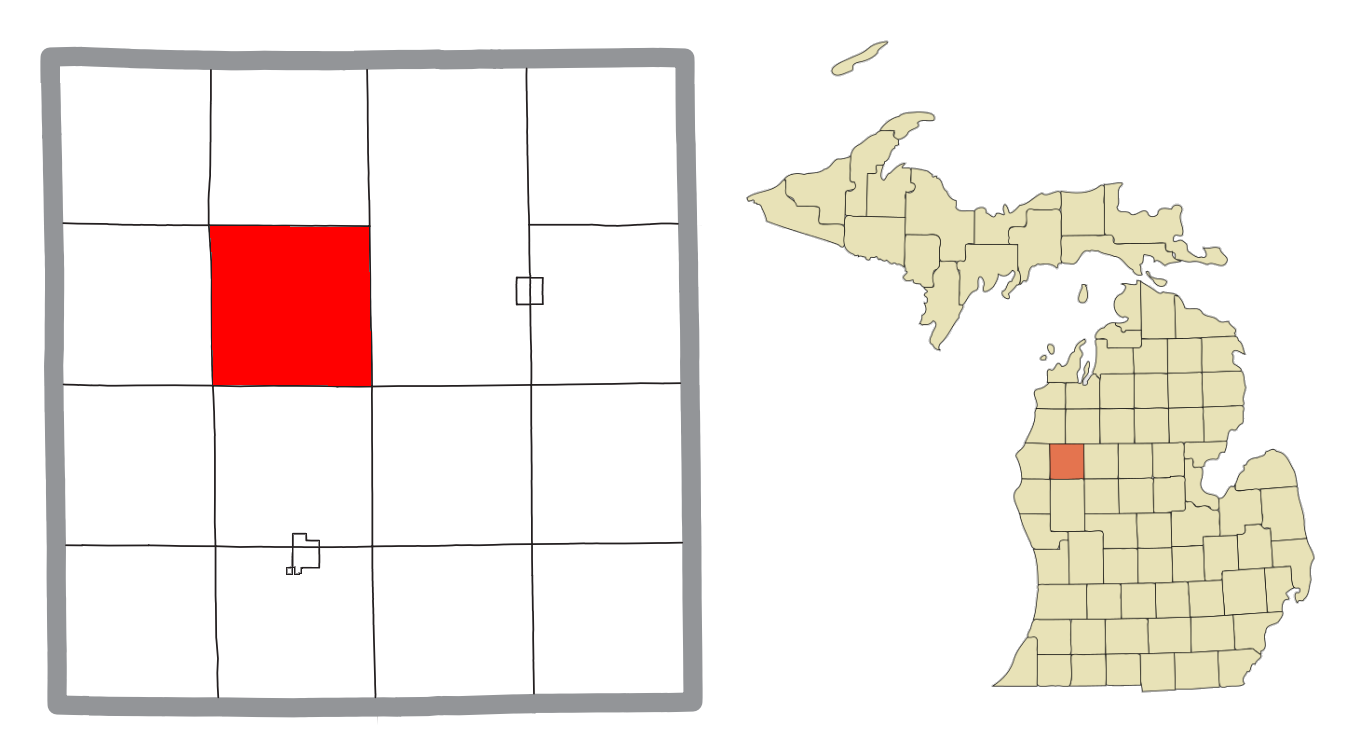
- Location within Lake County

- Location within the state of Michigan Location within the United States
- Coordinates: 44°01′44″N 85°51′46″W
- Country: United States
- State: Michigan
- County: Lake

Area
  - Total: 35.8 sq mi (92.7 km^{2})
  - Land: 34.8 sq mi (90.2 km^{2})
  - Water: 0.93 sq mi (2.4 km^{2})
- Elevation: 1,007 ft (307 m)

Population (2020)
  - Total: 398
  - Density: 11.4/sq mi (4.41/km^{2})
- Time zone: UTC-5 (Eastern (EST))
  - Summer (DST): UTC-4 (EDT)
- ZIP code(s): 49644
- Area code: 231
- FIPS code: 26-63120
- GNIS feature ID: 1626887
- Website: https://peacocktownship.org/

Peacock Township is a civil township of Lake County in the U.S. state of Michigan. The population was 398 at the 2020 census.

== Geography ==
According to the United States Census Bureau, the township has a total area of 35.8 square miles (93 km^{2}), of which 34.8 square miles (90 km^{2}) is land and 0.9 square miles (2.3 km^{2}) (2.63%) is water.

== Communities ==
- Peacock is an unincorporated community located northwest of the center of the township. The town hall is located in Peacock.
- Wolf Lake is an unincorporated community along the 44th parallel. It is east of a lake named the same name.

== History ==
Peacock was the name of a station on the Chicago and West Michigan Railroad (later known as the Pere Marquette Railway), 15 miles north of Baldwin. It was named for David J. Peacock, who became the first postmaster on April 15, 1897. The Peacock post office was discontinued in 1943.

== Demographics ==
As of the census of 2000, there were 445 people, 220 households, and 144 families residing in the township. The population density was 12.8 per square mile (4.9/km^{2}). There were 1,068 housing units at an average density of 30.7 per square mile (11.9/km^{2}). The racial makeup of the township was 93.93% White, 0.22% African American, 0.90% Native American, 0.22% Asian, 3.37% from other races, and 1.35% from two or more races. Hispanic or Latino of any race were 3.82% of the population.

There were 220 households, out of which 10.0% had children under the age of 18 living with them, 58.6% were married couples living together, 4.5% had a female householder with no husband present, and 34.5% were non-families. 27.7% of all households were made up of individuals, and 10.0% had someone living alone who was 65 years of age or older. The average household size was 2.02 and the average family size was 2.40.

In the township the population was spread out, with 10.8% under the age of 18, 2.7% from 18 to 24, 21.3% from 25 to 44, 37.8% from 45 to 64, and 27.4% who were 65 years of age or older. The median age was 54 years. For every 100 females, there were 113.9 males. For every 100 females age 18 and over, there were 112.3 males.

The median income for a household in the township was $24,167, and the median income for a family was $29,688. Males had a median income of $30,313 versus $22,083 for females. The per capita income for the township was $17,638. About 15.6% of families and 16.8% of the population were below the poverty line, including none of those under age 18 and 12.7% of those age 65 or over.
