= Sauble Township, Michigan =

- Civil township
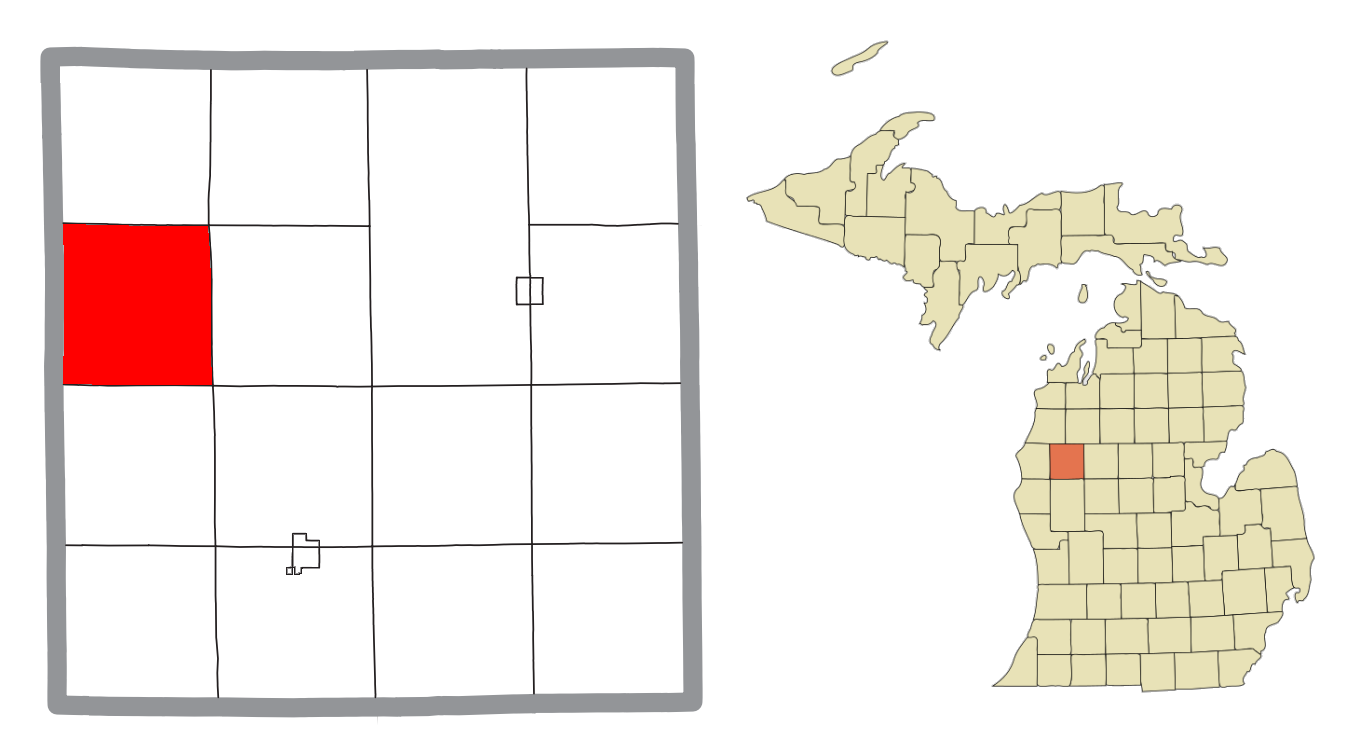
- Location within Lake County

- Location within the state of Michigan Location within the United States
- Coordinates: 44°01′57″N 85°58′36″W
- Country: United States
- State: Michigan
- County: Lake

Area
  - Total: 35.4 sq mi (91.6 km^{2})
  - Land: 34.6 sq mi (89.7 km^{2})
  - Water: 0.73 sq mi (1.9 km^{2})
- Elevation: 751 ft (229 m)

Population (2020)
  - Total: 373
  - Density: 10.8/sq mi (4.16/km^{2})
- Time zone: UTC-5 (Eastern (EST))
  - Summer (DST): UTC-4 (EDT)
- FIPS code: 26-71680
- GNIS feature ID: 1627044
- Website: https://www.saubletwp.org/

Sauble Township is a civil township of Lake County in the U.S. state of Michigan. The population was 373 at the 2020 census.

== Geography ==
According to the United States Census Bureau, the township has a total area of 35.4 square miles (91.6 km^{2}), of which 34.6 square miles (89.7 km^{2}) is land and 0.8 square mile (1.9 km^{2}) (2.12%) is water.

== Demographics ==
As of the census of 2000, there were 323 people, 160 households, and 104 families residing in the township. The population density was 9.3 per square mile (3.6/km^{2}). There were 614 housing units at an average density of 17.7 per square mile (6.8/km^{2}). The racial makeup of the township was 99.38% White, 0.31% Native American, and 0.31% from two or more races. Hispanic or Latino of any race were 2.17% of the population.

There were 160 households, out of which 11.9% had children under the age of 18 living with them, 57.5% were married couples living together, 5.0% had a female householder with no husband present, and 34.4% were non-families. 31.3% of all households were made up of individuals, and 18.8% had someone living alone who was 65 years of age or older. The average household size was 2.02 and the average family size was 2.49.

In the township the population was spread out, with 15.2% under the age of 18, 3.7% from 18 to 24, 15.2% from 25 to 44, 32.8% from 45 to 64, and 33.1% who were 65 years of age or older. The median age was 57 years. For every 100 females, there were 94.6 males. For every 100 females age 18 and over, there were 98.6 males.

The median income for a household in the township was $28,636, and the median income for a family was $30,962. Males had a median income of $38,750 versus $22,917 for females. The per capita income for the township was $18,528. About 6.0% of families and 12.1% of the population were below the poverty line, including 34.2% of those under age 18 and 6.0% of those age 65 or over.
