= Dover Township, Otsego County, Michigan =

Dover Township, Michigan
- Civil township
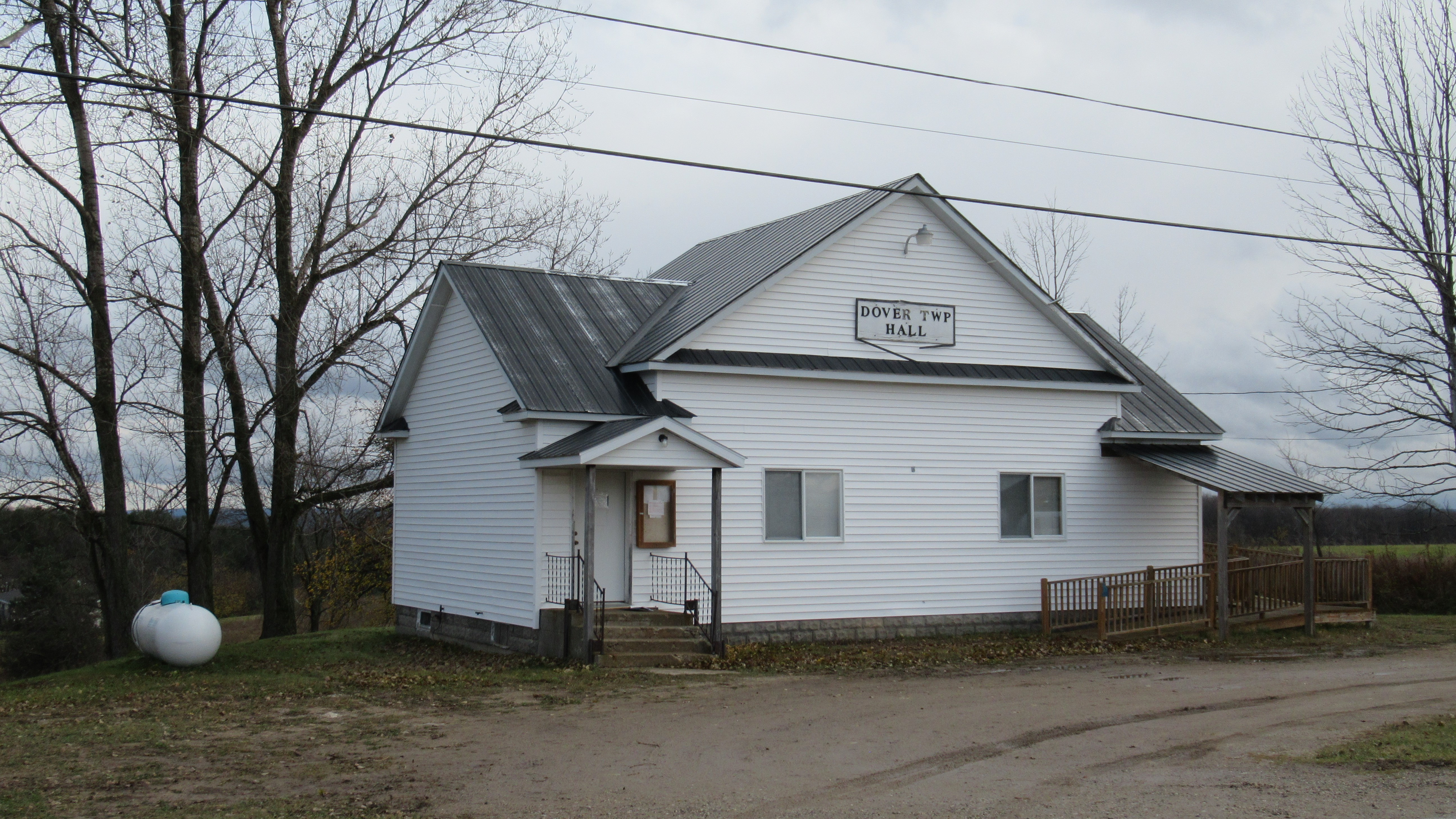
- Dover Township Hall

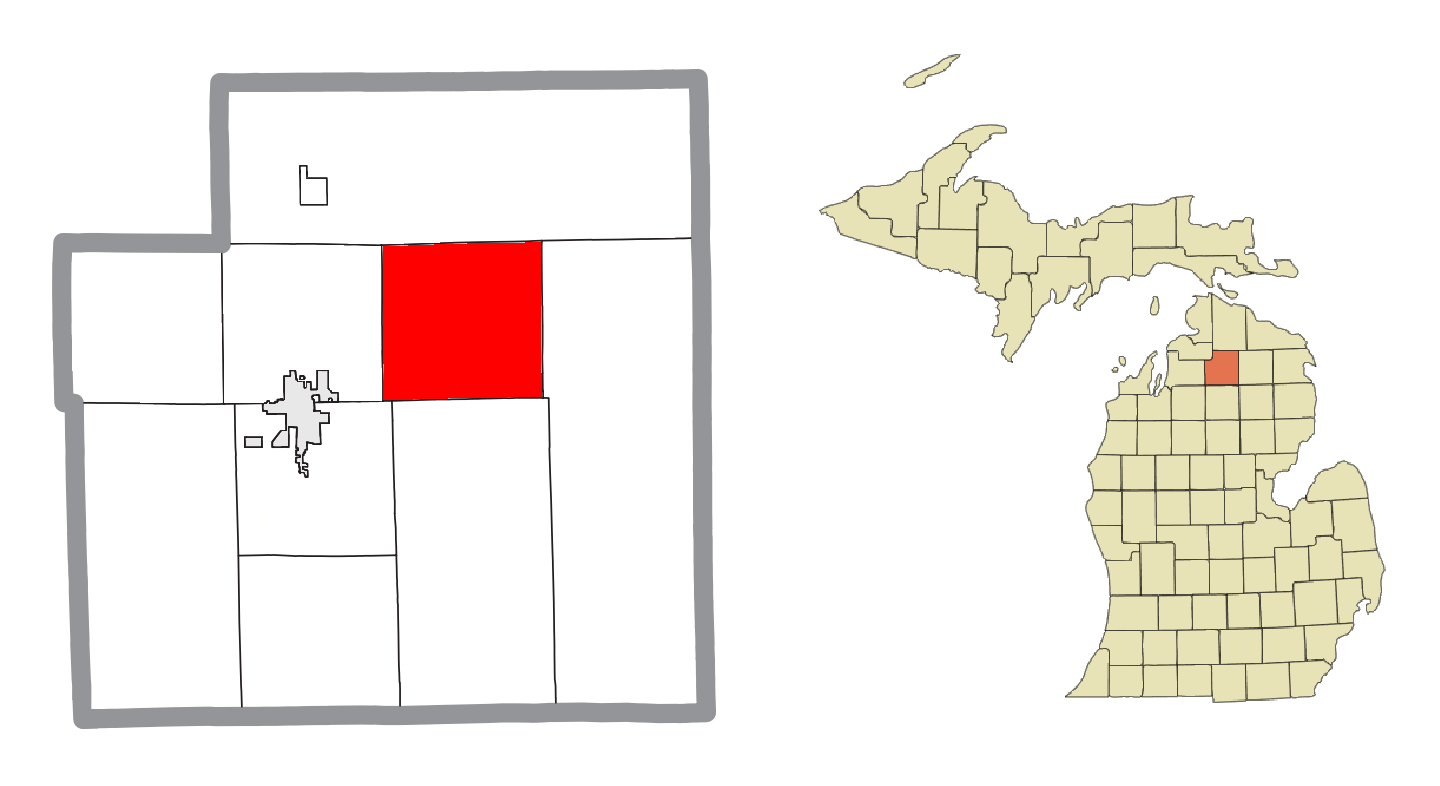
- Location within Otsego County

- Location within the state of Michigan Location within the United States
- Coordinates: 45°04′26″N 84°33′31″W
- Country: United States
- State: Michigan
- County: Otsego
- Established: 1879

Government
  - Supervisor: Rudi Edel
  - Clerk: Janet Kwapis

Area
  - Total: 35.22 sq mi (91.22 km^{2})
  - Land: 35.17 sq mi (91.09 km^{2})
  - Water: 0.039 sq mi (0.10 km^{2})
- Elevation: 1,145 ft (349 m)

Population (2020)
  - Total: 632
  - Density: 18.0/sq mi (6.94/km^{2})
- Time zone: UTC-5 (Eastern (EST))
  - Summer (DST): UTC-4 (EDT)
- ZIP code(s): 49735 (Gaylord)
- Area code: 989
- FIPS code: 26-22840
- GNIS feature ID: 1626190
- Website: https://www.dovertwp-otsegomi.gov/

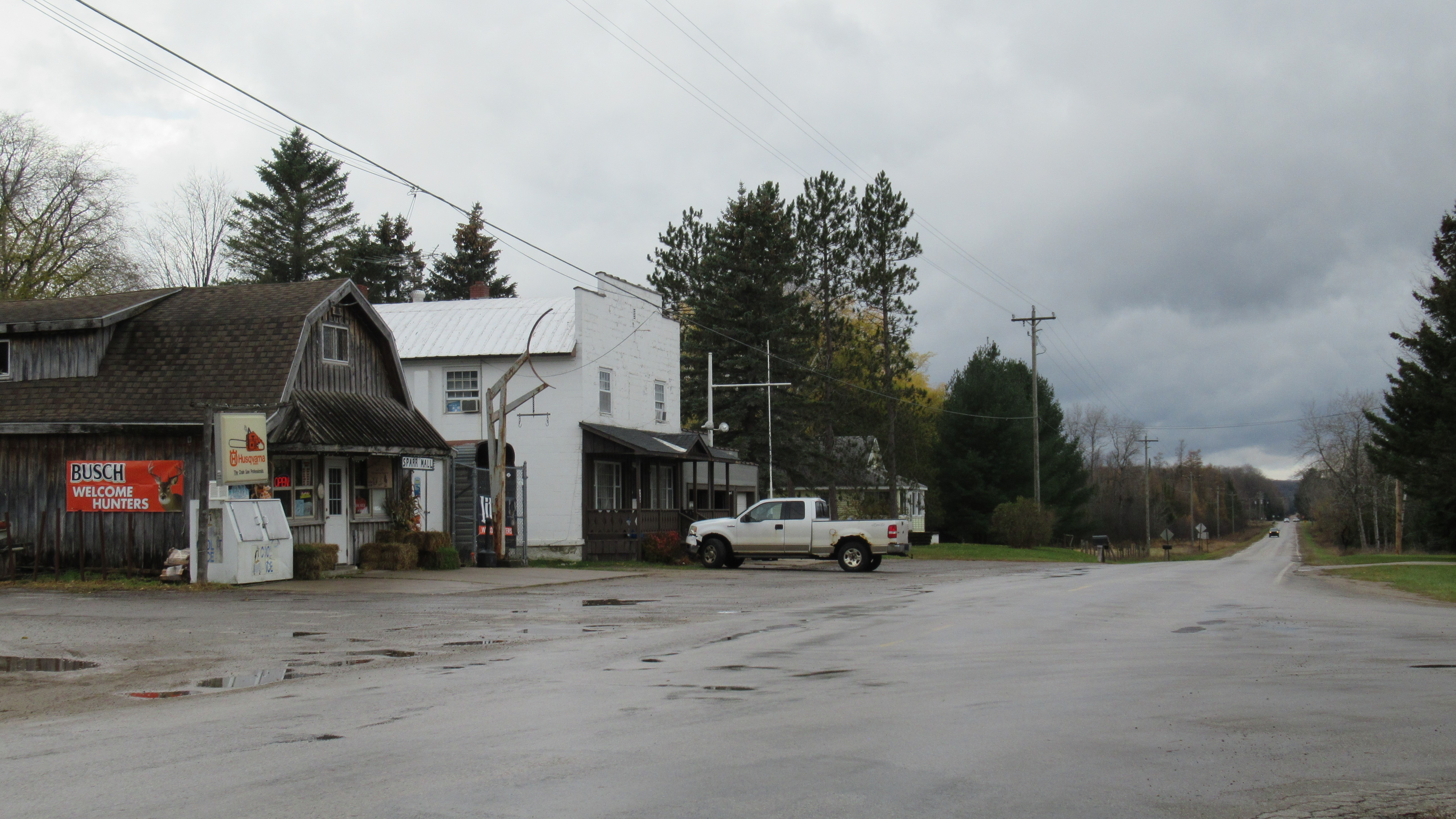
Community of Sparr along F-44

Dover Township is a civil township of Otsego County in the U.S. state of Michigan. The population was 632 at the 2020 census.

== Communities ==
- Sparr is an unincorporated community located within the township along F-44 at 45°02′29″N 84°34′21″W. The area was first settled by William Sparr in 1873 and was named after him. The community of Sparr grew when the Boyne City, Gaylord & Alpena Railroad constructed a line through the township. A post office opened on May 5, 1915, and operated until February 15, 1932.

== Geography ==
According to the U.S. Census Bureau, the township has a total area of 35.22 square miles (91.22 km^{2}), of which 35.17 square miles (91.09 km^{2}) is land and 0.04 square miles (0.10 km^{2}) (0.14%) is water.

== Demographics ==
As of the census of 2000, there were 614 people, 214 households, and 163 families residing in the township. The population density was 17.4 inhabitants per square mile (6.7/km^{2}). There were 368 housing units at an average density of 10.5 per square mile (4.1/km^{2}). The racial makeup of the township was 98.53% White, 0.49% Native American, 0.33% Asian, and 0.65% from two or more races.

There were 214 households, out of which 42.1% had children under the age of 18 living with them, 67.3% were married couples living together, 5.1% had a female householder with no husband present, and 23.4% were non-families. 20.6% of all households were made up of individuals, and 6.5% had someone living alone who was 65 years of age or older. The average household size was 2.86 and the average family size was 3.26.

In the township the population was spread out, with 31.1% under the age of 18, 7.2% from 18 to 24, 30.6% from 25 to 44, 23.0% from 45 to 64, and 8.1% who were 65 years of age or older. The median age was 34 years. For every 100 females, there were 111.7 males. For every 100 females age 18 and over, there were 112.6 males.

The median income for a household in the township was $45,000, and the median income for a family was $48,036. Males had a median income of $31,458 versus $26,042 for females. The per capita income for the township was $22,739. About 4.1% of families and 6.4% of the population were below the poverty line, including 9.0% of those under age 18 and 13.7% of those age 65 or over.
