= Dover Township, Lake County, Michigan =

Dover Township, Michigan
- Civil township
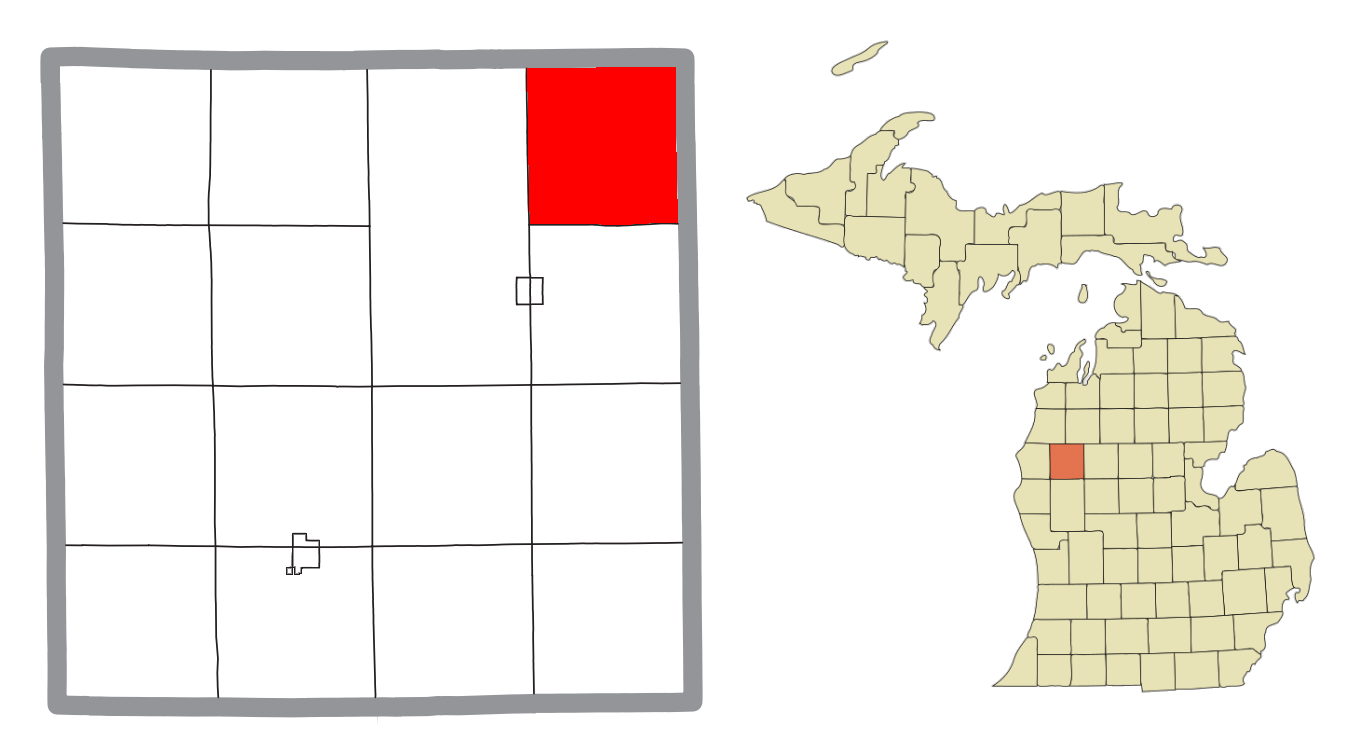
- Location within Lake County

- Location within the state of Michigan Location within the United States
- Coordinates: 44°07′12″N 85°36′23″W
- Country: United States
- State: Michigan
- County: Lake

Area
  - Total: 37.0 sq mi (95.8 km^{2})
  - Land: 36.8 sq mi (95.3 km^{2})
  - Water: 0.19 sq mi (0.5 km^{2})
- Elevation: 1,260 ft (384 m)

Population (2020)
  - Total: 383
  - Density: 10.4/sq mi (4.02/km^{2})
- Time zone: UTC-5 (Eastern (EST))
  - Summer (DST): UTC-4 (EDT)
- FIPS code: 26-22800
- GNIS feature ID: 1626188

Dover Township is a civil township of Lake County in the U.S. state of Michigan. The population was 383 at the 2020 census.

== Geography ==
According to the United States Census Bureau, the township has a total area of 37.0 square miles (95.8 km^{2}), of which 36.8 square miles (95 km^{2}) is land and 0.2 square miles (0.52 km^{2}) (0.49%) is water.

== Demographics ==
As of the census of 2000, there were 332 people, 144 households, and 94 families residing in the township. The population density was 9.0 inhabitants per square mile (3.5/km^{2}). There were 304 housing units at an average density of 8.3 units per square mile (3.2 units/km^{2}). The racial makeup of the township was 97.59% White, 0.30% African American, 0.30% Pacific Islander, 0.30% from other races, and 1.51% from two or more races. Hispanic or Latino of any race were 0.90% of the population.

There were 144 households, out of which 25.0% had children under the age of 18 living with them, 52.1% were married couples living together, 8.3% had a female householder with no husband present, and 34.7% were non-families. 29.9% of all households were made up of individuals, and 14.6% had someone living alone who was 65 years of age or older. The average household size was 2.31 and the average family size was 2.80.

In the township the population was spread out, with 22.0% under the age of 18, 4.5% from 18 to 24, 28.3% from 25 to 44, 26.8% from 45 to 64, and 18.4% who were 65 years of age or older. The median age was 42 years. For every 100 females, there were 95.3 males. For every 100 females age 18 and over, there were 94.7 males.

The median income for a household in the township was $27,344, and the median income for a family was $36,042. Males had a median income of $31,250 versus $21,406 for females. The per capita income for the township was $15,836. About 6.0% of families and 10.7% of the population were below the poverty line, including 6.8% of those under age 18 and 11.3% of those age 65 or over.
