= Lake County, Michigan =

County in Michigan, United States

- County
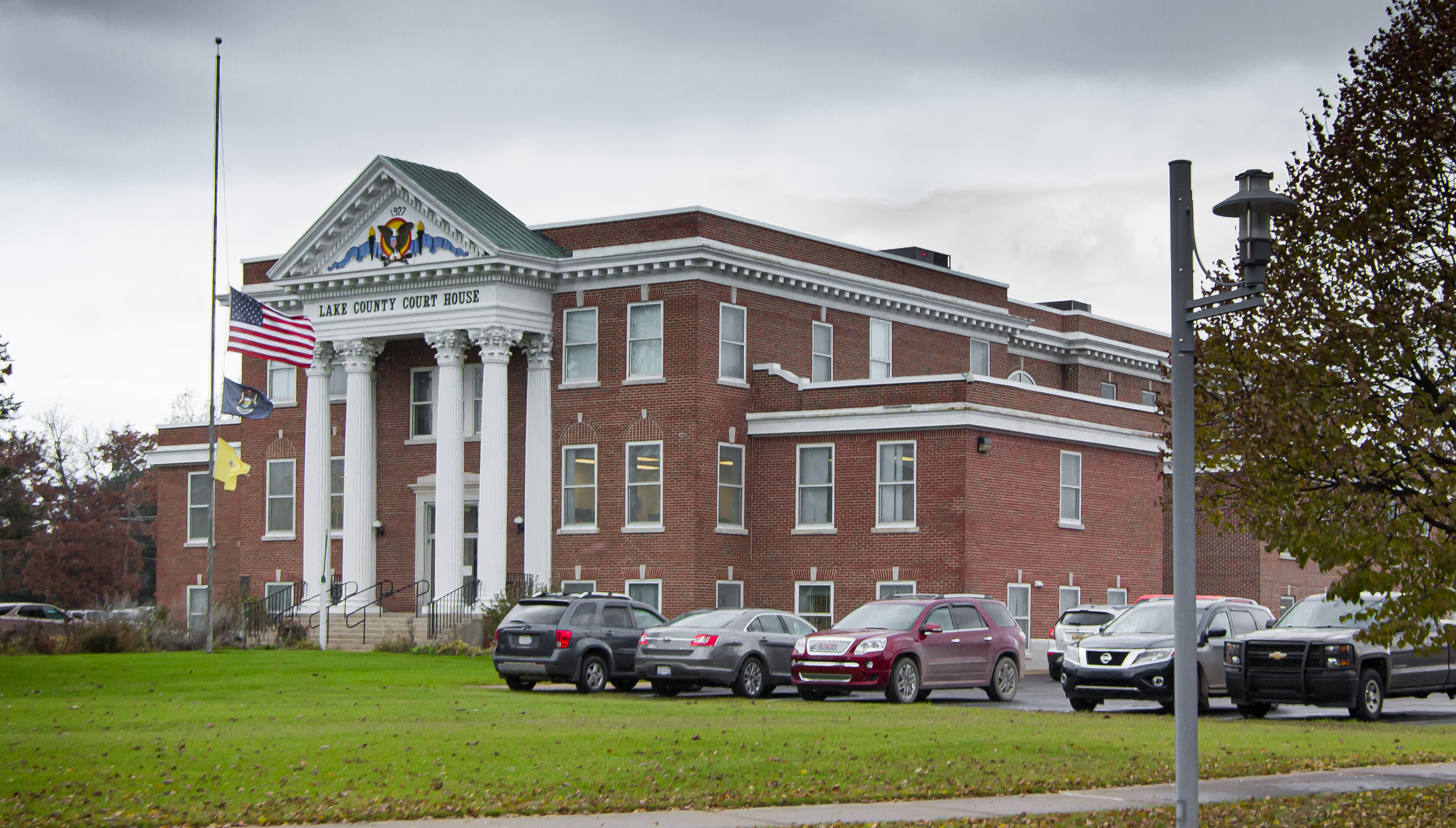
- Lake County Courthouse

- Location within the U.S. state of Michigan
- Coordinates: 43°59′N 85°49′W
- Country: United States
- State: Michigan
- Founded: 1840
- Organized: 1871
- Seat: Baldwin
- Largest village: Baldwin

Area
  - Total: 574 sq mi (1,490 km^{2})
  - Land: 567 sq mi (1,470 km^{2})
  - Water: 6.9 sq mi (18 km^{2}) 1.2%

Population (2020)
  - Total: 12,096
  - Estimate (2025): 13,182 ▲
  - Density: 21.3/sq mi (8.24/km^{2})
- Time zone: UTC−5 (Eastern)
  - Summer (DST): UTC−4 (EDT)
- Congressional district: 2nd
- Website: lakecountymi.gov

Lake County (formerly known as Aischum County) is a county located in the U.S. state of Michigan. As of the 2020 Census, the population was 12,096. The county seat is Baldwin.

== History ==
The county was created by the Michigan Legislature in 1840 as Aischum County (possibly from eshkam meaning "diminishing" in Ojibwe), before being renamed Lake County in 1843 for its many lakes. It was administered by a succession of other Michigan counties prior to the organization of county government in 1871.

== Geography ==
According to the U.S. Census Bureau, the county has a total area of 574 square miles (1,490 km^{2}), of which 567 square miles (1,470 km^{2}) is land and 6.9 square miles (18 km^{2}) (1.2%) is water.

=== State trunkline highways ===
- US 10 enters from Mason County; goes through Baldwin; continues east into Osceola County
- M-37 enters Lake County from Newaygo County; passes through Baldwin; continues north to Wexford County

=== National Protected Area ===
- Manistee National Forest (part)

=== Adjacent counties ===
- Osceola County (east)
- Oceana County (southwest)
- Wexford County (northeast)
- Mason County (west)
- Manistee County (northwest)
- Newaygo County (south)
- Mecosta County (southeast)

== Demographics ==
Historical population
Census	Pop.	Note	%±
1870	548		—
1880	3,233		490.0%
1890	6,505		101.2%
1900	4,957		−23.8%
1910	4,939		−0.4%
1920	4,437		−10.2%
1930	4,066		−8.4%
1940	4,798		18.0%
1950	5,257		9.6%
1960	5,338		1.5%
1970	5,661		6.1%
1980	7,711		36.2%
1990	8,583		11.3%
2000	11,333		32.0%
2010	11,539		1.8%
2020	12,096		4.8%
2025 (est.)	13,182	▲	9.0%
U.S. Decennial Census; 1790-1960 1900-1990; 1990-2000 2010-2018

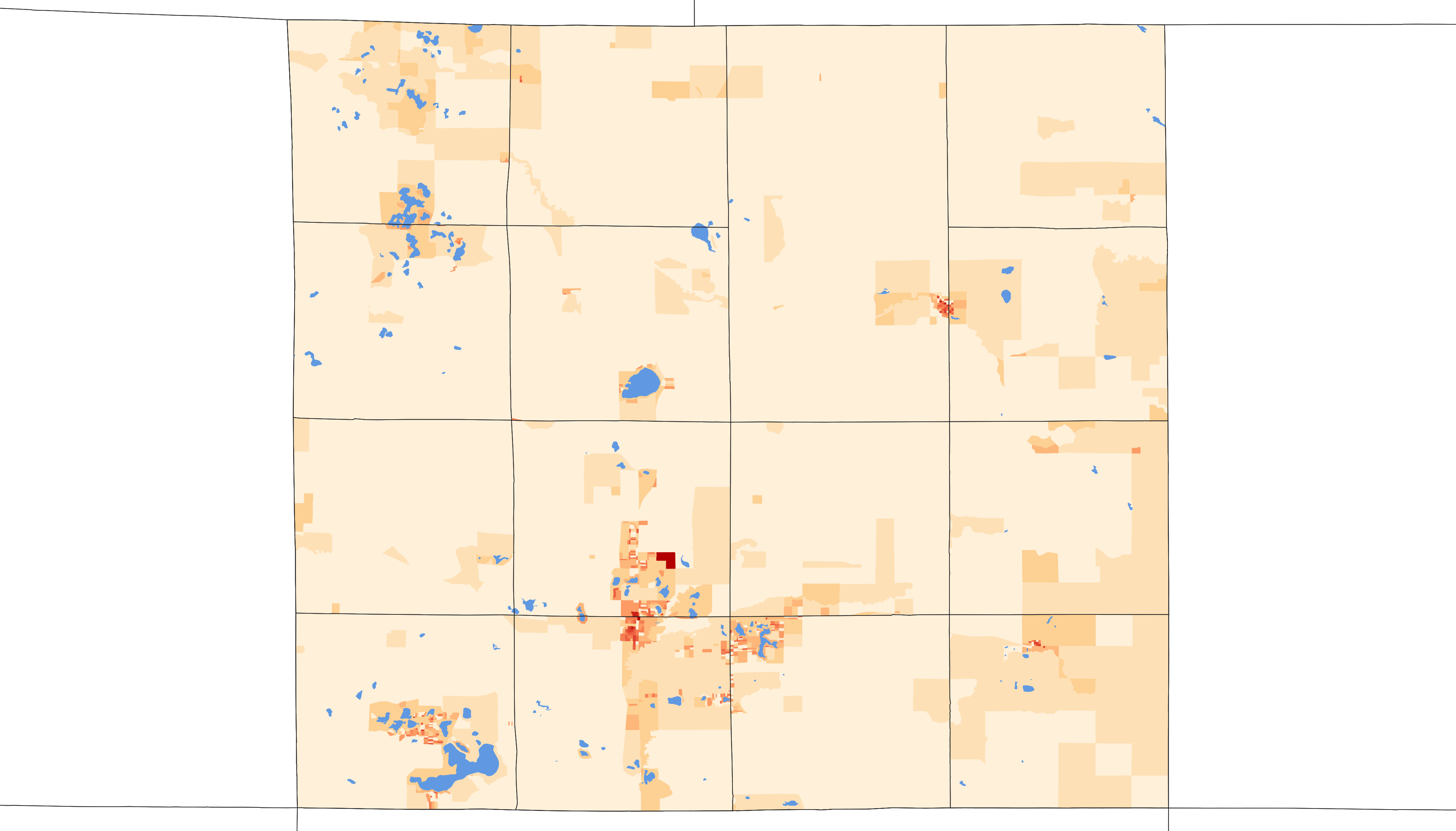
2020 population density of Lake County MI by census block

=== Racial and Ethnic composition ===
Lake County, Michigan – Racial and ethnic composition Note: the US Census treats Hispanic/Latino as an ethnic category. This table excludes Latinos from the racial categories and assigns them to a separate category. Hispanics/Latinos may be of any race.
Race / Ethnicity (NH = Non-Hispanic)	Pop 1980	Pop 1990	Pop 2000	Pop 2010	Pop 2020	% 1980	% 1990	% 2000	% 2010	% 2020
White alone (NH)	6,300	7,297	9,511	9,897	9,360	81.70%	85.02%	83.92%	85.77%	77.38%
Black or African American alone (NH)	1,281	1,142	1,252	1,034	795	16.61%	13.31%	11.05%	8.96%	6.57%
Native American or Alaska Native alone (NH)	50	74	112	78	65	0.65%	0.86%	0.99%	0.68%	0.54%
Asian alone (NH)	7	9	17	16	45	0.09%	0.10%	0.15%	0.14%	0.37%
Native Hawaiian or Pacific Islander alone (NH)	x	x	4	1	8	x	x	0.04%	0.01%	0.07%
Other race alone (NH)	23	1	15	2	24	0.30%	0.01%	0.13%	0.02%	0.20%
Mixed race or Multiracial (NH)	x	x	231	268	604	x	x	2.04%	2.32%	4.99%
Hispanic or Latino (any race)	50	60	191	243	1,195	0.65%	0.70%	1.69%	2.11%	9.88%
Total	7,711	8,583	11,333	11,539	12,096	100.00%	100.00%	100.00%	100.00%	E

=== 2020 census ===
As of the 2020 census, the county had a population of 12,096. The median age was 51.5 years, 15.7% of residents were under the age of 18, and 26.6% were 65 years of age or older. For every 100 females there were 127.3 males, and for every 100 females age 18 and over there were 131.2 males.

The racial makeup of the county was 85.1% White, 7.4% Black or African American, 0.7% American Indian and Alaska Native, 0.4% Asian, 0.1% Native Hawaiian and Pacific Islander, 0.5% from some other race, and 5.9% from two or more races. Hispanic or Latino residents of any race comprised 9.9% of the population.

<0.1% of residents lived in urban areas, while 100.0% lived in rural areas.

There were 5,079 households in the county, of which 19.1% had children under the age of 18 living in them. Of all households, 44.3% were married-couple households, 25.6% were households with a male householder and no spouse or partner present, and 22.7% were households with a female householder and no spouse or partner present. About 35.1% of all households were made up of individuals and 17.2% had someone living alone who was 65 years of age or older.

There were 13,315 housing units, of which 61.9% were vacant. Among occupied housing units, 82.1% were owner-occupied and 17.9% were renter-occupied. The homeowner vacancy rate was 2.8% and the rental vacancy rate was 10.2%.

=== 2000 census ===
As of the 2000 census, there were 11,333 people, 4,704 households, and 3,052 families residing in the county. The population density was 20 people per square mile (7.7 people/km^{2}). There were 13,498 housing units at an average density of 24 per square mile (9.3/km^{2}).

The racial makeup of the county was 84.66% White, 11.17% Black or African American, 1.01% Native American, 0.15% Asian, 0.04% Pacific Islander, 0.57% from other races, and 2.40% from two or more races. 1.69% of the population were Hispanic or Latino of any race. 20.2% were of English ancestry, 20.0% were of German ancestry, 8.4% Irish, and 6.1% Dutch ancestry. 97.5% spoke only English, while 1.3% spoke Spanish at home.

There were 4,704 households, out of which 23.00% had children under the age of 18 living with them, 52.40% were married couples living together, 8.70% had a female householder with no husband present, and 35.10% were non-families. 29.60% of all households were made up of individuals, and 13.80% had someone living alone who was 65 years of age or older. The average household size was 2.28 and the average family size was 2.79.

In the county, 21.90% of the population was under the age of 18, 8.00% was from 18 to 24, 22.70% from 25 to 44, 27.60% from 45 to 64, and 19.70% was 65 years of age or older. The median age was 43 years. For every 100 females there were 109.10 males. For every 100 females age 18 and over, there were 107.60 males.

The median income for a household in the county was $26,622, and the median income for a family was $32,086. Males had a median income of $30,124 versus $21,886 for females. The per capita income for the county was $14,457. About 14.70% of families and 19.40% of the population were below the poverty line, including 28.30% of those under age 18 and 12.00% of those age 65 or over. 24/7 Wall St. reported that Lake County is the poorest county in Michigan.

== Government ==
United States presidential election results for Lake County, Michigan
Year	Republican		Democratic		Third party(ies)	
Year	No.	%	No.	%	No.	%
1884	951	55.42%	656	38.23%	109	6.35%
1888	1,061	54.24%	807	41.26%	88	4.50%
1892	648	47.79%	610	44.99%	98	7.23%
1896	888	60.61%	547	37.34%	30	2.05%
1900	841	68.88%	350	28.67%	30	2.46%
1904	907	79.42%	211	18.48%	24	2.10%
1908	673	68.88%	253	25.90%	51	5.22%
1912	227	24.02%	186	19.68%	532	56.30%
1916	588	60.68%	347	35.81%	34	3.51%
1920	926	74.80%	261	21.08%	51	4.12%
1924	1,069	68.79%	313	20.14%	172	11.07%
1928	1,147	73.06%	409	26.05%	14	0.89%
1932	991	42.86%	1,241	53.68%	80	3.46%
1936	1,091	43.76%	1,337	53.63%	65	2.61%
1940	1,413	56.63%	1,070	42.89%	12	0.48%
1944	1,145	58.84%	794	40.80%	7	0.36%
1948	1,348	54.14%	1,077	43.25%	65	2.61%
1952	1,549	57.46%	1,127	41.80%	20	0.74%
1956	1,614	59.80%	1,083	40.13%	2	0.07%
1960	1,441	52.27%	1,313	47.62%	3	0.11%
1964	791	28.56%	1,978	71.41%	1	0.04%
1968	1,094	39.10%	1,482	52.97%	222	7.93%
1972	1,532	48.93%	1,548	49.44%	51	1.63%
1976	1,598	41.96%	2,179	57.22%	31	0.81%
1980	1,730	43.22%	2,041	50.99%	232	5.80%
1984	2,125	53.09%	1,845	46.09%	33	0.82%
1988	1,713	46.32%	1,958	52.95%	27	0.73%
1992	1,194	26.26%	2,351	51.72%	1,001	22.02%
1996	1,213	27.61%	2,606	59.31%	575	13.09%
2000	1,961	41.79%	2,584	55.06%	148	3.15%
2004	2,503	47.71%	2,675	50.99%	68	1.30%
2008	2,269	42.88%	2,919	55.16%	104	1.97%
2012	2,487	46.84%	2,752	51.83%	71	1.34%
2016	3,159	58.96%	1,939	36.19%	260	4.85%
2020	3,946	62.32%	2,288	36.13%	98	1.55%
2024	4,523	65.41%	2,298	33.23%	94	1.36%

United States Senate election results for Lake County, Michigan1
Year	Republican		Democratic		Third party(ies)	
Year	No.	%	No.	%	No.	%
2024	4,257	62.91%	2,250	33.25%	260	3.84%

Michigan Gubernatorial election results for Lake County
Year	Republican		Democratic		Third party(ies)	
Year	No.	%	No.	%	No.	%
2022	3,055	58.08%	2,081	39.56%	124	2.36%

The county government operates the jail, maintains rural roads, operates the major local courts, keeps files of deeds and mortgages, maintains vital records, administers public health regulations, and participates with the state in the provision of welfare and other social services. The county board of commissioners controls the budget but has only limited authority to make laws or ordinances. In Michigan, most local government functions — police and fire, building and zoning, tax assessment, street maintenance, etc. — are the responsibility of individual cities and townships.

=== Board of Commissioners ===
- District 1 commissioner: Robert Sanders, vice chair
- District 2 commissioner: Howard Lodholtz, chairman
- District 3 commissioner: Kristine Raymond, vice chair pro tem
- District 4 commissioner: Dawn Fuller
- District 5 commissioner: Mike Seroczynski
- District 6 commissioner: Jamie Russell
- District 7 commissioner: Clyde Welford

=== Elected officials ===
- Chief Trial Court Judge: David M. Glancy
- Prosecuting Attorney: Tom Evans
- Sheriff: Richard L. Martin
- County Clerk/Register of Deeds: Patti Pacola
- County Treasurer: Kellie Allen
- County Surveyor: Patrick Johnson

=== County departments ===
- County Administrator: Tobi Lake
- Code Official: David Wright
- Equalization Director: Anthony Meyaard
- 911 Director: Brian Virden
- Emergency Management Director: Jake Carter
- Veterans Affairs Rep: Nicole Barton
- Information Technology (IT): Mike Flees

(information as of March 2026)

== Communities ==
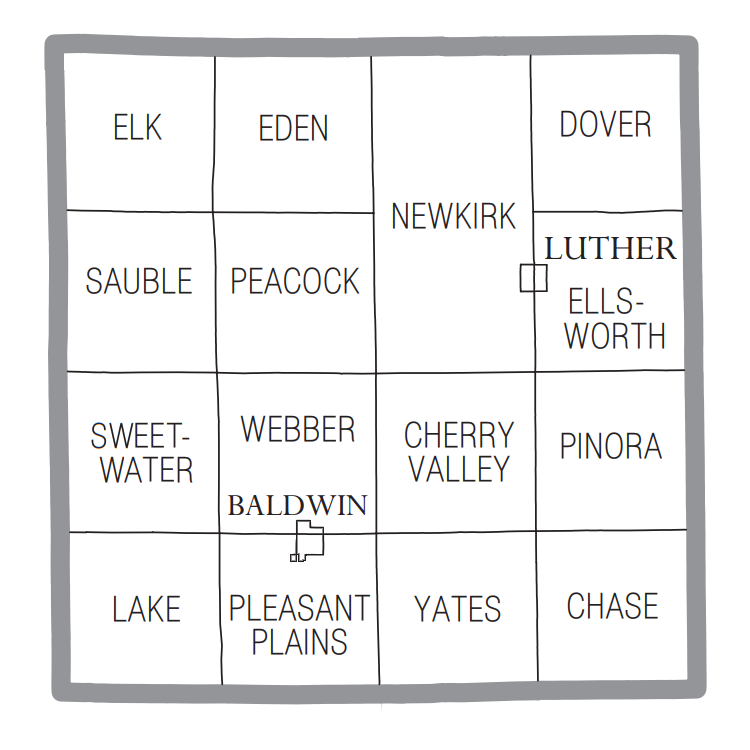
U.S. Census data map showing local municipal boundaries within Lake County

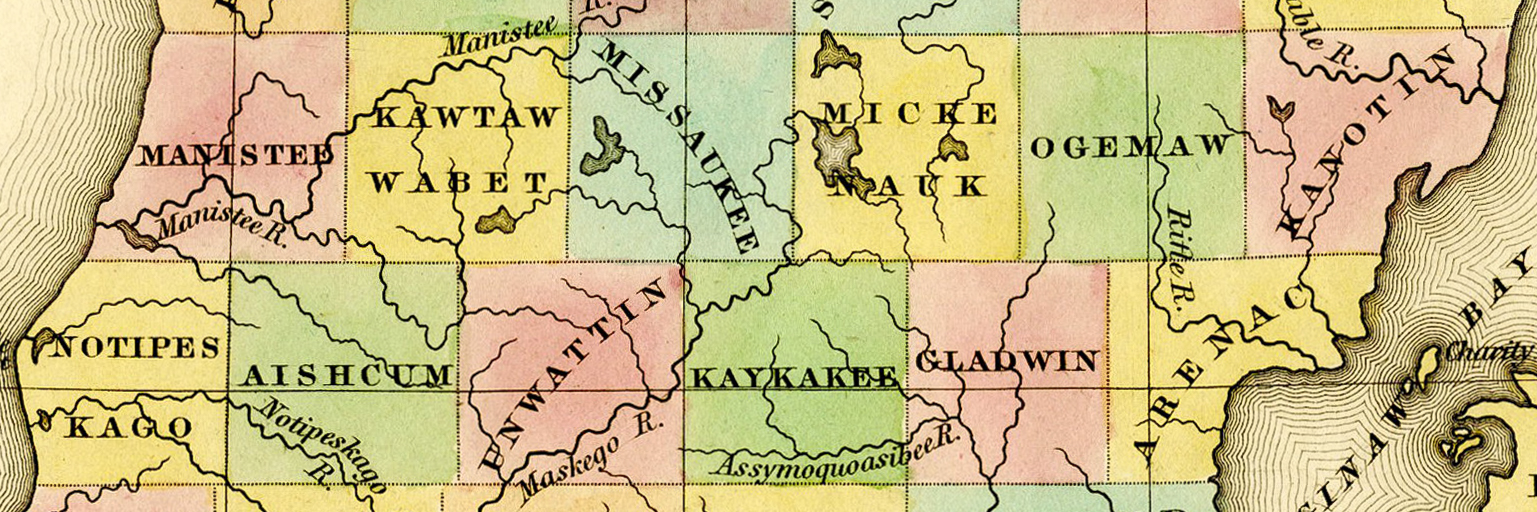
A detail from A New Map of Michigan with its Canals, Roads & Distances (1842) by Henry Schenck Tanner, showing Lake County as Aishcum, the county's name from 1840 to 1843. Several nearby counties are also shown with names that would later be changed.

=== Villages ===
- Baldwin (county seat)
- Luther

=== Civil townships ===
- Chase Township
- Cherry Valley Township
- Dover Township
- Eden Township
- Elk Township
- Ellsworth Township
- Lake Township
- Newkirk Township
- Peacock Township
- Pinora Township
- Pleasant Plains Township
- Sauble Township
- Sweetwater Township
- Webber Township
- Yates Township

=== Other unincorporated communities ===
- Branch (partially)
- Chase
- Idlewild
- Irons
- Peacock
- Sauble
- Wolf Lake

== Education ==
The West Shore Educational Service District, based in Ludington, services the districts in the county along with those of Mason and Oceana counties. The intermediate school district offers regional special education and general education services, as well as technical career programs for its students.

Lake County is served by the one regular public school district, Baldwin Community Schools.

== See also ==
- List of Michigan State Historic Sites in Lake County, Michigan
- National Register of Historic Places listings in Lake County, Michigan
