= Harlem Magicians =

Basketball entertainment team

Poster for a basketball event featuring the Harlem Magicians

Harlem Magicians was a basketball enterprise founded in 1953 by Lon Varnell through his Varnell Enterprises, that was similar in fashion and activities to the famous exhibition basketball team the Harlem Globetrotters. The full name of the barnstorming basketball team was the Fabulous Harlem Magicians with the main star attraction of the team being Marques Haynes. Haynes had been a member of the Globetrotters, but had left the team due to a contract dispute to join the Magicians. Other famous players in the team were Goose Tatum, comic Sam "Boom" Wheeler, Josh Grider, Ron Cavenall, and Bob "Ergie" Erickson (who once stole the ball from Haynes four times in one game). Dempsey Hovland, founder of 20th Century Booking Agency and himself owner of several barnstorming teams, was recruited to book the Harlem Magicians' games.

In late 1961, Abe Saperstein, founder and owner of the Harlem Globetrotters, filed a lawsuit against Lon Varnell for alleged violation of Harlem Globetrotters' registered trademarks, "Harlem Globetrotters" and "Magicians of Basketball" by promoting a basketball team known as the "Harlem Magicians". In 1964, the parties settled the litigation by entering a consent decree approved by the District Court for the Southern District of New York.
