= African Americans in sports =

Discussions of race and sports in the United States, where the two subjects have always been intertwined in American history, have focused to a great extent on African Americans. Depending on the type of sport and performance level, African Americans are reported to be over- or under-represented. African Americans compose the highest percentage of the minority groups active at the professional level, but are among those who show the lowest participation overall. And though the list of African Americans in professional sports remains high, it only represents a small fraction of aspiring black athletes.

== History ==
The Journal of African American History's (JAAH) Special Issue on African American participation in sports in the 19th and 20th centuries demonstrates that African Americans have often used sports to challenge the social subjugation of their communities and stigma of the society.

=== Early history ===
On the large slave plantations, the popular male sports were wrestling, boxing, racing, hunting, and fishing. The most popular recreations for women were dancing and singing. David Wiggins says the masters typically tolerated the slaves' pastimes as long as they were ready to work when called upon. The slave children improvised their games. Girls, for example, favored "ring dances", accompanied by songs and riddles.

==== "Black athletic superiority" theory ====
"Black athletic superiority" is the theory that black people possess certain traits that are acquired through genetic and/or environmental factors that allow them to excel over other races in athletic competition. Whites are more likely to hold these views; however, some blacks and other racial groups do as well. A 1991 poll in the United States indicated that half of the respondents agreed with the belief that "blacks have more natural physical ability in endurance, but in strength the whites win".

Various hypotheses regarding racial differences of black and white people and their possible effect on sports performance have been put forth since the later part of the nineteenth century by professionals in many various fields. In the United States, attention to the subject faded over the first two decades of the twentieth century as black athletes were eliminated from white organized sport and segregated to compete among themselves on their own amateur and professional teams. Interest in the subject was renewed after the 1932 Summer Olympics in Los Angeles and Jesse Owens's record-breaking performances at the 1935 Big Ten Track Championships. Regarding Jesse Owens's impressive four-gold medal performance in the following 1936 Olympics, the then U.S. head coach remarked that "The Negro excels. It was not long ago that his ability to sprint and jump was a life-and-death matter to him in the jungle. His muscles are pliable, and his easy going disposition is a valuable aid to the mental and physical relaxation that a runner and jumper must have."

In 1971, African-American sociologist Harry Edwards wrote: "The myth of the black male's racially determined, inherent physical and athletic superiority over the white male, rivals the myth of black sexual superiority in antiquity." Later in 2003, the JBHE Foundation published an article in The Journal of Blacks in Higher Education, where they pushed back against this idea of a "black gene" leading to black superiority in athletics, a concept referred to here as "Racist Theory". The JBHE contended that "If there is a 'black gene' that leads to athletic prowess, why then do African Americans, 90 percent of whom have at least one white ancestor, outperform blacks from African nations in every sport except long distance running?"

=== Segregated seating ===
In 1960, the Houston Oilers implemented a policy at Jeppesen Stadium to segregate the black fans from the white fans. Clem Daniels, Art Powell, Bo Roberson, and Fred Williamson of the Oakland Raiders refused to play in a stadium that had segregated seating. The 1963 game against the New York Jets was relocated to a different stadium.

== Overview ==
In 2013, while 2.8% of full-time degree-pursuing undergraduates were black men, the group comprised 57% of college football teams, and 64% of men's basketball players, according to Shaun R. Harper. While blacks predominate in football and basketball, whites predominate in many other regulated sports.

In the words of William Ellerbee, basketball coach at national powerhouse Simon Gratz High School in Philadelphia, "Suburban kids tend to play for the fun of it. Inner city kids look at basketball as a matter of life and death" (Price, 1997a). Thus, one might speculate that black inner city kids, whose stature in their community is defined by their physical prowess (Hoberman, 1997) start earlier in life, practice more hours, experience greater activity specific developmental changes, and possess greater self-efficacy in sports such as basketball, football and track than white youth. Pseudo-scientific conceptions of race continue to play a role in the way many in the United States understand African-American contributions to sports.

Unlike black athletes, blacks as a group have not perceived sports as an important venue to prosperity. There are higher participation rates by blacks as well as higher numbers of people in non-athletic endeavor, such as policy, teaching, physicians, lawyers, engineers, and architects.

== By league ==
African Americans accounted for 75% of players in the National Basketball Association (NBA) near the end of 2008. According to the latest National Consortium for Academics and Sports equality report card, 65% of National Football League players were African Americans. However, in 2008, about 8.5% of Major League Baseball players were African American (who make up about 13% of the US population), and 29.1% were Hispanics of any race (compared with about 16% of the US population). In 2020, less than 5% of the National Hockey League (NHL) players are black or of mixed black heritage.

NCAA sports have mirrored the trends present in American professional sports. During the 2005–2006 season, black males comprised 46.9 percent of NCAA Football Bowl Subdivision (FBS) and 58.9 percent of NCAA Division I basketball. The NCAA statistics show a strong correlation between percentage of black athletes within a sport and the revenue generated by that sport. For example, University of North Carolina's 2007–2008 men's basketball team (the team was 59% black relative to the 3.7% black population of the institution as a whole) generated $17,215,199 in revenue, which comprised 30 percent of the school's athletic revenue for the year. Given NCAA rules prohibiting the payment of players, some have come to see the structure of NCAA athletics as exploitative of college athletes. Some believe that since black athletes comprise a high percentage of athletes in high revenue college sports (FBS football and Division I Men's basketball), they are therefore the biggest losers in this arrangement. Billy Hawkins argues that "the control over the Black male's body and profiting off its physical expenditure is in the hands of White males." His position refers to a very high percentage of Division I universities controlled by white administrations that prosper greatly from the free labor produced by the revenue sports that are heavily populated by black athletes. This claim is substantiated by statistics, such as the 2005–2006 NCAA Division I men's basketball tournament in which games started, and minutes played for black athletes were over double that of their white counterparts, with 68.7 percent of scoring in the tournament coming from black players.

=== Major League Baseball ===
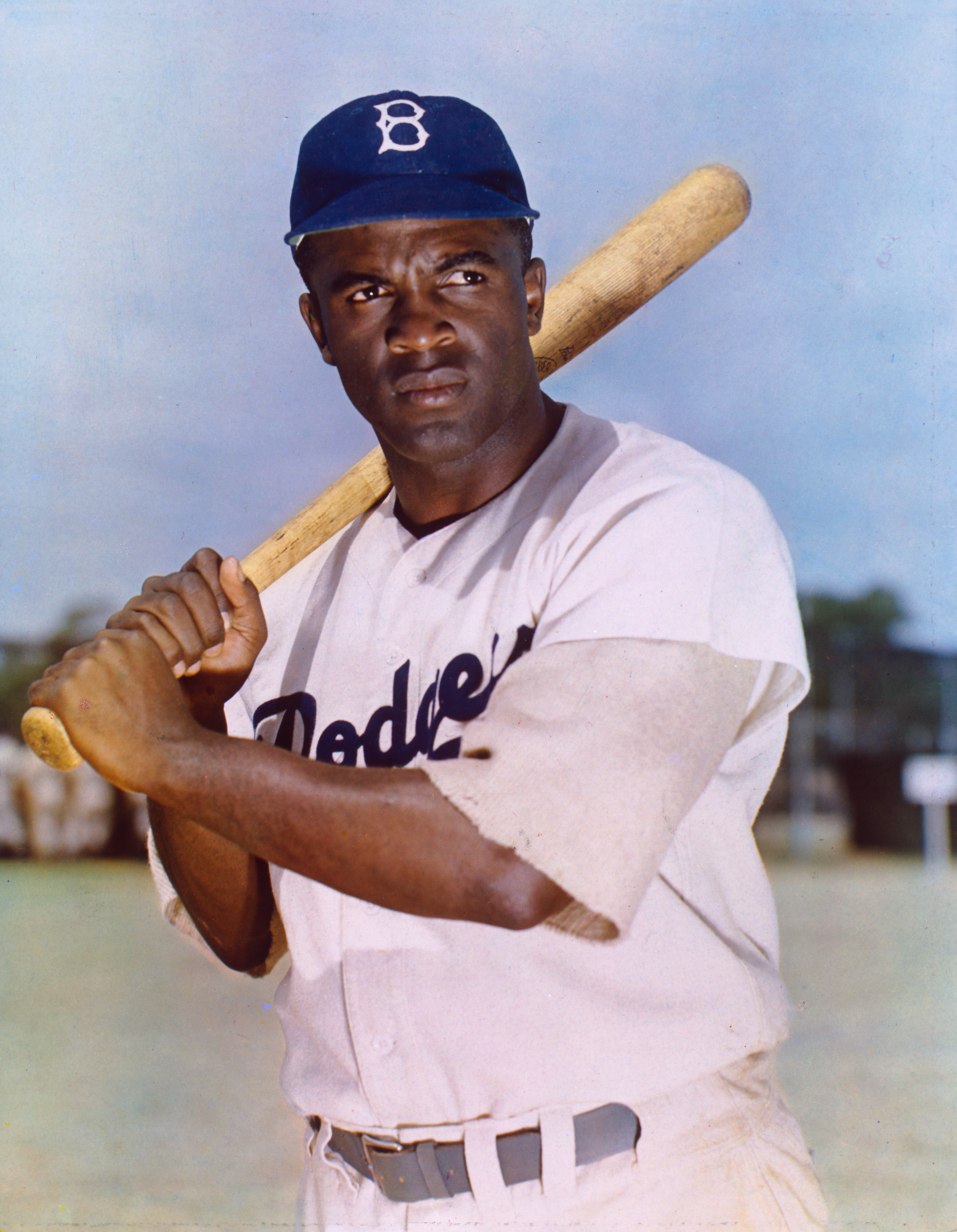
Jackie Robinson

Jackie Robinson was the first African American to play a major league game on April 15, 1947. Jackie loved the sport of baseball but that wasn't his only goal to make the majors. He wanted to make a way for more African Americans to join the league. However, with struggles of people being racist in the stands, players spouting off racial slang words to other players or fans, etc. Jackie wasn't discouraged to the hate as he was not only one of the best African Americans to play the game but one of the best in the history of baseball.

African Americans in American baseball
| Year | Major leagues | Population | Ratio |
| 1945 | 2% | 10% | 1:5 |
| 1959 | 17% | 11% | 3:2 |
| 1975 | 27% | 11% | 5:2 |
| 1995 | 19% | 12% | 3:2 |

In a journal titled Using Giddens's Structuration Theory to Examine the Waning Participation of African Americans in Baseball, it says "Numerous studies have shown that African-American youths are more likely than Whites to be encouraged and even directed to play basketball over other sports."

=== National Basketball Association ===
Although Japanese-American Wataru Misaka broke the National Basketball Association's color barrier in the 1947–48 season when he played for the New York Knicks, 1950 is recognized as the year the NBA integrated. That year African-American players joined several teams; they included Chuck Cooper with the Boston Celtics, Nat "Sweetwater" Clifton with the New York Knicks, and Earl Lloyd with the Washington Bullets.

In another example from an interview with NBA Hall of Famer Kareem Abdul-Jabbar he states "For people of color, professional sports has always been a mirror of America's attitude toward race: as long as Black players were restricted from taking the field, then the rest of Black Americans would never truly be considered equal, meaning they would not be given equal educational or employment opportunities." Jabbar played in the NBA for 20 seasons dating back to 1969.

=== National Football League ===
Black players participated in the National Football League from its inception in 1920; however, there were no African-American players from 1933 to 1946. There is a great deal of speculation as to why this "gentleman's agreement", as it came to be called, was implemented during this era. Some argue that it was purely because of the Great Depression. Jobs were difficult to come by, and thus race relations became increasingly strained as African-Americans, and other minorities, became perceived as "threats". Finally, in 1946, the Los Angeles Rams broke this unofficial "agreement" and drafted Kenny Washington along with Woody Strode in the same year. The final NFL team to break this agreement was the Washington Redskins, who signed Bobby Mitchell in 1962.

In October 2018, George Taliaferro, the first African American who played in the NFL died at the age of 91. While George was the first African American drafted to play in the NFL, the first African American would not be drafted as the Quarterback until 1953, when Willie Thrower was drafted to play with the Chicago Bears. It wouldn't be for another 14 years, 1967, until the first African American, Emlen Tunnell, would be elected for the NFL Hall of Fame.

=== National Hockey League ===
On November 16, 1926, Native American Taffy Abel joined the New York Rangers, breaking the NHL color barrier and making history as the first ever Native American to play in the National Hockey League since its founding in 1917. On January 18, 1958, Willie O'Ree joined the Boston Bruins in a game against the Montreal Canadiens, making history as the first ever black person to play in the National Hockey League. Some 16 years later, Mike Marson became the second black player to join the league with his expansion to the Washington Capitals. Decades later, a 2020 analysis revealed that people of color still comprise less than 5% of players in the National Hockey League and that out of 377 head coaches hired over 102 years, only one has been black.

Though black people are evidently under-represented in the National Hockey League, this is not at all reflective of their involvement in the sport and its development. In 1895–22 years before the establishment of the National Hockey League—the Colored Hockey League took form in Nova Scotia, Canada. This was hockey's first ever organized league, and at its peak contained hundreds of players throughout more than a dozen teams. The season ran from late January to early March as they were only allowed access to the ice rinks when the white-only leagues finished their seasons, leaving the Colored Hockey League with the worst of the ice conditions and subsequently with a much shorter season. Political and racial tensions forced the league to disintegrate in 1905 as they were no longer allowed to use arenas at all, regardless of the time of year. In 1921, the league re-formed on a smaller scale with just three teams but struggled to gain and keep traction. By the mid-1930s, the National Hockey League had become hugely popular while the Colored Hockey League had disappeared altogether.

Despite the many barriers imposed on the Colored Hockey League, they were reportedly just as competitive as the white-only leagues while demonstrating a faster and more aggressive style of play and making revolutionary contributions to the sport. The illustrious slapshot, for example, was invented by Colored Hockey League star Eddie Martin and later popularized by white players in the National Hockey League. Additionally, Henry "Braces" Franklyn was the first goalie to go down on to the ice to make saves; this 'butterfly style' was also popularized many years later by white players and remains a staple of the modern game.

=== Professional Golfers' Association ===
Throughout the game's history, golf has not included many African-American players, and they were often denied the opportunity to golf. The Professional Golf Association of America (PGA) fought hard [...] and successfully maintained its all-white status. Black golfers (then) created their own organization of touring professionals." In 1961, the "Caucasians only" clause was struck from the Professional Golfers' Association of America constitution.

Tiger Woods has had a major impact on the game of golf, especially among minorities. The article, African-Americans and Golf, a Brief History, states "With the ascent of Tiger Woods and his golf game comes an increased interest and participation from young minorities in the game. He himself envisions this impacting in the next ten years as they come of age and develop physically as well." Woods hopes minority participation will continue to increase in the future.

The research surrounding descriptions employed about White and Black athletes in the media and how the stereotypes of Black athletes has affected Tiger Woods in a majority white sport, because Tiger Woods was the only Black golfer on the PGA tour, he received different comments related to Black stereotypes that the other golfers on the tour did not.

African American participation in golf has been increasing. In a journal titled African American Culture and Physical Skill Development Programs: The Effect on Golf after Tiger Woods, it says "Smith (1997) reported data from a National Golf Foundation (NDF) study in the United States indicating there are 676,000 African-American golfers (2.7% of the 24.7 million golfers)." According to the article Where are all the black golfers? Nearly two decades after Tiger Woods' arrival, golf still struggles to attract minorities, As of 2013 there were 25.7 million golfers, with 1.3 million of them being African-Americans. The lack of diversity is still very apparent in golf today.

== Discrimination ==
The baseball color line, which included separate Negro league baseball, was one example of racial segregation in the United States.

In the United States, a study found that a form of racial discrimination exists in NBA basketball, as white players received higher salaries than do blacks related to actual performance. Funk says this may be due to viewer discrimination. Viewership increases when there is greater participation by white players, which means higher advertising incomes. This explains much of the salary gap.

=== Promoting racial harmony and breaking stereotypes ===
Racial differences in the NFL are also evident between player positions. According to an Undefeated article, all positions have remained strongly overrepresented by African American players in the period between 1999 and 2014, with African Americans outnumbering white Americans in several positions. However, this effect has been less pronounced for the center and quarterback positions: in 1999, the percentage of white players in the center position was 75% compared to 20% for African Americans, while the percentage of white players in the quarterback position was 81% compared to 18% for African American; though white Americans outnumbered African Americans in these positions, the percentages nonetheless showed significant overrepresentation of African Americans (~13% of the total population of the US) among both center and quarterback players compared to white Americans (~82% of the total population). In 2014, the center position showed more proportionate representation―with 81% being white and 16% African American―while the number of white quarterback players had decreased slightly within the same time frame (coinciding with a 1% increase in black quarterbacks). A study by the University of Colorado examining racial stereotypes towards NFL quarterbacks found that "black participants stereotyped both races more strongly...suggesting that black players may not believe they are cut out to be a professional quarterback". The study goes on to say that, "the terms physical strength and natural ability were more associated with the black quarterbacks while leadership and intelligence was more associated with white quarterbacks". These biases are thought to reflect how football players are viewed by the general populace, and ostensibly have an impact on perceptions among adolescents as well.

The history of racial tension in the competition between whites and minority groups shows an attempt to prove the humanity, equality, and even occasionally their superiority on the playing field. By doing so, groups of minorities hoped that sports would serve as a source for racial pride that would eventually lead to upward social mobility. However, as early as 1984, criticism has been levied against these ideas. Sports sociologist Harry Edwards openly criticized African Americans as being "co-conspirators" in their own children's exploitation by the white dominated sports establishment. Edwards asserted that stereotypes such as the “dumb jocks” were not born but rather socially created and fuelled by low expectations, their communities, and educational institutions that overly encourage athletic persists. Despite the perception of a white dominated sports establishment, research has shown that there is greater emphasis on sports as a potential career path in the African American community compared to the White community. Edwards continued by arguing that placing so much emphasis on sports achievement as a way for minority groups, specifically referring to African Americans, to achieve some level of prominence is de-emphasizing the importance of intellectual pursuits. John Hoberman, in Darwin's Athletes: How Sport Has Damaged Black America and Preserved the Myth of Race, suggest that this fixation on the importance of athletic ability in the African American community has steered many youth away from more realistic occupational pursuits. He suggests that this idea is further reinforcing the concept of innate black athletic superiority. Despite the conflicting perceptions of sports as a harmonizing instrument, many researchers still believe that not much has changed to alleviate the racially tense landscape many believe to be inherent in current day society.

== Activism ==
=== National Basketball Association ===
Following the emergence of the Trayvon Martin case, NBA players including LeBron James, Dwyane Wade, Chris Bosh, and other Miami Heat players at the time posed for a picture in hoodies, the outfit that Trayvon Martin was wearing when killed. In December 2014, LeBron James and other Cleveland Cavaliers including Kyrie Irving wore black t-shirts featuring the quote "I CANT BREATHE" following the death of Eric Garner who was put in a choke hold by a New York police officer. Since then, LeBron James has been in public disputes Via Twitter and Instagram, shaming Donald Trump and news analyst Laura Ingraham who openly told LeBron James to "shut up and dribble", suggesting that LeBron is only good for his athletic abilities. LeBron then went and turned that slogan "Shut up and dribble" into the Title of his Showtime Series that aired in October 2018. The show focuses on athletes who are shifting the narrative of what it means to be a black athlete in the sense that nowadays more and more athletes are speaking up on political and racial topics going on in the United States.

=== National Football League ===
In a 2016 pre-season game against the San Diego Chargers, Colin Kaepernick, a quarterback for the San Francisco 49ers, chose to kneel instead of standing in solidarity with his teammates for the National Anthem. He did this to raise awareness for victims of police brutality and oppression of minorities in America. Many people believe Kaepernick is a hero for raising awareness for important social issues. However, his actions caused a massive backlash by fans and the media who decried him for acting anti American and disrespecting American troops. Furthermore, players from other teams began to kneel instead of stand with the national anthem. When questioned by the media, he claimed, "I am not going to stand up to show pride in a flag for a country that oppresses black people and people of color." He continued, "If they take football away, my endorsements from me, I know that I stood up for what is right." According to NFL policy, "There is no rule saying players must stand during the national anthem".

Kaepernick's act inspired many other players to also kneel during the national anthem. Bob McNair, owner of the Houston Texans, claimed, "They can't have the inmates running the prison" during a meeting with owners and no current players. After the meeting finished, Troy Vincent, former cornerback for the Miami Dolphins, claimed, "In all my years of playing in the NFL, I have been called every name in the book, including the N-word-but never felt like an inmate". Many players took to social media to protest the racist rhetoric of Bob McNair. Richard Sherman tweeted in response, "I can appreciate ppl being candid. Don't apologize! You meant what you said. Showing true colors allows ppl to see you for who you are". Damon Harrison Sr. tweeted, "...Did that wake some of y'all up now?".

Kaepernick claimed to be blackballed by all 32 teams following being released for his on the field protest in support of the Black Lives Matter movement. Ads following his release have focused on a simple tagline "Believe in something. Even if it means sacrificing everything." In 2019, Hip Hop artist and businessman Jay-Z partnered with the NFL in promoting their social justice efforts. As a supporter Kaepernick's efforts to protest police brutality against the black people of America, Jay-Z became an intermediary between the NFL and the black community. Alongside NFL commissioner Roger Goodell, Jay-Z has made efforts to make things right in the relationship between Kaepernick and the NFL by arranging a workout for the former 49ers QB to showcase his talents to all teams in need of a Quarterback. Later in 2019, Kaepernick and the NFL agreed to hold a workout session to showcase Kaepknick's talents as a competitive Quarterback and potential Super Bowl contender. Many disagreements about the transparency of the workout and accusations that Kaeperknick simply wants to manipulate the situation for profit circulate around social media. Kaeperknick remains without a team despite many teams' need for a Quarterback.

== International history ==
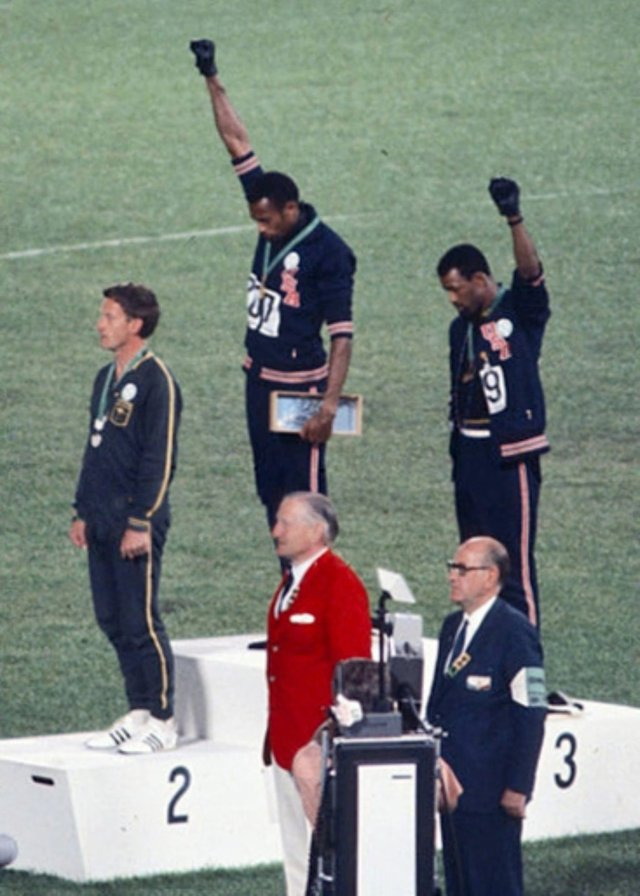
The famous 1968 Olympics Black Power salute

During the Cold War, the American government sought to use black athletes to demonstrate the level of racial equality achieved in the United States. Over time, these athletes began to challenge the government's narrative and used international exposure to advocate for greater equality.

== In popular culture ==
=== Cinema ===
While there are discrepancies in "based on a true story" sports movies, the movies are still representing the harsh realities of race and sports well. One movie that received critical acclaim was 42. This movie was the story of Jackie Robinson, a young man who was the first black player in the MLB. This movie focused on the journey Robinson took throughout his first year in the major leagues, going through the ups and downs. There were some moments that critics felt like producers could have given more depth to different characters, but overall the film represented that time in America and sports well.

Some movies about black athletes do not focus completely on the aspect of race. The 2001 movie Ali, a film about boxer Muhammad Ali, was another story about the journey through his life, but only briefly focused on racial aspects. There were mentions of some of his career after the assassinations of Malcolm X and Martin Luther King Jr., but most of the film reflected on Ali and his personal journey that had little to do with the color of his skin. In 2022 a film was announced about the 1956 Sugar Bowl, which included the first black player to play in a college bowl game in the deep south.

== See also ==
- List of African American sportspeople
- Black participation in college basketball
- Black players in American professional football
- Iowa Colored Cowboys
