= Leon Bates (labor leader) =

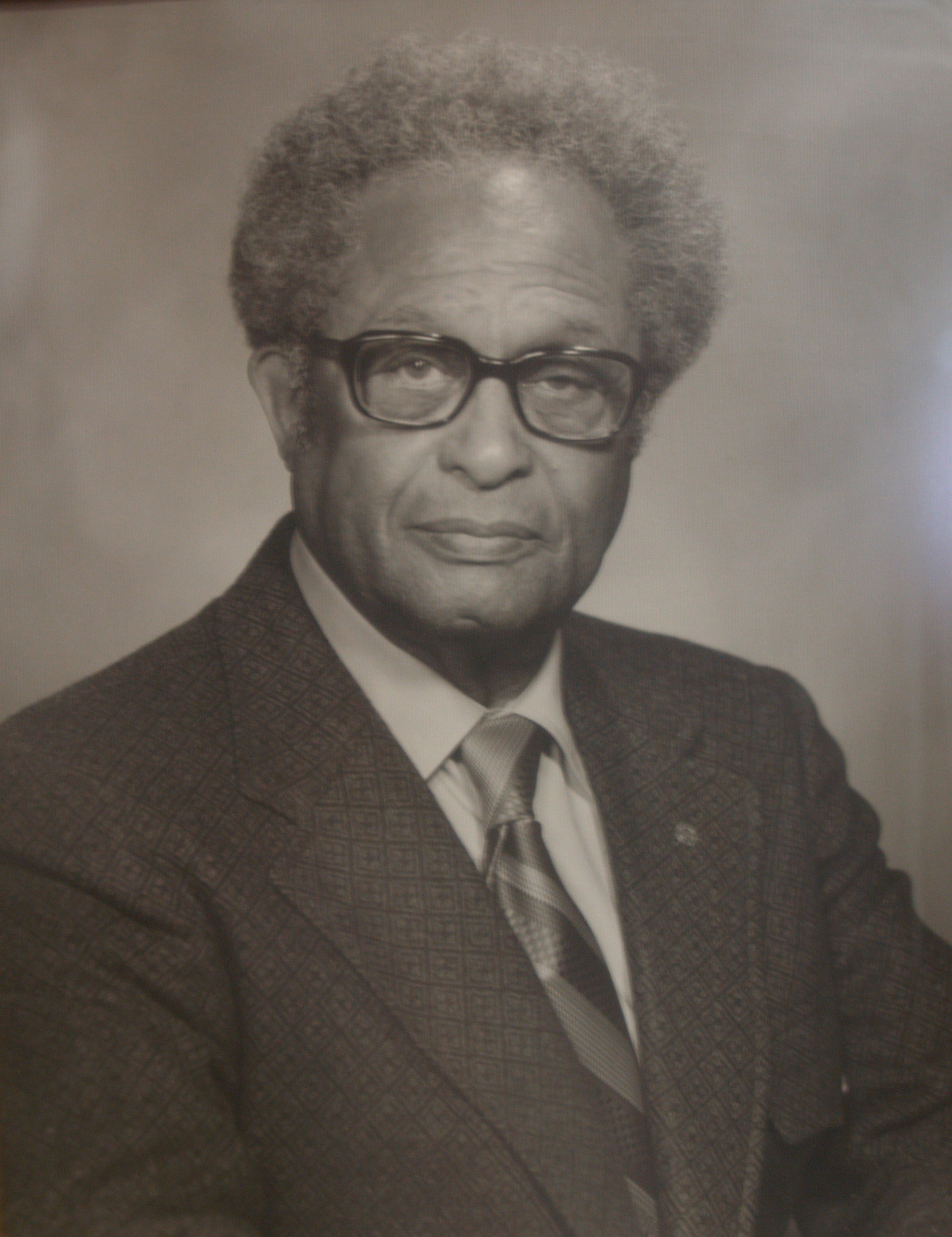
Leon Bates photographed after his retirement from the UAW in 1964

Leon E. Bates Sr. (December 3, 1899 – July 25, 1972) was an American labor union leader with the United Auto Workers union (UAW) from 1937 to 1964 when he retired as an "International Representative" of the UAW. He was one of the first African-American union organizers to work for the "UAW-CIO" (Congress of Industrial Organizations).

== Biography ==
Leon Bates was born in Carrollton, Missouri, to Werner Bates and Matilda (White) Bates. He attended the Lincoln Institute at Jefferson City, Missouri, for one year before moving to Detroit with relatives to seek work in the manufacturing plants during the boom years around the First World War. At the end of the war, he remained in Detroit while his relatives returned to Carrollton. In Detroit he met and married Anna L. Perry; they had two children. In his own words he had many different jobs in the years between the World Wars, including cab driver, common laborer, and he even considered trying his hand at home-made liquor during Prohibition. However, his bootleg liquor-making thoughts were very short lived as he was convinced that every knock at the door would be the police. The Detroit Police Department had a very long and well-deserved reputation of police abuse and abusive tactics, and he had no desire to go to prison.

By 1935, Bates was working at the Briggs Manufacturing Company of Detroit, Michigan; a company founded in 1909 by Walter Briggs, Sr. Walter Briggs, Sr. had worked his way up to Vice President of the B.F. Everitt Company (car body makers) in 1906. In 1909 he acquired the Everitt Company and incorporated it in to the newly formed Briggs Manufacturing Company. Briggs Manufacturing would later become one of the country's largest auto body manufacturers; supplying parts to Ford, Chrysler, Packard, Hudson Motors, Studebaker and many others. Briggs Manufacturing became a division of the Chrysler Corporation in 1956.

== Organizing ==
Throughout the 1920s and 1930s, labor movements in the United States saw progress through hardship. The United Mine Workers would be involved in one of the longest and bloodiest fights of their history in 1920 and 1921. The violence began on May 19, 1920, when simmering hostilities between mine workers trying to organize and the private detectives hired by the mine owners trying to keep the union out, boiled over in the tiny community of Matewan, West Virginia in what has come to be known as the Battle of Matewan. The violence culminated in the Battle of Blair Mountain where 10,000 to 15,000 armed miners confronted police, militia, and private detectives in August 1921. It finally took military intervention by the Federal government to restore peace to the area.

The Brotherhood of Sleeping Car Porters was organized by the predominantly Negro Pullman Porters in 1925. The "BSCP" suffered through a lengthy fight to achieve recognition by the American Federation of Labor (AFL) in 1935. BSCP signed its first collective bargaining agreement with the Pullman Company in 1937.

The International Brotherhood of Teamsters, formerly known as "International Brotherhood of Teamsters, Chauffeurs, Warehousemen and Helpers of America", had been involved in an intense struggle to organize since 1901. Between 1901 and 1935, the Teamsters engaged in countless small and large bloody and deadly confrontations over the right to organize and collectively bargain for wages and working conditions. As their early name implies, the Teamsters took in the related workers in order to strengthen its bargaining position with owners and management.

== UAW years ==
While at Briggs, Bates became involved in the organized labor movement, he worked passionately for the organized labor cause at Briggs. By 1937, the UAW-CIO had organized and signed a collective bargaining agreement with the Briggs Manufacturing Company. Through that effort Leon Bates became one of the most outspoken union stewards of UAW Local #212. In 1937 Briggs was the fourth largest employer of Negroes in the Detroit area with more than 1,300 or approximately 10% of its total payroll. The UAW-CIO was keenly aware of this fact; so their leadership made the decision to include the Negro workers in the organizing efforts. This decision ran contrary to the social, economic, and business norms of the day as the vast majority of labor unions were segregated at that time and simply would not accept Negro membership. The UAW-CIO was so concerned about the issue of Negro participation that the UAW-International Office sent out a letter encouraging each local to elect at least one Negro delegate to its 1937 convention. Leon Bates was one of two Negro delegates elected to represent Local #212 at the 1937 UAW convention. Even though the UAW had organized Briggs, not all of its employees were union members; in 1937 Local #212 renewed its efforts organise the remaining employees. Placing special emphasis on the Negro employees Local #212 formed a "Negro organizing committee" composed of the Negro union stewards. Each of them was tasked with recruitment in department and assigned areas without a steward. At the time Chief Steward Leon Bates, had 81 men [Negro men] assigned to his department on his shift, all but two were members of Local #212.

1937 was a big year for the UAW. They had organized Chrysler and General Motors and they were having a significant amount of success with organizing the smaller parts suppliers and manufacturers, i.e., Midland Steel Products, Kelsey-Hayes, Bohn Aluminum, Fisher Body, and Timken Axle.

The UAW had been working on organizing the Ford Motor Company employees for some time, then came May 26, 1937 and the UAW's clash with the Ford Motor Company security guards sometimes known as the "Ford Service Department", led by Harry Bennett. This violent confrontation has come to be known as the Battle of the Overpass. Just before the afternoon shift change the UAW organizers were posing for press photographers when they were suddenly and viciously attacked by Ford security guards at gate #4 of the Ford River Rouge Complex. The violence was a publicity nightmare for Ford. Henry Ford had repeatedly stated that he would never sign an agreement with any union. Ford had gone out of his way to undermine the UAW's efforts at his plant. When token donations to Detroit charities and churches were not enough, Ford turned to Harry Bennett and the Ford Service Department with its union busting tactics. Henry Ford also quietly gave money to Negro charities and churches, occasionally showing up at Negro church functions. Henry Ford used these occasions to enlist the help of Negro ministers to influence the Negro community of Detroit against the unions.

For their part, the UAW took some time to heal their wounds and refine their tactics, then they returned to the Ford organizing efforts.

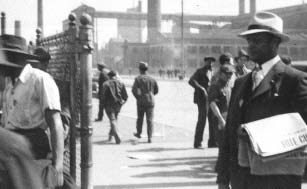
Leon Bates handing out UAW literature during the 1941 organizing drive at the Ford Motor Company - River Rouge plant.

In September 1940 the UAW intensified its efforts to organize Ford with the assistance of the CIO. John L. Lewis president of the United Mine Workers and president of CIO put the full support of the CIO behind the UAW's efforts. The CIO sent Michael Widman to Detroit to head-up the overall organizing drive. The UAW had previously appealed to the Negro workers, but now their efforts were being stepped up. For their part the UAW knew that if they were going to be successful they needed to organize and recognize every man in the plant that they could. At this point the UAW brought in seven Negro organizers, Leon Bates and John Conyers Sr. were the first hired. UAW president R. J. Thomas picked Local #212 president Emil Mazey to be the director of the UAW Negro organizing effort. From the UAW's prospective, Mazey was a logical and a safe choice. Mazey had come to prominence for his organizing work at Briggs during the sit-down strikes. Mazey was respected and trusted by the many Negro workers of Briggs and the Negro stewards. In 1937 Mazey had unseated Local #212's first president Homer Martin an avowed racist. Mazey ended the exclusion of negro workers at union social events and hired a Negro secretary over the objections of the White secretaries in the Local #212 office. Local #212 and had fought to eliminate racial pay differentials for equal work. Still the Negro organizers were not happy that a white man had been put in charge of the "Negro effort" and complained bitterly first to the UAW - Interracial Department and then directly to the UAW Executive Board. In response Walter Hardin (a Negro) was quickly transferred in from a Chicago assignment to be the coordinator.

The UAW divided the Ford organizing drive in Detroit into two separate districts [EastSide and Westside] headed by Leon Bates and John Conyers Sr. Each office had a staff of clerks and secretaries, and latter personnel to handle transportation issues were brought in. Bates and Conyers met with Ford workers in their homes, coffee shops, and restaurants, they met with larger groups at local churches. During the Ford drive the organizers worked extremely long hours, most of them outside of the office. The UAW created a family atmosphere by organizing wives clubs, they also strengthened their relationships with the National Association for the Advancement of Colored People, Urban League, Michigan Democratic Party and the national Democratic Party.

The Ford organizing drive ended June 20, 1941 when the Ford Motor Company signed a collective bargaining agreement with the UAW-CIO. This was six months before the United States entered World War II after Japan attacked the U.S. Navy Base at Pearl Harbor, Hawaii on December 7, 1941. With the agreements settled between the UAW and the "Big Three Automakers", the UAW-CIO Negro organizers found themselves squarely in the middle of a new battle. The United States was gearing up for the largest military effort in history, a two front war, when the conflict came to head on the home front in the form of "hate strikes" and "Jim Crow" policies. At Packard Motors, White workers had refused to work with Negro workers, after the plant managers refused to reassign the newly promoted and reassigned Negro workers citing the Fair Employment Practices Committee rules and the War Labor Board policies, in protest; the White workers walked off the job. As a result, the Negro organizers found themselves in the unusual position of advocating for their union at the same time fighting to reform their union. Pushed by the Negro organizers, the UAW urged the U.S. Government to sanction the companies for the labor policies and practices. The UAW also enforced its own sanctions on its members; declaring the strikes improper and against union rules and policies, the UAW international ordered the employees back to work, or they would remove the local union leadership, and the UAW would support the termination of any and every participant of the strike who refused to return to work immediately.

In the summer of 1941 the dust was far from settling on many labor issues in and around the Detroit area, and the UAW leadership was becoming better organized and business savvy. Leon Bates accepted a new assignment in Indianapolis, Indiana. Even though Ford, Chrysler, General Motors, Dodge, Packard, Hudson, and many other manufacturers had signed collective bargaining agreements many areas had yet to fully form local unions, ratify the agreements, or cease Jim Crow policies and practices. Even though the UAW-CIO had an official non-discrimination policy and position; many locals had segregated divisions and some plants had altogether separate locals which were segregated. This was the situation in many Indianapolis plants when Leon Bates arrived as a staff representative of the UAW's International Office. One of his first and toughest assignments was the International Harvester Foundry, on Brookville Road, on Indianapolis's far East Side. At the time International Harvester maintained a Jim Crow system of management at its Indianapolis Foundry with two Locals (Local #226 and #998). Officially the division was because of skill and job classification i.e., local #998 was the local that Mold Makers, Millwrights, Electricians, Pipefitters, Machine Operators, etc. belonged to. Local #226 consisted of Laborers, Loaders, and Helpers which were considered Negro jobs. During the war, and through the civil rights era Leon Bates worked on behalf of the UAW cause, and for job equality; often these were not the same thing.

One of Bates' duties was to regularly visit the surrounding local unions; to assist with organizing efforts, "elected official" union training, grievance resolution, and discrimination investigation. He had to drive many miles through many small unfriendly towns; long before the modern interstate highway system at the height of the Jim Crow era in the United States. He had to drive for extended periods with nowhere to rest, sometimes sleeping in his car because hotels would not allow Negroes to stay in their establishments. When he arrived in a town with no accommodations for Negroes; he would then find a semi friendly Gas Station where he would be allowed to "freshen-up" in a rest room; in order to present a professional appearance to the company management and local union members. Sometimes when he would visit small communities he would be welcomed by local Negro families and Negro churches, who gratefully provide him with a home cooked meal and a place to rest.

Although he was an UAW Representative, Bates was known to give harsh verbal reprimands to UAW members who were not pulling their own weight on the job, and trying to hide behind union membership for protection. Bates also served in the capacity of Director of the International Harvester Council which served as the committee that represented all the Locals whose members worked for that company. He also served at the time of retirement, as Director of the Skilled Trades Council. This Council represented all Skilled Trades members. These Councils also had duties that included them as members of the Bargaining Committee which bargained for the National Contract for their respected members.

== Retirement ==
In 1964 Leon Bates retired from the UAW as an International Representative of the UAW. He and his wife Anna moved permanently from Indianapolis to their lake front vacation home in the small community of Idlewild, Michigan. His retirement was an active one, he was appointed UAW Region 3 Representative for Retirees, and immediately got himself elected Yates Township, Lake County, Michigan Supervisor and County Board Member. He was the first African American elected to the Lake County, Michigan Board of Commissioners. He continued to work in Democratic Party Politics at both the state and national levels traveling to events and functions across the region and country. At the time of his death in 1972 he was running for reelection as Township Supervisor, when he fell from his boat and drowned in Lake Idlewild.

His funeral was attended by both State and National Democratic Party Officials, UAW Officials, he was eulogized by then UAW President Leonard Woodcock and UAW Secretary - Treasurer Emil Mazey.

UAW Local #226's Union Hall in Indianapolis, is named "Reuther - Bates Hall" in memory of Walter Reuther and Leon Bates.

Leon Bates is buried in the Yates Township Cemetery in Idlewild, Michigan.

== See also ==
- Timeline of labor issues and events
- List of strikes
