= Hotel Casa Bonita =

1950s African American resort

Coordinates: 43°53′50″N 85°46′31″W

Hotel Casa Bonita was a resort in Idlewild, Michigan and a cultural landmark of African American vacationers and entertainers during the 1950s and 1960s, hosting musicians such as Louis Armstrong, Count Basie and Aretha Franklin. In 2025, the National Trust for Historic Preservation designated the hotel as one of America's Most Endangered Places.

== History ==
Hotel Casa Bonita was built in 1949 by Woolsey Coombs, a Black architect. The picturesque brick building opened for guests in 1950, located at 1396 E. Hall Road in the small African American resort town of Idlewild, Michigan. Hotel Casa Bonita was included in The Negro Motorist Green Book and was seen as a safe haven for black community during the Jim Crow era, when segregation and racism limited venue options for touring musicians and destinations for travelers.

Reservations sold out quickly among middle class African American families and cultural figures, who had great demand for rooms at the hotel during the 1950s and 1960s. In the basement was a bar that served liquor and other beverages 24 hours a day, as well as a restaurant where many prominent African American figures engaged with each other in dining salons. In the summer, rooms were sold for about $7 (or $82 in 2020s) according to Charlene Austin.

At the time, Idlewild was at its peak as one of the most popular vacation destinations for African American families, known as "Black Eden". The small community had bustling business scene, with a variety of stores, multiple gas stations, an amusement park, and a roller skating rink.

Among the prominent figures who stayed at Hotel Casa Bonita are writers such as Charles Waddell Chesnutt and W.E.B. Du Bois, as well as musicians like Louis Armstrong, Count Basie, Aretha Franklin, Jackie Wilson, and Della Reese. Idlewild was the home of Daniel Hale Williams, who performed the first successful heart transplant.

=== Decline and closure ===
After the decline of segregation and the Civil Rights Act of 1964, tourism to the area decreased. The building was used as a day care until the 1990s, and then remained vacant for the decades.

In 1979, the hotel was designated as part of the historical district of Idlewild by the and the National Register for its significance during the Civil Rights era. In 2024, the National Park Service named it an African American Civil Rights Network location.

== Legacy and restoration ==
Three local women who worked in the education sector, Charlene Austin, Ida Short, and Betti Wiggins, founded a nonprofit organization called 1st Neighbor to revive the hotel and preserve its history. The goal of 1st Neighbor is to rehabilitate Hotel Casa Bonita into a bed and breakfast again, with a museum area displaying Idlewild's cultural heritage, meeting spaces, services for veterans, and a boutique. Before 1st Neighbor bought Hotel Casa Bonita from its previous owner, the building had been sitting vacant for almost 40 years, and it requires extensive restoration. Asbestos was recently removed and electricity restored.

In 2021, a contractor began major restoration that involved stabilizing the structure, replacing beams and joints, patching leaks in the roof, and installing new flooring.

The National Trust provided a grant through its African American Cultural Heritage Action Fund, and other sources have offered seed funding, but the co-founders of 1st Neighbor said they needed an additional $5 million to bring the hotel back to its former glory, which would cost an estimated $6.3 million. Community members funded some of the work with their own money, but Austin has publicly solicited additional contributions.
