= Leon Bates =

Leon Bates may refer to:

- Leon Bates (pianist) (1949–2025), American concert pianist
- Leon Bates (labor leader) (1899–1972), African American union organizer
