= Lottie 'The Body' Graves Claiborne =

American burlesque dancer (1930–2020)

Lottie "The Body" Tatum-Graves-Claiborne (October 31, 1930 - February 28, 2020) was an American burlesque dancer who performed from the late 1940s to the early 1980s. She was given the nickname "Lottie the Body" when she was a teenager working in modeling. She also became known as the "Black Gypsy Rose Lee" and the "Gypsy Rose Lee of Detroit." Born and raised in New York, her career in burlesque began in San Francisco, and later she moved to Detroit. Lottie was renowned for her support of other exotic dancers, musicians, and entertainers. During her lengthy career, she worked throughout the U.S. and in numerous other countries, performing with many of the great singers, comedians, musicians, and dancers of her era.

== Overview ==
Lottie Tatum Graves Claiborne (née Bristow) was born in Syracuse, New York, on October 31, 1930. She grew up enjoying participating in sports like baseball and basketball, and loved studying ballet as a girl. By age seventeen, she quit school to become a professional dancer. Her first professional job was performing with Whitey's Lindy Hoppers, Herbert White's popular dance troupe in the 1940s that traveled to venues around the country. Famous for the "Lindy Hop," the routines were a combination of jazz, tap, swing, and more. She was also working as a model. At that time in her life, she did not foresee a career as an exotic dancer. But, once the Lindy Hop craze died, she quickly learned that other types of professional jobs in the field of dance were few and far between for an African American woman. It was then that she honed her skills as a burlesque performer. Thus began a long career that took Lottie around the world and introduced her to a life that she'd never imagined.

In the late 1940s, Lottie married an Air Force lieutenant and moved with him when he was stationed in the San Francisco Bay Area. She created her burlesque act there during the height of the popularity of jazz clubs. She and her husband divorced; then she met and married Harlem Globetrotter Goose Tatum at the Champagne Supper Club. After her marriage to Tatum ended, Lottie moved to Detroit by 1960. There she lived for many years with Robert Graves. When he died, she met and married Willie Claiborne, and they enjoyed a long marriage until her death.

== Career ==
When Lottie lived and performed in San Francisco in the late 1940s and early 1950s, she also traveled the country to work. She became a popular performer in Arthur Bragg's Idlewild Review at the Paradise Club in Idlewild, a resort town dubbed the "Black Eden of Michigan." There she was known as the "Black Gypsy Rose Lee." She eventually made Detroit, Michigan, her home base.

Throughout her career, her strip show used Afro-Cuban music and choreography, and she wore elaborate costumes. Her routine included removing clothing, but not nudity. At times she removed no clothing at all, but enchanted her audiences with her performances in either case. Her technique made her enormously popular, and she was in high demand in venues around the country and in other countries. A racketeer in Indianapolis even built a nightclub for her, called the Pink Poodle.

Lottie worked alongside many performers - comedians, singers, musicians, and dancers - who were popular in that era, including Redd Foxx; T-Bone Walker; Della Reese; Billie Holiday; Sammy Davis Jr.; Aretha Franklin; Miles Davis; Sam Cooke; Bessie Smith; B.B. King; Louie Armstrong; Martha Reeves; the Four Tops; the Rhythm Kings; Sarah Vaughn; Cab Calloway; Dinah Washington; Fats Waller; Totie Fields; a number of Motown groups; and others.

Supporting and mentoring other performers, especially dancers, was important to Lottie. Christine Jorgensen, a nightclub entertainer who was the first well-known transsexual in the US, became one of her best friends. Lottie felt strongly about supporting others regardless of sexual orientation. She also met many famous people who were not in the entertainment business, like politicians and government leaders. While traveling with the Harlem Globetrotters to Cuba before Communism in that country, they met Fidel Castro. She found him to be "a sweet little man," having no idea he would become a Communist revolutionary.

Early in her career, when she was married to Tatum, she often served as an unpaid MC for the Globetrotters. By the time she was in her fifties, she danced less and worked as an MC more, at Detroit night clubs. Her effervescent personality made her popular with club audiences. She retired at age 61. When she needed a walker late in her life, she laughed and said it was because she'd done the splits one too many times.

== Civil Rights Movement ==
Lottie believed that she lived her "own sort of Civil Rights Movement", making friends and connections in her own way everywhere she went. However, at times she was treated like a second-class citizen because she was black. Those times were surprisingly rare, she said, especially considering that African Americans were not always welcome while the U.S.A. was mired in an era of inequality and bias. The Civil Rights Movement, with African Americans campaigning for equality, lasted throughout the 1950s and 1960s. During that time of protest and struggle, Lottie felt that she was treated respectfully most of the time, by black and white people, men and women. She recalled with fondness being the first black woman to dance on television in Alaska, where she was treated like "a queen." The wives of political leaders in other countries would take her shopping, and she was invited to be a guest in the Dodge family (the car people) summer home in Michigan. Although she experienced some of the bigotry many African Americans experienced, like occasionally not being allowed in the front door of a club and having deplorable sleeping quarters, for the most part she felt that her career afforded her some privileges that not all black people experienced. Fame had its advantages. She had worked long and hard to build that career, and conducted herself in a way that demonstrated that she knew she deserved to be respected for her efforts. She expected nothing less, but did not let it stop her when she did not get it.

== Personal life ==
Lottie was married and divorced twice, to the lieutenant and to Goose Tatum; then had a long-term relationship with businessman Robert Graves until his death; and then married a third time to Willie Claiborne, which lasted until her death. She divorced Tatum when he fathered a child by another woman, during the time that they were together. She said she lost not only a husband but a "good friend." Then she lived with Detroit businessman Graves for many years, although they never officially married. They separated briefly, something she said saddened her but she understood seeing that she traveled so much for work. But they came back together when she retired at age sixty-one. She forgave him for leaving because, she said, she loved him. Unfortunately, he died in her arms on the day of his return. He had suffered a heart attack. She then met and married Claiborne, and they were together until her death in 2020. Lottie and Willie considered each other to be "soulmates" and shared a loving twenty-five-year relationship.

Although never having children of her own, Lottie held close relationships with many of the younger people she supported and mentored. She was a lifelong sports fan, especially for Detroit teams. She also championed preserving the history of Detroit and supported the Detroit Sound Conservancy.

Lottie was a devout Roman Catholic. She belonged to Our Lady Queen of Heaven - Good Shepard Catholic Community in Detroit, regularly attending mass throughout her life.

== Resources, honors, and awards ==
Watch consummate performer Lottie the Body at age 88 as she shares stories about performing, for the Secret Society of Twisted Storytellers. Also, see Lottie in a 2020 PBS video as she visits the Brass Rail in Detroit, where she often performed.

Lottie appears in the 2002 documentary, Standing in the Shadows of Motown. In 2006, she was a guest of honor at the 16th Annual Miss Exotic World Pageant. She is included in the Detroit Performs exhibit at the Charles H. Wright Museum of African American History, and was honored by them in a ceremony at the Detroit Orchestra Hall in 2013. In 2015, Lottie wrote about her life in the collection of women's stories, What We Talk about When We’re Over 60, with Linda Hughes and Sherri Daley. The Burlesque Hall of Fame in Las Vegas named her their Living Legend of 2017, and their museum has a display that includes one of her show gowns. The book Harlem of the West: The San Francisco Jazz Era, updated in 2020, by Elizabeth Pepin Silva and Lewis Watts, includes an interview with Lottie.

== Words of wisdom ==
In her chapter for What We Talk about When We're Over 60, Lottie chronicled highlights of her personal and professional experiences, including overcoming racial barriers in order to pursue her passion for dancing. Her goal was always "sharing whatever gifts I have to make people happy." She wrote, "If I were to give advice to a young woman today, it would be to live your dreams, just like I did. If I could make it in a time when there was everything going against me - a teenaged African-American female in a highly competitive profession during racist times - you can do whatever it is you desire to do, too. Just remember me, Lottie the Body. If I could do it, you can, too."

== Death ==
Lottie Graves-Claiborne died in Detroit on February 28, 2020, at the age of 89. Not long before her death, she reminisced about having lived a full life with no regrets. "To all you women... I pray that you may have the same kind of love and happiness that I enjoy. I send my love and God's blessings to you all."
