= Booker T. Washington High School (El Dorado, Arkansas) =

Defunct Black school in Arkansas, United States

Location
- 33.20635°N 92.64748°W

Information
- Established: 1908
- Closed: 1987

Booker T. Washington High School was a black high school in El Dorado, Arkansas.

== History ==
Schools for Black children were established by 1897. Booker T. Washington High School was established in 1908. In 1949 the school moved to a new building at the intersection of Hillsboro and Quaker Streets, while the old school was repurposed as Carver Grammar School.

After the public schools integrated, the school was closed. The class of 1969 was the last graduating class before integration; the school closed in 1987. The yearbook was originally named the "Bulletin", but later was renamed the "Hornet".

After integration, the school was converted to a middle school.

== Notable people ==
- Goose Tatum professional baseball and basketball player; performed 11 years with the Harlem Globetrotters.

== See also ==
- List of things named after Booker T. Washington
