= Race and sports in the United States =

Discussions of race and sports in the United States, where the two subjects have always been intertwined in American history, have focused to a great extent on African Americans. Depending on the type of sport and performance level, African Americans are reported to be over- or under-represented. African Americans compose the highest percentage of the minority groups active at the professional level, but are among those who show the lowest participation overall. And though the list of African Americans in professional sports remains high, it only represents a small fraction of aspiring black athletes. The Journal of African American History's (JAAH) Special Issue on African American participation in sports in the 19th and 20th centuries demonstrates that African Americans have often used sports to challenge the social subjugation of their communities and stigma of the society.

== Overview ==
In 2013, while 2.8% of full-time degree-pursuing undergraduates were black men, the group comprised 57% of college football teams, and 64% of men's basketball players, according to Shaun R. Harper. While blacks predominate in football and basketball, whites predominate in many other regulated sports.

In the words of William Ellerbee, basketball coach at national powerhouse Simon Gratz High School in Philadelphia, "Suburban kids tend to play for the fun of it. Inner city kids look at basketball as a matter of life and death" (Price, 1997a). Thus, one might speculate that black inner city kids, whose stature in their community is defined by their physical prowess (Hoberman, 1997) start earlier in life, practice more hours, experience greater activity specific developmental changes, and possess greater self-efficacy in sports such as basketball, football and track than white youth. On the other hand, suburban white children view sport involvement more as an adjunct to other activities in which they engage than one of life's central themes. Because of economic advantages and social reinforcement, these kids are directed into many different sorts of sport related and non-related activities, rather than into just a few team sports. Despite such evidence, pseudo-scientific conceptions of race continue to play a role in the way many in the United States understand African-American contributions to sports.

For all races and sports, from 3.3% (basketball) to 11.3% (ice hockey) are successful in making the transition from high school varsity to an NCAA team. From .8% (men's ice hockey) to 9.4% (baseball) successfully transition from NCAA to professional teams. Therefore, the overall success rate of high school athletes progressing to professional athletes was from .03% (men and women's basketball) to .5% (baseball). The annual number of NCAA athletes drafted into professional sports annually varied from seven (men's ice hockey) to 678 (baseball).

Athletics have been increasingly subsidized by tuition. Only one in eight of the 202 Division I colleges actually netted more money than they spent on athletics between the years 2005 and 2010. At the few money making schools, football and sometimes basketball sales support the school's other athletic programs. The amount spent on an athlete in one of the six highest-profile football conferences, on average, is six times more than the amount spent to educate the non-athlete. Spending per student varied from $10,012 to $19,225; cost per athlete varied from $41,796 to $163,930.

== By race ==
Various individuals, including scholars and sportswriters, have commented on the apparent over-representations and under-representations of different races in different sports. In 2019, African Americans accounted for 74.8% of players in the National Basketball Association (NBA) and 58.9% of players in the National Football League (NFL). However, in 2008, about 8.5% of Major League Baseball players were African American (who make up about 13% of the US population), and 29.1% were Hispanics of any race (compared with about 16% of the US population). In 2020, less than 5% of the National Hockey League (NHL) players are black or of mixed black heritage.

NCAA sports have mirrored the trends present in American professional sports. During the 2005–2006 season, black males comprised 46.9 percent of NCAA Football Bowl Subdivision (FBS) and 58.9 percent of NCAA Division I basketball. The NCAA statistics show a strong correlation between percentage of black athletes within a sport and the revenue generated by that sport.

Despite the frequency of such speculation, suggestions of biological differences in athletic ability between racial groups are considered unscientific.

=== "Black athletic superiority" ===
"Black athletic superiority" is the theory that black people possess certain traits that are acquired through genetic and/or environmental factors that allow them to excel over other races in athletic competition. Whites are more likely to hold these views; however, some blacks and other racial groups do as well.

Various hypotheses regarding racial differences of black and white people and their possible effect on sports performance have been put forth since the later part of the nineteenth century by professionals in many various fields. In the United States, attention to the subject faded over the first two decades of the twentieth century as black athletes were eliminated from white organized sport and segregated to compete among themselves on their own amateur and professional teams. Interest in the subject was renewed after the 1932 Summer Olympics in Los Angeles and Jesse Owens's record-breaking performances at the 1935 Big Ten Track Championships. In 1971, African-American sociologist Harry Edwards wrote: "The myth of the black male's racially determined, inherent physical and athletic superiority over the white male, rivals the myth of black sexual superiority in antiquity."

=== "East Asian athletic views" ===
In the United States, East Asians are stereotyped as being physically and athletically inferior to other races. This has led to much discrimination in the recruitment process of professional American sports, which contributes to Asian American athletes being highly underrepresented in the majority of professional sports teams (a fact that has been noted by many sources). Professional basketball player Jeremy Lin believed that one of the reasons why he was not drafted by an NBA team was his race. This belief has been reiterated by sports writer Sean Gregory of Time magazine and NBA commissioner David Stern. In 2012, despite making up 6% of nation's population Asian American athletes only represented 2% of the NFL, 1.9% of MLB and less than 1% of the NBA and NHL. Brandon Yip was the only player of Chinese descent playing professional hockey in the NHL in 2011. Basketball is a sport that noted for the fact that it has one of the lowest numbers of Asian athletes. This is despite the fact that the sport's color barrier was broken by Wataru Misaka in 1947, an Asian American athlete who was the first American racial minority to play in the NBA.

In American sports, there has been a higher representation of Asian American athletes who are of mixed racial heritage in comparison to those of full racial heritage such as former football player Roman Gabriel who was the first Asian-American to start as an NFL quarterback. Another fact to note is that a majority of Asian American athletes who are currently drafted/recruited to compete professionally tend to be in sports that require little to no contact.

== Discrimination ==
The baseball color line, which included separate Negro league baseball, was one example of racial segregation in the United States.

In the United States, a study found that a form of racial discrimination exists in NBA basketball, as white players received higher salaries than do blacks related to actual performance. Funk says this may be due to viewer discrimination. Viewership increases when there is greater participation by white players, which means higher advertising incomes. This explains much of the salary gap.

Researchers have looked at other evidence for sports consumer discrimination. One method is comparing the price of sports memorabilia, such as baseball cards. Another is looking at fan voting for all-star teams. Still another is looking at willingness to attend sporting events. The evidence is mixed, with some studies finding bias against blacks and others not. A bias, if it exists, may be diminishing and possibly disappearing, according to a study on fan voting for baseball all-star teams.

=== National Basketball Association ===
Although Japanese-American Wataru Misaka broke the National Basketball Association's color barrier in the 1947–48 season when he played for the New York Knicks, 1950 is recognized as the year the NBA integrated. That year African-American players joined several teams; they included Chuck Cooper with the Boston Celtics, Nat "Sweetwater" Clifton with the New York Knicks, and Earl Lloyd with the Washington Bullets.

=== National Hockey League ===
On November 16, 1926, Native American Taffy Abel joined the New York Rangers, breaking the NHL color barrier and making history as the first ever Native American to play in the National Hockey League since its founding in 1917. On January 18, 1958, Willie O'Ree joined the Boston Bruins in a game against the Montreal Canadiens, making history as the first ever black person to play in the National Hockey League. Some 16 years later, Mike Marson became the second black player to join the league with his expansion to the Washington Capitals. Decades later, a 2020 analysis revealed that people of color still comprise less than 5% of players in the National Hockey League and that out of 377 head coaches hired over 102 years, only one has been black.

Though black people are evidently under-represented in the National Hockey League, this is not at all reflective of their involvement in the sport and its development. In 1895–22 years before the establishment of the National Hockey League—the Colored Hockey League took form in Nova Scotia, Canada. This was hockey's first ever organized league, and at its peak contained hundreds of players throughout more than a dozen teams. Political and racial tensions forced the league to disintegrate in 1905 as they were no longer allowed to use arenas at all, regardless of the time of year. In 1921, the league re-formed on a smaller scale with just three teams, but by the mid-1930s, the National Hockey League had become hugely popular while the Colored Hockey League had disappeared altogether.

=== Professional Golfers' Association ===
Throughout the game's history, golf has not included many African-American players, and they were often denied the opportunity to golf. However, many found a way to play the game anyway. According to an article by the African-American Registry titled African-Americans and Golf, a Brief History, "the Professional Golf Association of America (PGA) fought hard [...] and successfully maintained its all-white status. Black golfers (then) created their own organization of touring professionals." In 1961, the "Caucasians only" clause was struck from the Professional Golfers' Association of America constitution.

Tiger Woods has had a major impact on the game of golf, especially among minorities. The article, African-Americans and Golf, a Brief History, states "With the ascent of Tiger Woods and his golf game comes an increased interest and participation from young minorities in the game. He himself envisions this impacting in the next ten years as they come of age and develop physically as well." Woods hopes minority participation will continue to increase in the future.

The research surrounding descriptions employed about White and Black athletes in the media and how the stereotypes of Black athletes has affected Tiger Woods in a majority white sport, because Tiger Woods was the only Black golfer on the PGA tour, he received different comments related to Black stereotypes that the other golfers on the tour did not.

African American participation in golf has been increasing, with data from a 1997 study suggesting there were 676,000 African-American golfers (2.7% of the 24.7 million golfers).

As African-American participation increased, Asian participation in professional golf has also increased. According to an article by Golfweek titled Record Number of Asian Golfers Compete for Masters Glory, there were 10 golfers which was a tournament record.

According to the article Where are all the black golfers? Nearly two decades after Tiger Woods' arrival, golf still struggles to attract minorities, As of 2013 there were 25.7 million golfers: this was composed of 20.3 million whites, 3.1 million Hispanics, 1.3 million African-Americans, and 1 million Asian-Americans. The lack of diversity is still very apparent in golf today.

=== Positions of power: coaching and administration ===
Referring to quarterbacks, head coaches, and athletic directors, Kenneth L. Shropshire of the Wharton School of the University of Pennsylvania has described the number of African Americans in "positions of power" as "woefully low". In 2000, 78% of players in the NBA were Black, but only 33% of NBA officials were minorities. The lack of minorities in positions of leadership has been attributed to racial stereotypes as well "old boy networks" and white administrators networking within their own race. In 2003, the NFL implemented the Rooney Rule, requiring teams searching for a new head coach to interview at least one minority candidate.

With an inadequate number of minorities in executive positions in the NFL, the NFL decided to revise the Rooney Rule to include teams to interview minorities for general manager positions. There has been backlash on how effective this rule has been and if there needs to be more revisions to this rule. As of 2022, there are only six minority head coaches in the NFL: Lovie Smith, Mike Tomlin, Ron Rivera, Robert Saleh, Todd Bowles, and Mike McDaniel. Because of racial discrimination, which AAP News & Journal defines as, "a form of social inequality that includes experiences resulting from legal and nonlegal systems of discrimination", it has resulted in unequal outcomes and a power struggle. A vast majority of the representation of minority coaches are held at positional or assistant coaches. With a lot of people [minorities] competing for head coaching positions with only a limited supply, it allows the very few minority head coaches to get handsomely salaries while the rest get average or low pay. Not only are finances an issue, the talent that is being presented is ultimately looked over because minorities coaches are not being hired and the NFL is meeting their status quo, of at least interviewing minorities for head coaching and general manager positions. Social networks also play a big role in how coaches are hired.

The power dynamics between the owners and players in the NFL has created racial inequality between the two groups. 30 owners are white while only two owners are of color (one is from Pakistan and one is Asian American). Richard Roth, sports attorney who has represented Peyton Manning, claimed, "22 of the teams in the NFL have been owned by the same person or family for at least 20 years". Dr. Richard Lapchick, director of the Institute for Diversity and Ethics in Sports, claimed, "Who owners invite into their fraternity-and its overwhelmingly a fraternity-is self-selective". Owners of teams must be very wealthy as teams "Cost upwards of $1B". Due to wealth inequality in the United States, there are few black billionaires who could be potential candidates. Furthermore, from a social class standpoint, it is very difficult for there to be a black owner as "very few black people are part of these billionaires' boys' clubs".

Many of the racial problems shown in sports are present because of the lack of diversity in ownership. The predominant presence of white male owners in sports drives a wedge between members of the organization. The narrative portrayed by ownership in sports paints the same picture of slave and owner from 400 years ago. NBA player Draymond Green ignited debates on the relationship between team ownership and players. In 2017, Green stated that the NBA should really consider the term "owner" and its usage dating back to chattel slavery, considering the majority of NBA players are black and nearly all team ownership is white. This has been a fact virtually the entire history of sports organizations. In 1994, Black people accounted for 80% of the NFL players, 65% of the NBA players, and 18% of the MLB players, but less than 10% of team ownership. 25 years later, the percentage of black athletes and team owners has not changed much with Black people accounting for 70% of the NFL players, 81% of the NBA players, and 8% of the MLB players. Team ownership is still below 10%. However, one thing that changed with time is the term for ownership in the NBA: NBA commissioner Adam Silver declared in June 2019 that the organization will no longer use the term "owner" and will now refer to owners as governors and partial owners as alternate governors.

Aside from a lack of black owners, owners make hundreds of times what the players make. This is similar to the NFL disparity between owners and the players. According to a report by the Green Bay Packers, the NFL earned $7,808,000 from TV deals, and split it among its 32 teams evenly. This means that each NFL owner "made $244m last year in 2016". By contrast, the "average NFL player made $2.1m in 2015". The owners of these teams are making hundreds of times what the players are. This is similar to the difference in pay between CEOs and average workers of corporations. Professor Pfeffer, a social inequality professor at the University of Michigan, claimed, "CEOs make more than 350 times what the average worker makes". The work of the owners is not hundreds of times more valuable than that of the players. However, it is the power dynamics and politics of the league structure that allow owners to make so much more.

Similar to the discrepancy between participation and leadership of blacks in American professional sports leagues, NCAA sports also have had a low percentage of administrators and coaches relative to the number of athletes. For example, during the 2005–2006 academic year, high revenue NCAA sports (basketball and football) had 51 percent black student athletes, whereas only 17 percent of head coaches in the same high revenue sports were black Also, in the same 2005–2006 year, only 5.5 percent of athletic directors at Division I "PWIs" (Primarily White Institutions), were black. Terry Bowden, a notable white Division I football coach, suggests that the reason many university presidents will not hire black coaches is "because they are worried about how alumni and donors will react." Bowden also refers to the "untapped talent" existing within the ranks of assistant coaches in Division I football. The data backs up this claim, with 26.9 percent of Division I assistant coaches during the 2005-06 year in men's revenue sports being black, a notably higher percentage than of head coaches. In terms of administrative positions, they have been concentrated largely in the hands of whites. As recently as 2009, 92.5 percent of university presidents in the FBS were white, 87.5 percent of athletic directors were white, and 100 percent of the conference commissioners were white. Despite these statistics, black head coaches have become more prevalent at the FBS level. As of 2012, there are now 15 black head coaches in FBS football, including now 3 in the SEC, a conference that did not hire its first black head coach until 2003.

=== Mascot controversies ===
The use of Native American names and imagery for sport mascots or in franchise memorabilia is an issue of ongoing discussion and controversy in American sports, as some Native American representatives have objected to such use without explicit negotiation and permission.

==== Washington Redskins ====
In July 2020, due to mounting pressure from FedEx, who owned the naming rights of their stadium and dozens of shareholders, the Washington Redskins changed their team name to the Washington Football Team. The name was considered racist by many Native American groups. In 2022, they rebranded as the Washington Commanders.

=== Controversy within The Atlanta Hawks ===
The Atlanta Hawks has had multiple cases where racial discrimination has become an issue with the organization. In 2012, Bruce Levenson, majority ownership holder in the Atlanta Hawks NBA franchise, gave an evaluation in an email to other administrators on the progress of the Atlanta Hawks game operations. In the email, Levenson stated that originally game operations were not a concern but that they had become so due to the lack of a season ticket base caused by the demographics of attendance at games and of those involved with game operations. Levenson claims he was told that if white males from 35–55 years of age and corporations were not the target of all aspects of game operations, season tickets would not sell. When pressed for answers no one would give Levenson any further assistance in understanding the issue. It was then that he noticed 70% black attendance at games, black cheerleaders at the games, that the music was hip-hop, that customers at the arena bars were 90% black, that there were few fathers and sons in attendance, and that the concerts after games were either hip-hop or gospel.

Despite the fact that the email had been sent to staff in 2012, it was not revealed until the investigation of a second incident that included racist remarks in regard to Luol Deng (a British NBA player born in what is now South Sudan). In 2014 Danny Ferry was the President of the Atlanta Hawks franchise. In a scouting report on Luol Deng he stated that Deng displayed good traits on the outside "but despite seeming to be a good person he's an African". Ferry went on to compare Deng to "an African store front that looks great, but there's a black market section in the back".

These problematic statements by both Danny Ferry and Bruce Levenson became the driving force behind the sale of the Atlanta Hawks. The Atlanta Hawks would be purchased for approximately $730 – 850 million by Tony Ressler. Due to being overshadowed by a racial incident between Donald Sterling and the Los Angeles Clippers, the Hawks organization received little publicity.

=== Promoting racial harmony and breaking stereotypes ===
Racial differences in the NFL are also evident between player positions. According to an Undefeated article, all positions have remained strongly overrepresented by African American players in the period between 1999 and 2014, with African Americans outnumbering white Americans in several positions. However, this effect has been less pronounced for the center and quarterback positions: in 1999, the percentage of white players in the center position was 75% compared to 20% for African Americans, while the percentage of white players in the quarterback position was 81% compared to 18% for African American; though white Americans outnumbered African Americans in these positions, the percentages nonetheless showed significant overrepresentation of African Americans (~13% of the total population of the US) among both center and quarterback players compared to white Americans (~82% of the total population).

According to William Jeynes, a professor of education at California State University, Long Beach, the gathering at the first Thanksgiving in the United States was an attempt to create racial harmony through games and sporting contests that included running, shooting and wrestling. Huping Ling, a professor of history at Truman State University, has asserted that the participation of Chinese students in sports helped break local stereotypes in the St. Louis area during the 1920s. This history of racial tension in the competition between whites and minority groups shows an attempt to prove the humanity, equality, and even occasionally their superiority on the playing field. By doing so, groups of minorities hoped that sports would serve as a source for racial pride that would eventually lead to upward social mobility. However, as early as 1984, criticism has been levied against these ideas. Sports sociologist Harry Edwards openly criticized African Americans as being "co-conspirators" in their own children's exploitation by the white dominated sports establishment. Edwards asserted that stereotypes such as the "dumb jocks" were not born but rather socially created and fuelled by low expectations, their communities, and educational institutions that overly encourage athletic persists. Despite the perception of a white dominated sports establishment, research has shown that there is greater emphasis on sports as a potential career path in the African American community compared to the White community. Edwards continued by arguing that placing so much emphasis on sports achievement as a way for minority groups, specifically referring to African Americans, to achieve some level of prominence is de-emphasizing the importance of intellectual pursuits. John Hoberman, in Darwin's Athletes: How Sport Has Damaged Black America and Preserved the Myth of Race, suggest that this fixation on the importance of athletic ability in the African American community has steered many youth away from more realistic occupational pursuits. He suggests that this idea is further reinforcing the concept of innate black athletic superiority. Despite the conflicting perceptions of sports as a harmonizing instrument, many researchers still believe that not much has changed to alleviate the racially tense landscape many believe to be inherent in current day society.

== Activism ==
Racial activism has been found in many of professional sports leagues such as the National Basketball Association and the National Football League.

=== National Basketball Association ===
Following the emergence of the Trayvon Martin case, NBA players including LeBron James, Dwyane Wade, Chris Bosh, and other Miami Heat players at the time posed for a picture in hoodies, the outfit that Trayvon Martin was wearing when killed. In December 2014, LeBron James and other Cleveland Cavaliers including Kyrie Irving wore black t-shirts featuring the quote "I CANT BREATHE" following the death of Eric Garner who was put in a choke hold by a New York police officer. Since then, LeBron James has been in public disputes Via Twitter and Instagram, and turned the slogan of his critics, "Shut up and dribble", into the Title of his Showtime Series that aired in October 2018. The show focuses on athletes who are shifting the narrative of what it means to be a black athlete in the sense that nowadays more and more athletes are speaking up on political and racial topics going on in the United States.

=== National Football League ===
In a 2016 pre-season game against the San Diego Chargers, Colin Kaepernick, a quarterback for the San Francisco 49ers, chose to kneel instead of standing in solidarity with his teammates for the National Anthem. He did this to raise awareness for victims of police brutality and oppression of minorities in America. Many people believe Kaepernick is a hero for raising awareness for important social issues. However, his actions caused a massive backlash by fans and the media who decried him for acting anti American and disrespecting American troops. Furthermore, players from other teams began to kneel instead of stand with the national anthem. When questioned by the media, he claimed, "I am not going to stand up to show pride in a flag for a country that oppresses black people and people of color." According to NFL policy, "There is no rule saying players must stand during the national anthem".

Kaepernick's act inspired many other players to also kneel during the national anthem. Bob McNair, owner of the Houston Texans, claimed, "They can't have the inmates running the prison" during a meeting with owners and no current players. Many players took to social media to protest the racist rhetoric of Bob McNair.

Kaepernick claimed to be blackballed by all 32 teams following being released for his on the field protest in support of the Black Lives Matter movement. Ads following his release have focused on a simple tagline "Believe in something. Even if it means sacrificing everything." In 2019, Hip Hop artist and businessman Jay-Z partnered with the NFL in promoting their social justice efforts. As a supporter Kaepernick's efforts to protest police brutality, Jay-Z became an intermediary between the NFL and the black community. With Jay-Z's support, in 2019, Kaepernick and the NFL agreed to hold a workout session to showcase Kaepknick's talents as a competitive Quarterback and potential Super Bowl contender. Kaeperknick remains without a team despite many teams' need for a Quarterback.

== Commentating ==
Racial remarks have been made about athletes of color throughout history. Radio host Don Imus described the Rutgers University women's basketball team as "nappy-headed hos" on his radio program "Imus in the Morning" in 2007. Later on he proclaimed that the match-up between Rutgers and their opponents looked like a showdown of the "jigaboos versus the wannabes."

In 1988 sports commentator Jimmy "the Greek" Snyder proclaimed his theory on why Black Americans are more athletic than White Americans: "The black is a better athlete to begin with because he's been bred to be that way, because of his high thighs and big thighs that goes up into his back, and they can jump higher and run faster because of their bigger thighs and he's bred to be the better athlete because this goes back all the way to the Civil War when during the slave trade … the slave owner would breed his big black to his big woman so that he could have a big black kid …"

Snyder would later express regret for his comments shortly after they aired, telling The Washington Post that "I thought I was being instructive, when in fact, I was destructive".

Snyder was later fired by CBS.

Sherman Maxwell was the first African American sports broadcaster. He began his career in 1929 on WNJ radio. He was known as "the voice of Newark".

== In popular culture ==
=== Cinema ===
While there are discrepancies in "based on a true story" sports movies, the movies are still representing the harsh realities of race and sports well. The US-set films Hoosiers and Rudy have been described as memorializing the "golden age of sports" as a time of white prevalence and dominance, while Glory Road showed a white coach helping to dissolve the color barrier in college basketball.

Another movie that received critical acclaim was 42. This movie was the Jackie Robinson story, a young man who was the first black player in the MLB. This movie focused on the journey Robinson took throughout his first year in the major leagues, going through the ups and downs. There were some moments that critics felt like producers could have given more depth to different characters, but overall the film represented that time in America and sports well.

Some movies about black athletes do not focus completely on the aspect of race. The 2001 movie Ali, a film about great boxer Muhammed Ali, was another story about the journey through his life, but only briefly focused on racial aspects. Most of the film reflected on Ali and his personal journey that had little to do with the color of his skin. In 2022 a film was announced about the 1956 Sugar Bowl, which included the first black player to play in a college bowl game in the deep south.

== See also ==
- Race and ethnicity in the NHL

=== Individuals ===
- Al Campanis controversy
- Howard Cosell controversy
- Marge Schott controversy
- Jimmy Snyder controversy
