= Barnstorming (sports) =

Athletics terminology

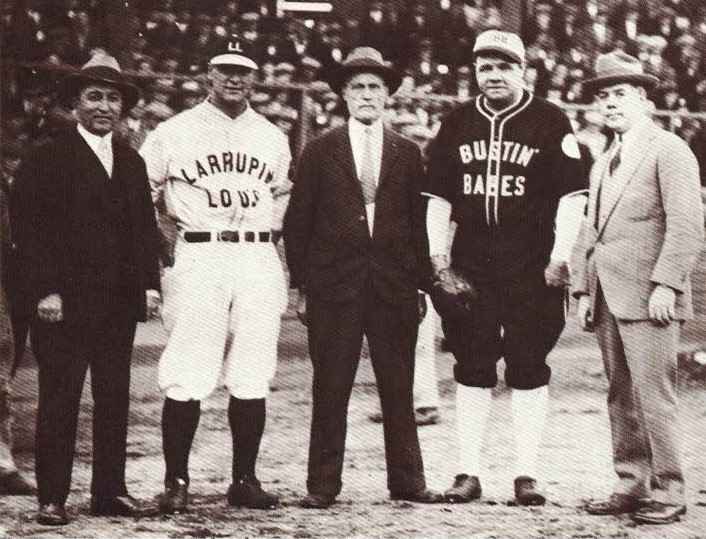
Lou Gehrig and Babe Ruth pose with locals during their barnstorming tour in Kinsley Park, Providence, Rhode Island, October 10, 1927.

In athletics terminology, barnstorming refers to sports teams or individual athletes who travel to various locations, usually small towns, to stage exhibition matches. The term is primarily used in the United States. Barnstorming teams differ from traveling teams in that they operate outside the framework of an established athletic league, while traveling teams are designated by a league, formally or informally, to be a designated visiting team.

Barnstorming allowed athletes to compete in two sports; for example, Reece "Goose" Tatum played basketball for the Harlem Globetrotters and baseball for a Negro leagues barnstorming team. Some barnstorming teams lack home arenas, while others go on "barnstorming tours" in the off-season.

== History ==
Teams in baseball's Negro leagues often barnstormed before, during, and after their league's regular season. Hall of Fame baseball pitcher Satchel Paige barnstorm toured with Dempsey Hovland's Caribbean Kings. Hovland founded (and owned) several barnstorming teams, including the Texas Cowgirls (1949–1977), the first integrated professional women's basketball team to tour worldwide, and the New York Harlem Queens. The Harlem Globetrotters and Texas Cowgirls shared training camps, seasons, and circuits.

Barnstorming is most commonly connected with baseball, with many stars of the Major Leagues doing barnstorming with their own "all-star" teams from the start of the 20th century, all the way to the 1950s, either playing intrasquad games or against local minor league teams. It was a way for players to make extra money during the off-season, and the games were usually played in smaller towns in the south, Midwest, and western United States, where there wasn't major league baseball, and allowed fans the rare opportunity to see their favorite players in person. The popularity of barnstorming faded away in the 1950s as more and more baseball games were televised, affording fans a new way to watch their favorite players and teams.

While barnstorming is no longer as popular as it was in the 20th century, some teams such as basketball's Harlem Globetrotters, and softball's King and His Court, founded by Eddie Feigner, carry on the tradition. In the 1990s, the Colorado Silver Bullets women's baseball team resurrected barnstorming because there was no women's league. In 2023, the Savannah Bananas—up to that point, a collegiate summer baseball team— became a full-time barnstorming team to great success, after their proprietary "Banana Ball" format became a national phenomenon. The Bananas helped revive the popularity of barnstorming baseball.

It was very common in the early days of professional American football; for instance, the Los Angeles Wildcats of the first American Football League (AFL) of 1926 played the regular season as a traveling team, then went on a post-season barnstorming tour of Texas and California, with Red Grange. NFL teams were also known to barnstorm in small towns against local teams all the way up through World War II.

Several auto racers, most notably Barney Oldfield, staged exhibitions around the United States in the early twentieth century. In 1914 he barnstormed against the aviator Lincoln Beachey at least 35 times.

In rugby union, notable invitation-only touring teams include the Barbarians and the French Barbarians.

Regional and local barnstorming circuits are often undertaken by local celebrity squads and retired alumni of professional leagues, such as the Buffalo Sabres Alumni Hockey Team.

== Teams ==
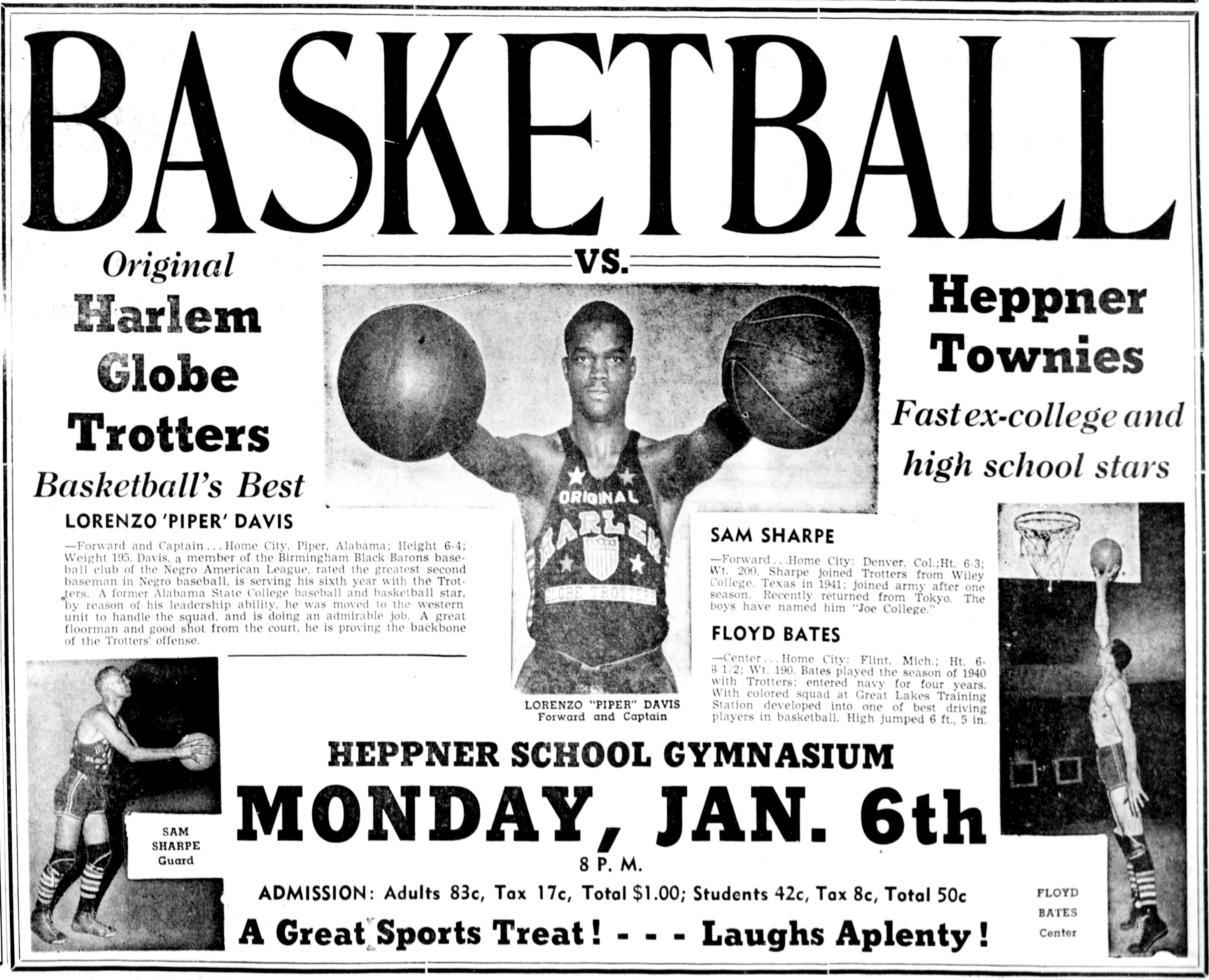
A 1947 newspaper advertisement for a Harlem Globetrotters game against a team of locals in Heppner, Oregon

=== American football ===
- Los Angeles Wildcats
- Red Grange's All-Stars
- Tampa Cardinals

=== Baseball ===
- Alaska Goldpanners of Fairbanks
- Babe Ruth's All-Stars
- Brooklyn Royal Giants
- Caribbean Kings
- Chappie Johnson’s All-Stars
- Chicago Union Giants
- Cosmic Chili Peppers
- Cuban Stars (East)
- Cuban Stars (West)
- Cuban X Giants
- Dizzy Dean's All-Stars
- Gilkerson's Union Giants
- Harlem Globetrotters (baseball team)
- House of David, a baseball team that toured rural United States from the 1920s until the 1950s
- Indianapolis Clowns (original)
- Iowa Colored Cowboys
- Negro National League All-Stars
- Satchel Paige’s All-Stars
- Tennessee Rats
- Zulu Cannibal Giants
- Banana Ball teams:
  - Savannah Bananas
  - Party Animals
  - Firefighters
  - Texas Tailgaters
  - Loco Beach Coconuts
  - Indianapolis Clowns (revival)

=== Basketball ===
- All American Red Heads
- Harlem Globetrotters
- Harlem Wizards
- New York Renaissance (Rens)
- Texas Cowgirls
- Washington Generals
- World Famous Indians

=== Association football (soccer) ===
- Dallas Tornado (1967–1968 world tour)

=== Cricket ===
- Bunbury Cricket Club
- Kaipaki Nation Cricket Club

=== Ice hockey ===
- Buffalo Sabres Alumni Hockey Team
- Boston Bruins Alumni Hockey Team
- Flying Fathers
- Montreal Canadiens Legends
- Sudbury Bulldogs

=== Rugby union ===
- Barbarian F.C.
- French Barbarians

=== Softball ===
- King and His Court

=== Other ===
The Lancaster Barnstormers are a professional baseball team based in Lancaster, Pennsylvania. They are a member of the Freedom Division of the Atlantic League of Professional Baseball, and do not engage in actual barnstorming. Likewise, the Iowa Barnstormers arena football squad was not a literal barnstorming squad, its name instead being a play on Iowa's farming industry.
