= Iowa Colored Cowboys =

Barnstorming softball team in the 1960s

- Sport: Softball
- Founded: 1932–1933
- Folded: 1960s
- Based in: Sioux City, Iowa, US
- Manager: Harry Fisher

The Iowa Colored Cowboys was a barnstorming softball team, consisting mostly of black players, that played during the 1960s. The team was based in Sioux City, Iowa, United States.

== Founding and gameplay ==
The team's original name was the Sioux City Iowa Negro Ghosts which played in 1932 or 1933, and the team was brought back in 1960 under a different name. The original group was one of the first touring softball teams. General manager Harry Fisher came up with the Sioux City Iowa Negro Ghosts when he thought of adding comedy to softball, shadowball after each game, and "top-notch softball at all times". Shadowball was when the team played without a ball. They also played the sport in slow-motion.

As many as over a thousand people gathered to watch performances by the Iowa Colored Cowboys, in an atmosphere similar to a Harlem Globetrotters event. The team had players who were also entertainers, who Fisher said was "a Ball-Circus, America's greatest summer sport show." Several members used to be a part of the original team. Player Marland Buckner, also known as "Showboat", was known for showmanship and "goofy" antics, but for also being one of the team's "greatest defensive first basemen" Marland was known for his jokes, spinning his bat, and embarrassing the umpires. Red Strickland might have been the team's only white player and he was known for his hurling. Other players included "Tree Top" Patrick, Rip Collins, "Popeye" Smith, and L. J. "Compound" Flavors.

== Later years ==
Due to a ban of blacks joining major sports leagues, such teams allowed them to participate and also helped the later desegregation of major league baseball. It is unknown when the team disbanded. In 2007, the State Historical Museum in Des Moines, Iowa, opened an exhibit titled "Shades of Greatness: Art Inspired by Negro Leagues Baseball" that included a booklet about the team.
