= Yates Township, Michigan =

- Civil township
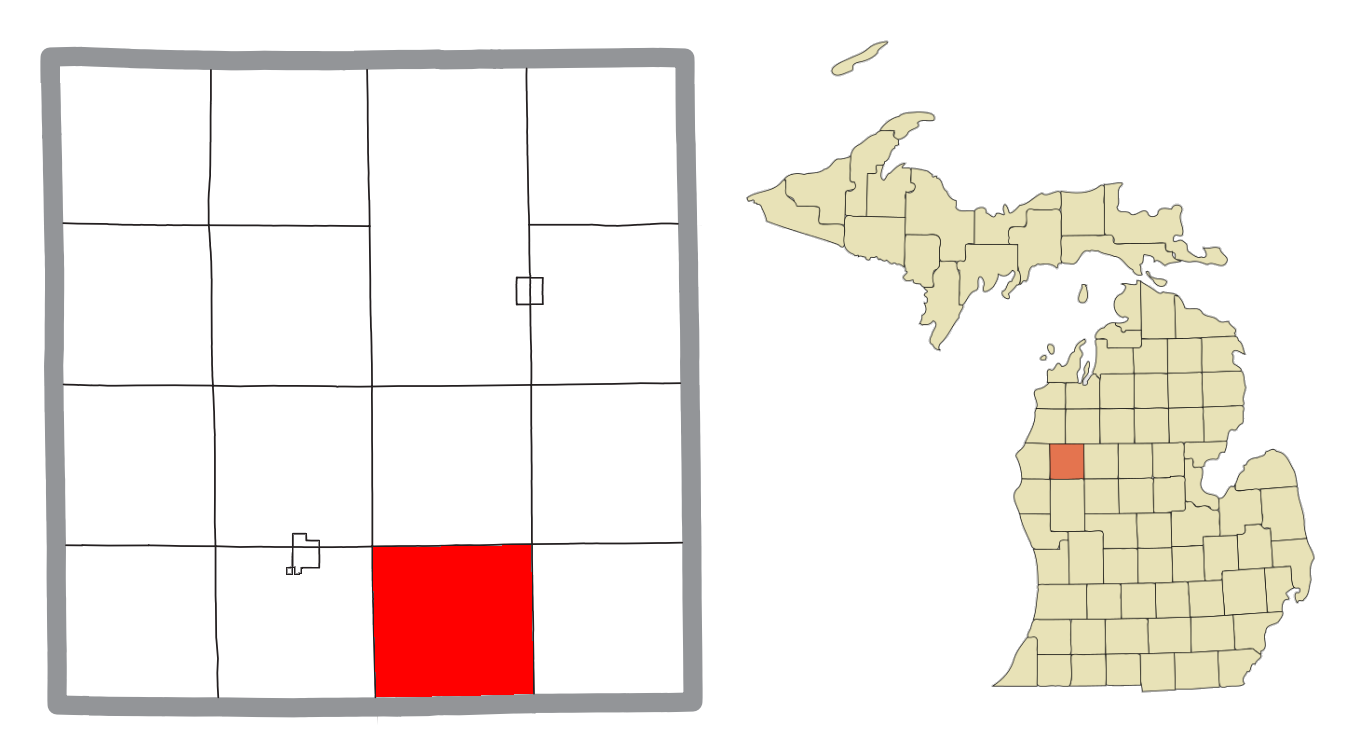
- Location within Lake County

- Location within the state of Michigan Location within the United States
- Coordinates: 43°52′51″N 85°46′59″W
- Country: United States
- State: Michigan
- County: Lake

Area
  - Total: 35.7 sq mi (92.5 km^{2})
  - Land: 35.4 sq mi (91.7 km^{2})
  - Water: 0.31 sq mi (0.8 km^{2})
- Elevation: 994 ft (303 m)

Population (2020)
  - Total: 755
  - Density: 21.3/sq mi (8.23/km^{2})
- Time zone: UTC-5 (Eastern (EST))
  - Summer (DST): UTC-4 (EDT)
- FIPS code: 26-89040
- GNIS feature ID: 1627298
- Website: https://yatestownship.com/

Yates Township is a civil township of Lake County in the U.S. state of Michigan. The population was 755 at the 2020 census.

== Geography ==
According to the United States Census Bureau, the township has a total area of 35.7 square miles (92 km^{2}), of which 35.4 square miles (92 km^{2}) is land and 0.3 square miles (0.78 km^{2}) (0.87%) is water. Communities in the township have included Idlewild, which still exists, and Nirvana, an early lumbering center that has entirely disappeared.

== Demographics ==
As of the census of 2000, there were 714 people, 308 households, and 186 families residing in the township. The population density was 20.2 per square mile (7.8/km^{2}). There were 1,256 housing units at an average density of 35.5 per square mile (13.7/km^{2}). The racial makeup of the township was 51.26% White, 42.02% African American, 1.12% Native American, 0.28% Asian, 0.14% from other races, and 5.18% from two or more races. Hispanic or Latino of any race were 2.52% of the population.

There were 308 households, out of which 24.7% had children under the age of 18 living with them, 40.9% were married couples living together, 15.9% had a female householder with no husband present, and 39.3% were non-families. 31.8% of all households were made up of individuals, and 15.3% had someone living alone who was 65 years of age or older. The average household size was 2.30 and the average family size was 2.86.

In the township the population was spread out, with 26.3% under the age of 18, 7.3% from 18 to 24, 18.2% from 25 to 44, 26.2% from 45 to 64, and 22.0% who were 65 years of age or older. The median age was 43 years. For every 100 females, there were 91.9 males. For every 100 females age 18 and over, there were 90.6 males.

The median income for a household in the township was $20,417, and the median income for a family was $25,179. Males had a median income of $33,438 versus $28,125 for females. The per capita income for the township was $13,570. About 27.7% of families and 30.6% of the population were below the poverty line, including 53.0% of those under age 18 and 10.7% of those age 65 or over.

== Education ==
All of Yates Township is in the Baldwin Community Schools school district.

== See also ==
- Idlewild, Michigan - A community in the township

== See also ==
- Idlewild, Michigan
