= Dempsey Hovland =

American businessman

Dempsey Hovland (December 11, 1918 – 1979) was a baseball and basketball barnstorming entrepreneur and promoter and multiple sports team owner. He founded the 20th Century Booking Agency, a sports booking management for arranging and marketing of sporting exhibition events and booking of venues. He and his wife Florence Holder Hovland owned the Miss American Teenager beauty pageant in the 1960s and 1970s.

Hovland, born in Beloit, Wisconsin, started his sports promotion career as a member and manager of the barnstorming House of David basketball team in the 1930s and 1940s. He was respected as a barnstorm icon being the only sports team owner to operate both professional male and female basketball teams at the same time throughout the United States. He also founded the baseball barnstorm teams Caribbean Kings and Havana Cuban Giants.

Hovland's world-famous barnstorm basketball team Texas CowGirls (1949–1977) (full name Dempsey Hovland's World Famous Texas Cowgirls Basketball Team) originating from Chicago, Illinois touring worldwide in similar fashion to the Harlem Globetrotters, were the first female team to share double billing on the men's National Basketball Association game schedules. Texas Cowgirls also broke ground and opened for the Harlem Globetrotters in the 1950s, on their tours. Hovland dismissed the racial barriers for female barnstormers, integrating his teams. Hovland was an advocate for women and minorities' equal access in sports participation before the Civil Rights Bill during rampant segregation .

The Texas Cowgirls were invited to play American service bases overseas by President John F. Kennedy. The team received an honorary ambassador award from Robert McNamara, United States Secretary of Defense 1961-1968. CBS's Roger Mudd featured the team in 1974.

The colorful sports commentator Heywood Hale Broun travelled with the team, documenting the life of young women living on the road in a profession dominated by males. National Football League were opponents of the Texas CowGirls for three decades in the off season (Minnesota Vikings and Green Bay Packers). The team called quits in 1977, two years before the death of its founder Dempsey Hovland.

The New York Harlem Queens, an African-American female basketball team and yet another Hovland team barnstormed against off-season NFL teams and men's basketball teams like the barnstorming Texas Cowgirls.

Barnstorming basketball was the opportunity for women to play men's rules against men, as opposed to the six-a-side format that still pervaded organized women's basketball at the time. At halftime the females would entertain the crowds with their ball handling expertise. As an international barnstorm promoter, Hovland also carried barnstorm entertainers on the road tours to entertain at halftime. Satchel Paige, a Negro leagues and Major League Hall of Fame baseball pitcher travelled with the Texas Cowgirls providing exhibition pitching during halftime. Eddie Gottlieb was instrumental in securing games for Hovland's female Texas Cowgirls on the National Basketball Association schedules.

== Personal life ==
Hovland married Florence Holder in 1954. She was an All American High school basketball player who joined the Texas CowGirls at seventeen. Her career with the team included sharing courts with Naismith Memorial Basketball Hall of Famers such as Bob Cousy, Ed Macauley, Dolph Schayes, and George Mikan.
