= Eden Township, Minnesota =

Eden Township is the name of multiple townships in the U.S. state of Minnesota:

- Eden Township, Brown County, Minnesota
- Eden Township, Pipestone County, Minnesota
- Eden Township, Polk County, Minnesota

== See also ==
- Eden Township (disambiguation)
