= Ludington Area Schools =

School district in Michigan

Coordinates: 41°45′59″N 83°35′22″W

Address
- 809 E. Tinkham Ave. Ludington, Mason, 49431; United States

District information
- Type: Public
- Grades: Pre-kindergarten through 12
- Superintendent: Dr. Kyle B. Corlett
- Schools: 3
- Budget: US$42,021,000 (2021-22)
- NCES District ID: 2622200

Students and staff
- Students: 2,063 (2023-24)
- Teachers: 117.67 (2023-24)
- Staff: 229.25 (2023-24)
- Student–teacher ratio: 17.53 (2023-24)
- District mascot: Oriole
- Colors: Orange and Black

Other information
- Website: www.lasd.net

Ludington Area Schools is a public school district in Mason County, Michigan. It serves the city of Ludington and the townships of Hamlin and Pere Marquette, and parts of Amber Township, Summit Township, and Riverton Township.

== History ==
The first school in Ludington was established in a shed behind a sawmill in 1865. A dedicated wooden schoolhouse was built in 1867. In 1874, a union school district was established. A high school was built in 1880. It was replaced in 1886 by another building on Foster Street, called Central School. Across Foster Street, Foster School was built in 1905.

Beginning in 1947, several small school districts in outlying rural areas were annexed to Ludington. For example, Summit Township School District No. 3's two-room school was built in 1913 on the southeast corner of Hawley Road and Pere Marquette Highway. It was known as the French School. In 1960, it was replaced by South Summit School on Lattin Road. It was annexed to Ludington Area Schools in 1966 and closed in 2005. The 1960 school and 1913 school buildings are still extant.

The current high school was built in 1953, but it was initially a junior high school until 1957. That year, the junior high school moved to the former high school (Central School) and the 1953 junior high became the high school. In 1965, a new junior high was built. The old Central School became Foster Elementary, and the 1905 Foster Elementary building was torn down around 1967.

The 1886 Central School section of Foster Elementary faced Lavinia Street. An addition was built in 1925 that faced Foster Street. In 1968, the 1886 section of the building was torn down and an addition built in its place. When the new Ludington Elementary opened in 2022, Foster Elementary closed.

== Schools ==
Ludington Area Schools
School	Address	Notes
Ludington Early Childhood Center	5771 W. Bryant, Ludington	Preschool. Shares a building with Ludington Elementary.
Ludington Elementary School	5771 W. Bryant Rd., Ludington	Grades K–5. Built 2022.
OJ DeJonge Middle School	706 E. Tinkham Avenue, Ludington	Grades 6–8. Built 1965.
Ludington High School	707 Anderson St., Ludington	Grades 9–12; Mascot: The Orioles. Built 1953.
