= Eden Township, Michigan =

Eden Township is the name of some places in the U.S. state of Michigan:

- Eden Township, Lake County, Michigan
- Eden Township, Mason County, Michigan

== See also ==
- Eden Township (disambiguation)
