= Fountain, Michigan =

- Village
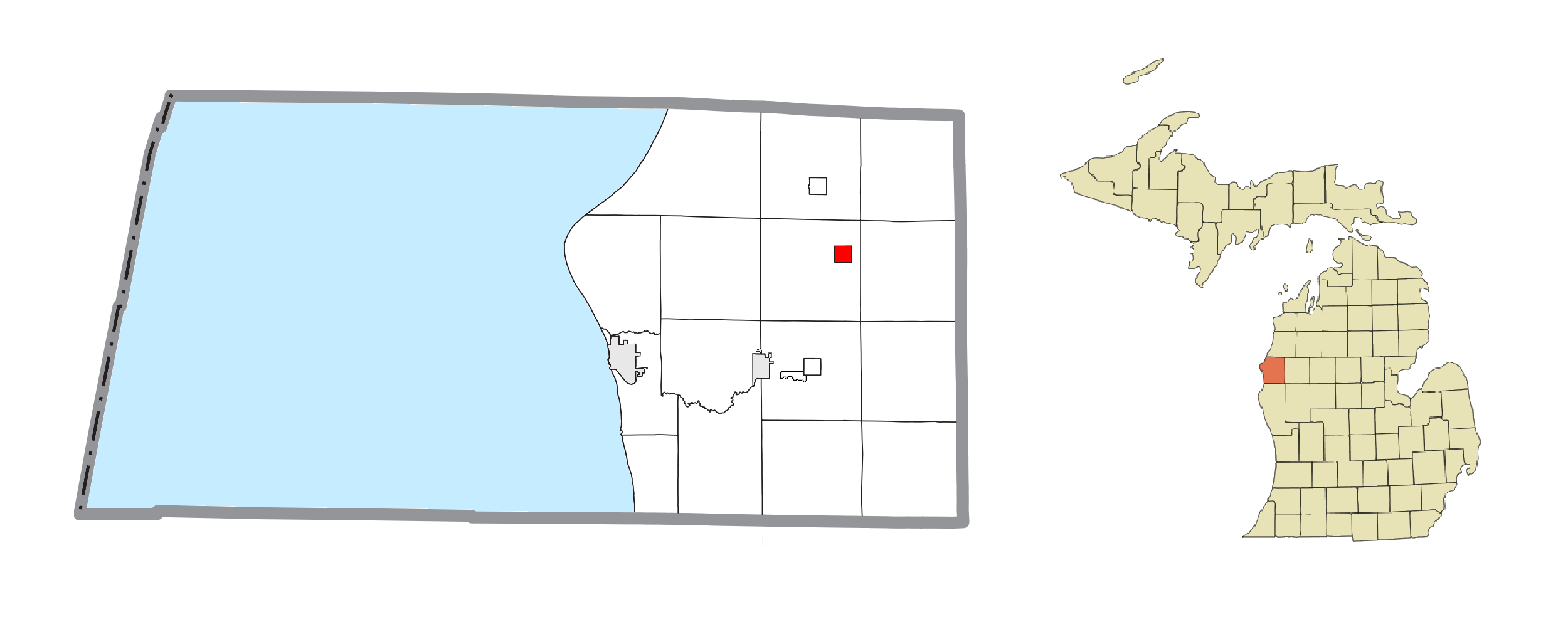
- Location within Mason County

- Location within Michigan Location within the United States
- Coordinates: 44°02′46″N 86°10′46″W
- Country: United States
- State: Michigan
- County: Mason
- Township: Sherman
- Founded: 1882
- Incorporated: 1913

Area
  - Total: 1.03 sq mi (2.66 km^{2})
  - Land: 1.03 sq mi (2.66 km^{2})
  - Water: 0 sq mi (0.00 km^{2})
- Elevation: 709 ft (216 m)

Population (2020)
  - Total: 170
  - Density: 165.8/sq mi (64.02/km^{2})
- Time zone: UTC-5 (Eastern (EST))
  - Summer (DST): UTC-4 (EDT)
- ZIP Code: 49410
- Area code: 231
- FIPS code: 26-29940
- GNIS feature ID: 1619960

Fountain is a village in Mason County in the U.S. state of Michigan. The population was 170 at the 2020 census. The village is within Sherman Township.

== History ==
Fountain was founded in 1882 when the railroad was extended to that point. The village was so named on account of there being a spring near the original town site. The village was incorporated in 1913.

== Geography ==
Fountain is in northeast Mason County, 15 miles (24 km) northeast of Ludington, the county seat (19 miles (31 km) by road). According to the United States Census Bureau, the village has a total area of 1.02 square miles (2.64 km^{2}), all of it recorded as land. The North Branch of the Lincoln River flows westward through the southern part of the village.

== Demographics ==
Historical population
Census	Pop.	Note	%±
1920	222		—
1930	223		0.5%
1940	235		5.4%
1950	247		5.1%
1960	194		−21.5%
1970	156		−19.6%
1980	195		25.0%
1990	165		−15.4%
2000	175		6.1%
2010	193		10.3%
2020	170		−11.9%
U.S. Decennial Census

=== 2010 census ===
As of the census of 2010, there were 193 people, 71 households, and 48 families residing in the village. The population density was 191.1 inhabitants per square mile (73.8/km^{2}). There were 83 housing units at an average density of 82.2 per square mile (31.7/km^{2}). The racial makeup of the village was 91.7% White, 3.1% Asian, and 5.2% from two or more races. Hispanic or Latino of any race were 3.6% of the population.

There were 71 households, of which 31.0% had children under the age of 18 living with them, 49.3% were married couples living together, 8.5% had a female householder with no husband present, 9.9% had a male householder with no wife present, and 32.4% were non-families. 21.1% of all households were made up of individuals, and 7% had someone living alone who was 65 years of age or older. The average household size was 2.72 and the average family size was 3.15.

The median age in the village was 37.8 years. 26.9% of residents were under the age of 18; 8.4% were between the ages of 18 and 24; 25.9% were from 25 to 44; 29% were from 45 to 64; and 9.8% were 65 years of age or older. The gender makeup of the village was 53.9% male and 46.1% female.

=== 2000 census ===
As of the census of 2000, there were 175 people, 71 households, and 47 families residing in the village. The population density was 173.7 inhabitants per square mile (67.1/km^{2}). There were 89 housing units at an average density of 88.3 per square mile (34.1/km^{2}). The racial makeup of the village was 97.14% White, 1.14% Native American, 0.57% from other races, and 1.14% from two or more races. Hispanic or Latino of any race were 0.57% of the population.

There were 71 households, out of which 26.8% had children under the age of 18 living with them, 50.7% were married couples living together, 9.9% had a female householder with no husband present, and 32.4% were non-families. 31.0% of all households were made up of individuals, and 12.7% had someone living alone who was 65 years of age or older. The average household size was 2.46 and the average family size was 2.90.

In the village, the population was spread out, with 23.4% under the age of 18, 12.6% from 18 to 24, 27.4% from 25 to 44, 23.4% from 45 to 64, and 13.1% who were 65 years of age or older. The median age was 37 years. For every 100 females, there were 92.3 males. For every 100 females age 18 and over, there were 91.4 males.

The median income for a household in the village was $30,000, and the median income for a family was $50,938. Males had a median income of $31,875 versus $21,875 for females. The per capita income for the village was $19,396. About 3.9% of families and 5.5% of the population were below the poverty line, including none of those under the age of eighteen and 18.8% of those 65 or over.
