= 2022–23 Michigan Tech Huskies men's basketball team =

American college basketball season

2022–23 Michigan Tech Huskies men's basketball
- Conference: Great Lakes Intercollegiate Athletic Conference
- Record: 10–20 (5–13 GLIAC)
- Head coach: Josh Buettner (2nd season)
- Assistant coaches: Ben Stelzer (2nd season); Zach Flener (1st season)
- Home arena: SDC Gymnasium

2022–23 Great Lakes Intercollegiate Athletic Conference men's basketball standings
| | Conf. | | | | Overall |
| Team | W | | L | PCT | W | | L | PCT |
|---|---|---|---|---|---|---|---|---|
| Parkside | 14 | – | 4 | .778 | 21 | – | 7 | .750 |
| Ferris State | 13 | – | 5 | .722 | 22 | – | 7 | .759 |
| Northern Michigan | 13 | – | 5 | .722 | 21 | – | 7 | .750 |
| Lake Superior St. | 12 | – | 6 | .667 | 13 | – | 13 | .500 |
| Grand Valley St | 11 | – | 7 | .611 | 17 | – | 11 | .607 |
| Saginaw Valley St. | 9 | – | 9 | .500 | 14 | – | 14 | .500 |
| Wayne State | 5 | – | 13 | .278 | 8 | – | 17 | .320 |
| Michigan Tech | 5 | – | 13 | .278 | 8 | – | 19 | .296 |
| Purdue Northwest | 5 | – | 13 | .278 | 12 | – | 16 | .429 |
| Davenport | 3 | – | 15 | .167 | 7 | – | 21 | .250 |
† 2023 GLIAC tournament winner Rankings from Poll

The 2022–23 Michigan Tech Huskies men's basketball team represented Michigan Tech in the 2022–23 NCAA Division II men's basketball season. The Huskies were led by a second-year head coach Josh Buettner and played their home games at SDC Gymnasium in Houghton, Michigan as members of the Great Lakes Intercollegiate Athletic Conference (GLIAC).

== Previous season ==
=== Regular season ===
The Huskies finished 16–4 in the GLIAC and 20–6 overall in the 2021–22 season prior to the GLIAC tournament, sweeping rivals Northern Michigan in the process.

=== Postseason ===
The Huskies were the 2-seed in the GLIAC Tournament. They defeated then 7-seed Parkside in the quarterfinals, but lost to the Wildcats of Northern Michigan in the semifinals. Michigan Tech missed the NCAA (DII) tournament due to their position in the GLIAC tournament.

== Offseason ==
=== Coaching changes ===
In the game notes for their matchup against Lewis (November 12, 2022), under the "More News and Notes" section on page six, it is brought up that now former assistant coach Rae Drake retired. In his place appears to be Zach Flener, which is indicated on Page 5, with his name being there put image not yet present.

=== Departures ===
| Name | Number | Pos. | Height | Weight | Year | Hometown | Notes |
|---|---|---|---|---|---|---|---|
| Jalen Carter | 2 | G | 5'10" | 175 | Sr | Chicago, IL | Graduated |
| Matt Ojala | 10 | G | 6'1" | 190 | Fr | Mohawk, MI | Unknown |
| Kyle Clow | 12 | F | 6'5" | 200 | Sr | Germantown, WI | Graduated |
| Carter Johnston | 15 | G | 6'3" | 185 | Sr | Beaverton, MI | Graduated |
| Owen White | 22 | G | 6'6" | 215 | Sr | Rhinelander, WI | Graduated |
| Teeaaron Powell | 42 | C | 6'9" | 240 | Sr | South Holland, IL | Graduated |

=== 2022 recruiting class ===
To make up for how many people would depart at the end of the 2021–22 season, Head Coach Josh Buettner and Michigan Tech went on the lookout. They first offered to Marcus Tomashek, a Junior at Ashwaubenon High School at the time in January 2022, then Dan Gherezgher, and another three students in the class of 2022 throughout the year of 2021.

College recruiting information
| Name | Hometown | School | Height | Weight | Commit date |
|---|---|---|---|---|---|
| Marcus Tomashek; G | Green Bay, WI | Ashwaubenon | 6 ft 6 in (1.98 m) | 190 lb (86 kg) | Jan 26, 2021 |
| Marcus Tomashek; G | Recruit ratings: Scout: Rivals: 247Sports: (N/A) | | | | |
| Dan Gherezgher; G | Brookfield, WI | Brookfield East | 6 ft 3 in (1.91 m) | 180 lb (82 kg) | Mar 15, 2021 |
| Dan Gherezgher; G | Recruit ratings: Scout: Rivals: 247Sports: (N/A) | | | | |
| Drew Barrie; G | Midland, MI | Midland | 6 ft 4 in (1.93 m) | 195 lb (88 kg) | Aug 13, 2021 |
| Drew Barrie; G | Recruit ratings: Scout: Rivals: 247Sports: (N/A) | | | | |
| Josh Terrian; G/F | Pewaukee, WI | Brookfield | 6 ft 4 in (1.93 m) | 200 lb (91 kg) | |
| Josh Terrian; G/F | Recruit ratings: Scout: Rivals: 247Sports: (N/A) | | | | |
| Peyton LaCombe; F | Ludington, MI | Ludington | 6 ft 8 in (2.03 m) | 205 lb (93 kg) | Nov 27, 2021 |
| Peyton LaCombe; F | Recruit ratings: Scout: Rivals: 247Sports: (N/A) | | | | |
Overall recruit ranking:
Note: In many cases, Scout, Rivals, 247Sports, On3, and ESPN may conflict in their listings of height and weight.; In these cases, the average was taken. ESPN grades are on a 100-point scale.; Sources:

=== 2023 Recruiting Class ===
College recruiting information
| Name | Hometown | School | Height | Weight | Commit date |
|---|---|---|---|---|---|
| Luke Hazelton; SF | Maple City, MI | Maple City Glen Lake | 6 ft 7 in (2.01 m) | N/A | Sep 17, 2022 |
| Luke Hazelton; SF | Recruit ratings: Scout: Rivals: 247Sports: (N/A) | | | | |
| Ethan Heck; SG | De Pere, WI | West De Pere High School | 6 ft 5 in (1.96 m) | 180 lb (82 kg) | Nov 24, 2022 |
| Ethan Heck; SG | Recruit ratings: Scout: Rivals: 247Sports: (N/A) | | | | |
| Gabe Smith; SF | Saint Germain, WI | Northland Pines High School | 6 ft 4 in (1.93 m) | N/A | Dec 7, 2022 |
| Gabe Smith; SF | Recruit ratings: Scout: Rivals: 247Sports: (N/A) | | | | |
Overall recruit ranking:
Note: In many cases, Scout, Rivals, 247Sports, On3, and ESPN may conflict in their listings of height and weight.; In these cases, the average was taken. ESPN grades are on a 100-point scale.; Sources:

== Preseason ==
=== Preseason GLIAC coaches poll ===
In the 2022 edition of the GLIAC Preseason Coaches Poll, Michigan Tech was selected to finish fourth place out of the ten teams participating. This years squad were one of four teams receiving a first place vote, with Lake Superior State (1), Northern Michigan (2), and Ferris State (6). The GLIAC also released unofficial awards as part of their release of the Coaches Poll. Michigan Tech's lone representative in the Preseason First and Second Team All-GLIAC was Adam Hobson, who was in the Preseason First Team.

=== Greece exhibition trip ===
The Huskies of Michigan Tech visited Greece for an Exhibition Trip in late August and scheduled three games over the course of nine days.

No one posted any articles about their progress in Greece, outside the fact that their men's basketball team travelled there. However, the official Twitter page for Michigan Tech Men's Basketball posted updates as the days went on in Greece, which is how it's known how they performed. The only score they posted was from their first game, which was won 89-80 (First tweet). The next two games were just an update on whether the squad won or lost, which can be found in order after the first tweet. More info can be found about their trip (more or less) around this period of the timeline. (Note: These may not count as super reliable for some readers, but are the only updates available for this trip)

@mtumbb (August 18, 2022). "Huskies win Game 1 in Greece 89-80. 13 guys scored" (Tweet) – via Twitter.

@mtumbb (August 22, 2022). "Huskies go to 2-0 on the Greece trip! One more tomorrow" (Tweet) – via Twitter.

@mtumbb (August 25, 2022). "Great way to finish the trip! Played well and got another W, followed by a delicious dinner at the foothill of the Acropolis in Athens" (Tweet) – via Twitter.

=== Exhibition game ===
One year after beating Ball State, Michigan Tech visited Green Bay on November third, 2022. This is Michigan Tech's only exhibition before their season starts on November 12.

These two programs are not unfamiliar with each other. They played each other ten times, with their first matchup being on January 27, 1970, which means they play an average of once per five years heading into this matchup. That matchup was an 86–67 win for the Phoenix, the first of an eight-game win streak while hosting the Huskies. The other two games were held in Houghton, Michigan, where the Phoenix are 1–1. However, their last matchup hosted by the Huskies was on February 1, 1972. Their last matchup was in 2011, where Green Bay won 79–71. History repeats itself well, because the Phoenix beat Michigan Tech 72–66. The Phoenix, led by Cade Meyer, were able to grab a 33–22 lead by halftime. Michigan Tech was able to climb within four late in the second, but that was not enough to swing past the Phoenix.

Michigan Tech was led by freshman guard Marcus Tomashek and sophomore Dan Gherezgher, with 21 and 16 points apiece. Pete Calcaterra grabbed 11 of Michigan Tech's 25 boards. The Phoenix were led by Cade Meyer with 22 points. The Huskies were 26–61 in shooting, and Green Bay were 56-percent from the field during the contest.

== Regular season ==
=== Early non-conference games ===
==== Crossover tournament ====
Lewis University and McKendree University visit Michigan Technological University on the weekend of Veterans day as part of the GLIAC-GLVC Challenge. McKendree plays Northern Michigan and Lewis plays Michigan Tech on November 12. McKendree then plays Michigan Tech and Lewis plays Northern Michigan. All four games are hosted by Michigan Tech.

===== Lewis =====
After a strong first four minutes to the game, getting out to a 10–6 lead over the Flyers, Michigan Tech fell cold offensively. The Huskies got outscored 22–6 over the next 8 minutes. The Husky's offense was able to rebound after this series, but were still outscored 11-19 through the 3:39 mark, falling 39–25. This final period of the first half is where the Husky's best offensive performance was since falling behind, outscoring Lewis 9–2. Lewis outscored the Huskies 30–8 in the paint, got five steals, and outrebounded 17–11. Each team had a block. The Huskies were 44% from the field and 40% from deep, compared to Lewis' 59% from the field and 20% from three.

Similar to much of the first half of the game, Michigan Tech's offense fell cold, allowing Lewis to go on a 10–2 run, expanding their lead to fifteen 4:38 into the second half. Michigan Tech's offense was able to come alive sooner than it did in the first half, outscoring Lewis 15–7 over the next 5:54, cutting the Flyer's lead to 51–57. 40 seconds later, when the Huskies were at the Free Throw line, the scoring table noticed that Lewis was playing someone that was not on their roster. There was not anything signaled by the refs, but gave Lewis a Technical Foul. This gave the Huskies an additional free throw in addition to the three regular free throws assigned to them before the call, thanks to a Lewis shooting foul. Eric Carl made the first Free Throw and Marcus Tomashek made the latter three, bringing the Huskies down 55–58 with 8:42 left in the game.

Over the next 4:17, the Huskies outscored Lewis 8–6, bringing the Huskies within one. After a Lewis Shooting Foul with 2:55 left in the game, the Flyers trailed for the first time since 13:07 in the first half. The Flyers outscored Michigan Tech 7–2 over the remainder of the game. Michigan Tech had a couple chances in the final 30 seconds to get two field goals in, but Lewis' defense made it extremely difficult for the Huskies to get anything going and the Huskies were not able to capitalize off their final possession, losing 71–67.

Adam Hobson led all Huskies in points with 25, going 9–17 from the field. He was one of three Huskies with 10 or more points. Jamere Hill lead all Flyers with 16 points, and was one of four with 10-plus points.

===== McKendree =====
In a half defined by a great defensive effort by McKendree and strong offense by the Huskies, Michigan Tech leads 38–34 at the half. After five minutes, the game was tied at eleven and the Huskies struggled with getting rebounds. Unlike their previous game, Michigan Tech's offensive effort did not sputter after the first media timeout. The Huskies offense kept rolling, despite five lead changes and five ties in the first half. McKendree was able to keep up with their offense, trailing by nothing more than ten after the first media timeout at the 14:41 mark. After the 7:00 mark in the first half, McKendree has stayed within 4-7 points behind the Huskies. Michigan Tech also had some foul trouble in the first half, with Gherezgher getting three and Josh Terrian getting two. McKendree was 10/15 from the line, and both teams had a combined 10 Three Pointers and 14 Free Throws. Michigan Tech led 38–34.

Not unlike their game against Lewis, Michigan Tech's offense went cold coming out of the locker room, allowing McKendree to come back to tie it before a 2-pointer by the Huskies to retake the lead, 41–39. The offense did not heat up much over the next four minutes, with Michigan Tech leading 47–43 with 10:48 left in the game. This changed, with the offense starting to come alive over the next seven and a half minutes, and gave the Huskies a chance to extend their lead to 65–56 with 3:14 left. McKendree was able to come back within six, at 69–63 with 1:35 left, but was not enough as Michigan Tech got their first win of the season, 77–67.

Five Huskies were in double digits, with Dan Gherezgher leading the way with 27 points, the most out of either team. McKendree was led by Eric Powell II with 22. Michigan Tech was 44% from the field and 43% from deep, compared to 39% from the field and 35% from three for McKendree.

==== Minnesota Crookston ====
After taking an early 4–2 lead over the Golden Eagles of Minnesota-Crookston. the huskies were able to build on their offensive performance against McKendree, growing their lead to 10 points, 20–10, with 10:30 left in the first half. At around the 12-13 minute mark, one of Minnesota Crookston's players got injured and left the game and was not seen at their bench heading into the locker room. After getting their lead to 10 points, the Huskies started missing their shots, and allowed the Golden Eagles to tie the game over the next four minutes. The Huskies trailed a couple times, never more than three points, over the final four minutes of the half before retaking the a 31–30 with around 31 seconds left in the first half. That was the score heading into the locker room.

Getting back on offense was no concern for either team as they combined for 19 points in the first 4.5 minutes coming out of the locker room. It did not stop their either, they combined for another 18 points over the next four minutes, with Michigan Tech expanding their lead to 52–46 at the 10:23 mark in the second half. After this, the game became a more back-and-forth sort of matchup, with the Golden Eagles getting within two, 50-52 before the Huskies got 17 of the next 24 points by the 3:16 mark, grabbing a 69–57 lead. Minnesota-Crookston took their chance to go on a shooting spree, erasing Michigan Tech's lead to make the game 73–70 in favor of the Huskies with just 25.7 seconds left. The Huskies were able to convert on their Free Throws to seal the game 76–72 in Houghton.

The game was highlighted by 42-43% shooting by both teams, five turnovers by the Huskies, and a combined 74 points in the paint. The Huskies were led by Adam Hobson, Pete Calcaterra, and Dan Gherezgher, all with 15 or more points. Minnesota-Crookston was led by starter Matthew Allman with 16 points, and by Marcus Thompson with 13 points off the bench.

==== UMSL Tournament ====
The Huskies will travel to St. Louis to play Maryville (Mo.) and Missouri-St. Louis on November 22 and November 23.

===== Maryville (Mo.) =====
The Huskies lost to Maryville 77–86 in Saint Louis. The Huskies had 17 fouls overall in the contest, with 11 coming in the second-half. This allowed Maryville to attempt twenty-six free throws, and made twenty of them. Fifteen of their twenty made free throws came in the second-half, when it mattered most in the game. Both teams shot over 50% from the field and 48% or better from beyond the arc. The Huskies made 13 three's to Maryville's 12 three's, and made three more field goals than Maryville throughout this game, which emphasizes the importance of how many free throws Maryville attempted and made in this contest.

The Huskies were led by Adam Hobson with 20 points, 7 boards, and 4 assists on 9-16 shooting. Maryville was led by Kelvin Swims with 19 points, 1 board, and 7 assists on 8-10 shooting.

===== UMSL =====
The Huskies were able to continue their hot shooting from their Maryville game, getting 11 Field Goals from 21 attempts. The Huskies led for 12:50 of the first half but fell behind six points after two late three pointers by the Tritons in the last 63 seconds of the first half. This ended up being everything the Tritons needed to get the game in their favor. They outscored the Huskies 42–30 in the second half, never truly slowing to maintain a lead above eleven points throughout the second half.

The Tritons performance was highlighted by four players getting in double digits, 57% Field Goal Percentage, 9 steals, and 46 points in the paint, and 30 points off turnovers. They were led by Isaiah Fuller with 14 points, 6 boards, and 4 steals.

The Huskies were led by Tyler Robarge with 12 points, 4 boards, and an assist. Their performance was highlighted by 52.4% shooting in the first half, and 22 points off the bench.

==== 18. Minnesota Duluth ====
The Huskies continued their six-game road trip with a pair of matchups in Minnesota, starting with the Number 18 Minnesota Duluth.

The Huskies fought early, remaining within five point and trailing 15–16 at the 11:30 mark. After trailing 18–20 with 9:58 left in the first half, Michigan Tech failed to get back within a few points, and was on the receiving end of a 28-14 Bulldogs run to take the Bulldogs into the half up 48–32. One the Bulldogs retained a 30-point lead in the second half, they did all they could do to make sure that it stuck, and it worked. The Huskies ended up losing 65–99 in Duluth.

The Huskies were led by Eric Carl with 11 points and Pete Calcaterra with seven boards. The Bulldogs were led by Drew Blair with 22 points and Charlie Katona with 9 boards. Eric Carl with the only Husky in double digits while the Bulldogs had all their starters reach double digits.

- Note there is a difference in points scored for each team in both halves on the Michigan Tech site and Minnesota-Duluth site. The stats used for this summary are used by the latter.

==== Saint Cloud State ====
The Huskies of Michigan Tech were able to get out to an early 4–0 lead but was not able to carry any momentum, falling behind 19 points. Saint Cloud State led 41–22 at the half. The Huskies of Saint Cloud State expanded that lead to 22 points less than five minutes coming out of the locker room, but that did not stop Michigan Tech from fighting hard to come back and win it. Michigan Tech got their 22-point deficit down to 10 points in 9.5 minutes, with 5:52 left in the game. But, that did not stop Saint Cloud State from ensuring a victory, outscoring Tech by eight points over the remainder of the game to win it 74–56.

Saint Cloud State was led by Luke Taylor with 18 points and seven boards, and Matthew Willert with 17 points and three boards. Michigan Tech was led by Marcus Tomashek with 20 points and six rebounds.

=== GLIAC Play ===
Coming off a four-game losing streak, the Huskies sought to change that with a visit to Wisconsin-Parkside in Kenosha, Wisconsin on December 1, 2022, to tip off GLIAC play.

==== Parkside ====
Looking to end a 4-game losing streak, the Huskies visited Parkside and got out to an early 14–13 lead that never stuck. The Huskies fell 16–28 at the half, after getting outscored 13-2 since their narrow lead. There was still some hope for the Huskies entering the second half, but a serious amount of turnovers resulted in a 12-point deficit to grow by ten with just a minute left in the game.

The Huskies were led by Adam Hobson with 11 points and 5 rebounds, the only Husky in double digits. Parkside was led by Rasheed Bello with 16 points, one of four Rangers with ten or more points.

==== Purdue Northwest ====
Heading into the conclusion of their seven-game, the Huskies only won one game. They went into Kenosha looking to make that two. After the first half, the Huskies led 42–31 on 50% shooting and 28 points in the paint. That did not end up mattering, however, because the Pride came back and outscored the Huskies 42–26, limiting Tech to 29.2% shooting and six points in the paint.

The Huskies were led by Adam Hobson with 19 points, 4 rebounds, and 4 assists. Mikell Cooper led the Pride with 30 points and six rebounds on 55% shooting in 38 minutes.

==== Lake Superior State ====
Following a poor first half offense and second half defense, the Huskies fell to Lake Superior State 63–73. Shooting a short 25% from the field in the first half, the Huskies were unable to create anything meaningful heading into the locker room, including a failed attempt to reach 20 first-half points, sitting at 16. The Lakers held a 26–16 advantage heading into the second half and was able to hold on to that 10-point lead all the way through to the final buzzer, despite Tech putting up 47 second-half points.

Lake Superior State was led by Kemon Bassett with a 17-point, 10 rebound Double-Double and Caden Ebling with 12 points. The Huskies were led by Marcus Tomashek, Dan Gherezgher, Pete Calcaterra, and Brad Simonsen, all with 11-12 points, and the latter three coming off the bench.

==== Ferris State ====
Following a seven-game losing streak, the Huskies shot 50% from the field and got 35 points off the bench to defeat Ferris State 69–68. Tech had four players score in double digits, scoring a combined 45 points. The Huskies were led by Adam Hobson and Dan Gherezgher.

=== Late Non-Conference Game ===
==== Kentucky Wesleyan ====
To finish off 2022, the Huskies visited the Panthers of Kentucky-Wesleyan in hopes to extend their win streak to 2+ games since mid-November. Things did not work out in their favor, however. Tech ended up losing 65-85 after getting outscored 47–28 in the first half. The game was close for the first seven minutes of the game before the Panthers took the lead and never looked back.

Brad Simonsen led the Huskies with 20 points and 4 rebounds coming off the bench. The Panthers were led by six players reaching double digits.

=== Other Conference Games ===
==== Saginaw Valley State ====
In yet another game of poor shooting, the Huskies trailed 27-37 at the half after going 10-30 from the floor and 4-7 from the line. Their hopes did not increase much during the second half, shooting 29.03% from the field (9-31). The Huskies out-rebounded the Lakers 43-27.

Marcus Tomashek led all Huskies with 12 points and 2 rebounds. Tre Garrett led all Lakers with 17 points and 3 assists.

==== Wayne State ====
The Huskies of Michigan Tech and Warriors of Wayne State play in Detroit on January 7 at 3:00 PM Eastern Time.

== Roster ==
2022–23 Michigan Tech Huskies men's basketball team
Players
Coaches

| Pos. | # | Name | Height | Weight | Year | Previous school | Hometown |
|---|---|---|---|---|---|---|---|
| G | 1 | Marcus Tomashek | 6 ft 6 in (1.98 m) | 190 lb (86 kg) | Fr | Ashwaubenon High School | Green Bay, WI |
| G | 2 | Dan Gherezgher | 6 ft 3 in (1.91 m) | 180 lb (82 kg) | Fr | Brookfield East High School | Brookfield, WI |
| G | 3 | Nate Abel | 6 ft 2 in (1.88 m) | 180 lb (82 kg) | RS Fr | Beaver Dam High School | Beaver Dam, WI |
| G | 4 | Jason Waterman | 6 ft 0 in (1.83 m) | 180 lb (82 kg) | So | Negaunee High School | Negaunee, MI |
| G | 5 | Adam Hobson | 6 ft 4 in (1.93 m) | 190 lb (86 kg) | So | Stoughton High School | Stoughton, WI |
| G | 10 | Drew Barrie | 6 ft 4 in (1.93 m) | 195 lb (88 kg) | Fr | Midland High School | Midland, MI |
| G | 11 | Pete Calcaterra | 6 ft 6 in (1.98 m) | 190 lb (86 kg) | So | Boyne City HS | Boyne City, MI |
| G/F | 13 | Josh Terrian | 6 ft 4 in (1.93 m) | 200 lb (91 kg) | Fr | Pewaukee HS | Pewaukee, WI |
| G | 20 | Devin Schmitz | 6 ft 0 in (1.83 m) | 160 lb (73 kg) | Sr | Dollar Bay HS | Dollar Bay, MI |
| G | 21 | Eric Carl | 6 ft 5 in (1.96 m) | 190 lb (86 kg) | Sr | Kaukauna HS | Kaukauna, WI |
| G | 24 | Logan Geissler | 6 ft 1 in (1.85 m) | 175 lb (79 kg) | So | Bay Port HS | Green Bay, WI |
| F | 30 | Brad Simonsen | 6 ft 6 in (1.98 m) | 210 lb (95 kg) | So | Houghton HS | Houghton, MI |
| F | 33 | Dawson Nordgaard | 6 ft 8 in (2.03 m) | 215 lb (98 kg) | RS Fr | West De Pere HS | De Pere, WI |
| F | 42 | Peyton LaCombe | 6 ft 8 in (2.03 m) | 205 lb (93 kg) | Fr | Ludington HS | Ludington, MI |
| C | 44 | Tyler Robarge | 6 ft 8 in (2.03 m) | 230 lb (104 kg) | Jr | Chippewa Falls HS | Chippewa Falls, WI |

Head coach

- Josh Buettner (Michigan Tech)

Assistant coach(es)

- Rae Drake Jr (Michigan Tech)

Legend

- (C) Team captain
- (S) Suspended
- (I) Ineligible
- (W) Walk-on
- Injured
- Current redshirt

Roster

== Schedule and results ==
On July 6, 2022, the Michigan Tech basketball program released their 2022-23 basketball schedule, featuring 27 games, 14 of which at SDC Gymnasium, and 19 conference matchups. Their pre-season games were also announced on August 16, en route to Greece to play three games over the course of nine days. Their first game will be against a U-20 team, and the other two games are in the days before the team's return to the US. Prior to their trip to Greece, it was announced that Michigan Tech's football and basketball games, among other sports and other GLIAC schools would be using the FloSports streaming platform for these sports. As a result, it is likely that most of the Huskies' home and conference games will be streamed on this site.

| Date time, TV | Rank^{#} | Opponent^{#} | Result | Record | High points | High rebounds | High assists | Site (attendance) city, state |
Greece exhibition trip
| August 18, 2022* | | at Greek National Select Team | W 89–80 | 1–0 | – | – | – | Athens, Greece |
| August 22, 2022*; 7:00 p.m. | | at Maroussi BC | W 1–0 | 2–0 | – | – | – | Athens, Greece |
| August 23, 2022*; 7:00 p.m. | | at Melissia BC | W 1–0 | 3–0 | – | – | – | Athens, Greece |
Exhibition
| November 3, 2022*; 8:00 p.m. | | at Green Bay | L 66–72 | | 21 – Tomashek | 11 – Calcaterra | 3 – Hobson | Kress Events Center (1,831); Green Bay, WI |
Regular Season
| November 12, 2022*; 2:00 p.m., FloSports | | Lewis; Crossover Tournament | L 67–71 | 0–1 | 25 – Hobson | 4 – 2 tied | 4 – Terrian | SDC Gymnasium (722); Houghton, MI |
| November 13, 2022*; 2:00 p.m., FloSports | | McKendree; Crossover Tournament | W 77–67 | 1–1 | 27 – Gherezgher | 9 – Calcaterra | 4 – Hobson | SDC Gymnasium (571); Houghton, MI |
| November 18, 2022*; 6:00 p.m., FloSports | | Minnesota Crookston | W 76–72 | 2–1 | 19 – Hobson | 10 – Terrian | 4 – Terrian | SDC Gymnasium (497); Houghton, MI |
| November 22, 2022*; 2:00 p.m., GLVCSN | | vs. Maryville (Mo.); UMSL Tournament | L 77–86 | 2–2 | 20 – Hobson | 2 – Hobson | 4 – 2 tied | Mark Twain Building (73); St. Louis, MO |
| November 23, 2022*; 4:15 p.m., GLVCSN | | vs. Missouri-St. Louis; UMSL Tournament | L 57–75 | 2–3 | 12 – Robarge | 5 – Carl | 4 – Carl | Mark Twain Building (227); St. Louis, MO |
| November 26, 2022*; 2:00 p.m., NSIC | | at No. 18 Minnesota Duluth | L 65–99 | 2–4 | 11 – Carl | 7 – Calcaterra | 2 – 5 tied | Romano Gymnasium (425); Duluth, MN |
| November 27, 2022*; 2:00 p.m., NSIC | | at St. Cloud State | L 56-74 | 2–5 | 20 – Tomashek | 6 – Tomashek | 4 – Gherezgher | Hallenbeck Hall (256); St. Cloud, MN |
| December 1, 2022; 8:30 p.m., FloSports | | at Parkside | L 49–72 | 2–6 (0–1) | 11 – Hobson | 6 – Robarge | 2 – Hobson | De Simone Arena (599); Kenosha, WI |
| December 3, 2022; 4:00 p.m., JedTV | | at Purdue Northwest | L 68–73 | 2–7 (0–2) | 19 – Hobson | 5 – Calcaterra | 4 – Hobson | John Friend Court (400); Hammond, IN |
| December 9, 2022; 7:30 p.m., FloSports | | Lake Superior State | L 63–73 | 2–8 (0–3) | 12 – Simonsen | 4 – Robarge | 2 – 2 tied | SDC Gymnasium (645); Houghton, MI |
| December 11, 2022; 3:00 p.m., FloSports | | Ferris State | W 69–68 | 3–8 (1–3) | 12 – 2 tied | 5 – 2 tied | 2 – 2 tied | SDC Gymnasium (792); Houghton, MI |
| December 19, 2022*; 8:00 p.m. | | at Kentucky Wesleyan College | L 65–85 | 3–9 (1–3) | 20 – Simonsen | 6 – Robarge | 3 – 2 tied | Owensboro Sports Center (420); Owensboro, KY |
| January 5, 2023; 8:00 p.m., FloSports | | at Saginaw Valley St. | L 58–69 | 3–10 (1–4) | 12 – Tomashek | 7 – 2 tied | 2 – 3 tied | James E. O'niell Arena (123); University Center, MI |
| January 7, 2023; 3:00 p.m., FloSports | | at Wayne State | L 65–72 ^{OT} | 3–11 (1–5) | 17 – Tomashek | 9 – Calcaterra | 2 – 5 tied | Wayne State Fieldhouse (497); Detroit, MI |
| January 11, 2023*; 6:00 p.m., FloSports | | Finlandia | W 103–35 | 4–11 (1–5) | 13 – Abel | 11 – Calcaterra | 6 – Terrian | SDC Gymnasium (301); Houghton, MI |
| January 14, 2023; 1:00 p.m., FloSports | | at Northern Michigan | L 65–90 | 4–12 (1–6) | 14 – Gherezgher | 5 – Gherezgher | 2 – 5 tied | Berry Events Center (1,169); Marquette, MI |
| January 19, 2023; 7:30 p.m., FloSports | | Davenport | L 77–90 | 4–13 (1–7) | 21 – Gherezgher | 7 – Calcaterra | 4 – Terrian | SDC Gymnasium (675); Houghton, MI |
| January 21, 2023; 3:00 p.m., FloSports | | Grand Valley State | L 61–74 | 4–14 (1–8) | 16 – Hobson | 4 – Hobson | 3 – tied | SDC Gymnasium (1,028); Houghton, MI |
| January 26, 2023; 7:30 p.m., FloSports | | Ferris State | L 50–78 | 4–15 (1–9) | 11 – Simonsen | 2 – tied | 4 – Terrian | Jim Wink Arena (1,189); Big Rapids, MI |
| January 28, 2023; 3:00 p.m., FloSports | | Lake Superior State | W 76–71 | 5–15 (2–9) | 17 – Gherezgher | 6 – tied | 5 – Gherezgher | SDC Gymnasium (276); Houghton, MI |
| February 2, 2023; 7:30 p.m., FloSports | | Wayne State | W 78–58 | 6–15 (3–9) | 20 – Gherezgher | 4 – tied | 3 – Gherezgher | SDC Gymnasium (635); Houghton, MI |
| February 4, 2023; 3:00 p.m., FloSports | | Saginaw Valley State | W 75–67 | 7–15 (4–9) | 15 – Abel | 9 – Calcaterra | 3 – tied | SDC Gymnasium (864); Houghton, MI |
| February 9, 2023; 8:00 p.m., FloSports | | at Grand Valley State | L 74–79 | 7–16 (4–10) | 20 – Gherezgher | 8 – Hobson | 4 – Hobson | Field House Arena (724); Allendale, MI |
| February 11, 2023; 3:00 p.m., FloSports | | Davenport | L 71–77 | 7–17 (4–11) | 17 – Hobson | 7 – Hobson | 5 – Geissler | DU Student Center (215); Grand Rapids, MI |
| February 16, 2023; 7:30 p.m., FloSports | | Purdue Northwest | W 71–70 | 8–17 (5–11) | 22 – Calcaterra | 10 – Calcaterra | 3 – Hobson | SDC Gymnasium (578); Houghton, MI |
| February 18, 2023; 7:30 p.m., FloSports | | Parkside | L 58–76 | 8–18 (5–12) | 15 – Hobson | 5 – Calcaterra | 2 – 3 tied | SDC Gymnasium (864); Houghton, MI |
| February 25, 2023; 3:00 p.m., FloSports | | Northern Michigan; Rivalry / Senior Night | L 57–65 | 8–19 (5–13) | 15 – Gherezgher | 9 – Calcaterra | 4 – Terrian | SDC Gymnasium (1,203); Houghton, MI |
GLIAC Men's Tournament 2023
| March 1, 2023†; 7:30 p.m., FloSports | (8) | at (1) Parkside; GLIAC quarterfinals | W 73–68 | 9–19 | 26 – Tomashek | 8 – Calcaterra | 3 – Calcaterra | De Simone Arena (1,004); Kenosha, WI |
| March 4, 2023; 5:30 p.m., FloSports | (8) | at (4) Grand Valley State; GLIAC Semifinals | W 73–69 | 10–19 | 22 – Tomashek | 9 – Calcaterra | 7 – Calcaterra | Jim Winck Arena (975); Big Rapids |
| March 5, 2023; 3:00 p.m., FloSports | (8) | at (3) Northern Michigan; GLIAC championship game | L 66–79 | 10–20 | 15 – Gherezgher | 9 – Calcaterra | 6 – Gherezgher | Jim Winck Arena (917); Big Rapids |
*Non-conference game. ^{#}Rankings from AP Poll. (#) Tournament seedings in parentheses. All times are in Eastern.

† If in top 8 finishers of GLIAC Source:

== Player statistics ==
Individual player statistics (Through March 6, 2023)
| | | | Minutes | | Scoring | | Total FGs | | | 3-point FGs | | | Free throws | | | Rebounds | | | | | | | |
| Player | GP | GS | Tot | Avg | Pts | Avg | FG | FGA | Pct | 3FG | 3FA | Pct | FT | FTA | Pct | Off | Def | Tot | Avg | A | Stl | Blk | TO |
|---|---|---|---|---|---|---|---|---|---|---|---|---|---|---|---|---|---|---|---|---|---|---|---|
| Abel, Nate | 26 | 0 | 331 | 12.7 | 114 | 4.4 | 40 | 86 | .465 | 22 | 48 | .458 | 12 | 20 | .600 | 15 | 23 | 38 | 1.5 | 20 | 5 | 2 | 21 |
| Calcaterra, Pete | 30 | 11 | 625 | 20.8 | 248 | 8.3 | 94 | 171 | .550 | 11 | 36 | .306 | 49 | 71 | .690 | 32 | 135 | 167 | 5.6 | 45 | 33 | 9 | 39 |
| Carl, Eric | 30 | 11 | 669 | 22.3 | 157 | 5.2 | 51 | 119 | .429 | 37 | 85 | .435 | 18 | 20 | .900 | 7 | 38 | 45 | 1.5 | 38 | 17 | 5 | 28 |
| Geissler, Logan | 18 | 0 | 102 | 5.7 | 5 | 0.3 | 2 | 6 | .333 | 0 | 1 | .000 | 1 | 4 | .250 | 2 | 6 | 8 | 0.4 | 11 | 2 | 0 | 8 |
| Gherezgher, Dan | 28 | 20 | 729 | 26.0 | 323 | 11.5 | 124 | 303 | .409 | 30 | 104 | .288 | 45 | 58 | .776 | 16 | 67 | 83 | 3.0 | 52 | 22 | 7 | 56 |
| Hobson, Adam | 28 | 28 | 798 | 28.5 | 293 | 10.5 | 101 | 253 | .399 | 41 | 119 | .345 | 50 | 62 | .806 | 20 | 85 | 105 | 3.8 | 58 | 18 | 9 | 62 |
| Nordgaard, Dawson | 25 | 0 | 184 | 7.4 | 88 | 3.5 | 39 | 61 | .639 | 0 | 0 | | 10 | 16 | .625 | 15 | 22 | 37 | 1.5 | 9 | 5 | 4 | 16 |
| Robarge, Tyler | 28 | 18 | 396 | 14.1 | 119 | 4.3 | 55 | 98 | .561 | 0 | 0 | | 9 | 27 | .333 | 18 | 64 | 82 | 2.9 | 21 | 4 | 8 | 30 |
| Simonsen, Brad | 30 | 1 | 447 | 14.9 | 181 | 6.0 | 66 | 152 | .434 | 37 | 90 | .411 | 12 | 17 | .706 | 18 | 62 | 80 | 2.7 | 10 | 10 | 4 | 26 |
| Terrian, Josh | 30 | 30 | 740 | 24.7 | 98 | 3.3 | 29 | 90 | .322 | 23 | 71 | .324 | 17 | 25 | .680 | 13 | 80 | 93 | 3.1 | 59 | 23 | 5 | 22 |
| Tomashek, Marcus | 28 | 25 | 763 | 27.3 | 325 | 11.6 | 108 | 289 | .374 | 63 | 181 | .348 | 46 | 54 | .852 | 8 | 63 | 71 | 2.5 | 34 | 14 | 8 | 47 |
| Waterman, Jason | 10 | 0 | 26 | 2.6 | 12 | 1.2 | 5 | 8 | .625 | 2 | 3 | .667 | 0 | 1 | .000 | 0 | 4 | 4 | 0.4 | 1 | 1 | 0 | 1 |
| Total | 30 | | 6024 | | 2040 | 68.0 | 741 | 1711 | .433 | 281 | 778 | .361 | 277 | 385 | .719 | 209 | 711 | 920 | 30.7 | 375 | 156 | 65 | 382 |
| Opponents | 30 | | 6024 | | 2202 | 73.4 | 784 | 1648 | .476 | 198 | 515 | .384 | 436 | 597 | .730 | 235 | 815 | 1050 | 35.0 | 350 | 196 | 75 | 362 |

Legend
| GP | Games played | GS | Games started | Avg | Average per game |
| FG | Field-goals made | FGA | Field-goal attempts | Off | Offensive rebounds |
| Def | Defensive rebounds | A | Assists | TO | Turnovers |
| Blk | Blocks | Stl | Steals |
