= Victory Township, Michigan =

- Civil township
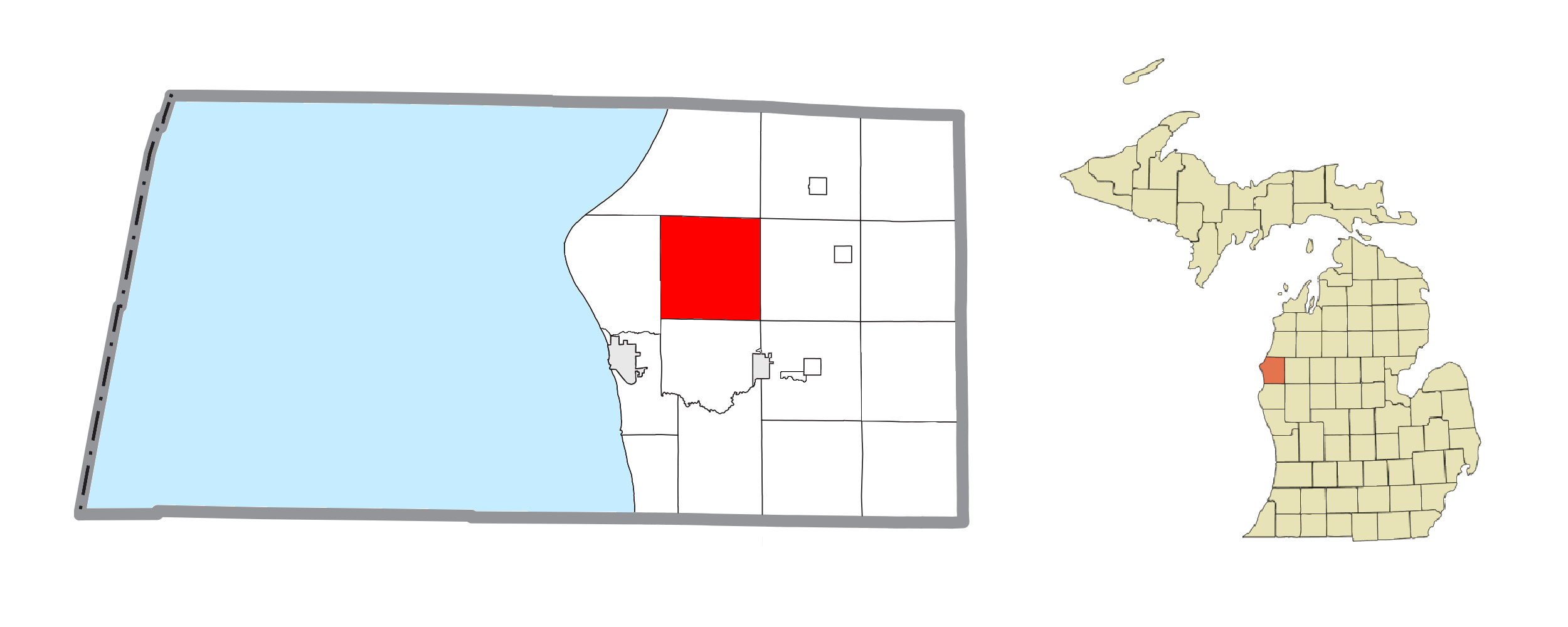
- Location within Mason County

- Location within Michigan Location within the United States
- Coordinates: 44°01′52″N 86°20′43″W
- Country: United States
- State: Michigan
- County: Mason
- Organized: 1868

Government
  - Supervisor: Jim Mazur
  - Clerk: Barbara Egeler

Area
  - Total: 36.50 sq mi (94.5 km^{2})
  - Land: 35.93 sq mi (93.1 km^{2})
  - Water: 0.57 sq mi (1.5 km^{2})
- Elevation: 673 ft (205 m)

Population (2020)
  - Total: 1,406
  - Density: 39.1/sq mi (15.1/km^{2})
- Time zone: UTC-5 (Eastern (EST))
  - Summer (DST): UTC-4 (EDT)
- ZIP Codes: 49431 (Ludington); 49454 (Scottville); 49411 (Free Soil)
- Area code: 231
- FIPS code: 26-105-82360
- GNIS feature ID: 1627200
- Website: www.victorytownship.org

Victory Township is a civil township of Mason County in the U.S. state of Michigan. The population was 1,406 at the 2020 census.

== History ==
The township was organized in 1868. It was perhaps named in commemoration of Union victory in the Civil War.

== Communities ==
- Chapple Corners was an unincorporated community on the Big Sable River. It was founded in 1864 and had a post office from 1874 until 1881.

== Geography ==
The township is in northwestern Mason County. U.S. Route 31 runs north to south along the township's eastern border. According to the U.S. Census Bureau, the township has a total area of 36.50 square miles (94.53 km^{2}), of which 35.93 square miles (93.06 km^{2}) are land and 0.57 square miles (1.48 km^{2}), or 1.56%, are water. The Lincoln River, with its north and south branches, drains the central and southern part of the township, while the northern part drains to the Big Sable River, which crosses the northwest corner of the township as part of Hamlin Lake. Both rivers drain west to Lake Michigan.

== Demographics ==
Historical population
| Census | Pop. | Note | %± |
|---|---|---|---|
| 2000 | 1,444 | | — |
| 2010 | 1,384 | | −4.2% |
| 2020 | 1,406 | | 1.6% |

At the 2000 census, there were 1,444 people, 497 households and 376 families residing in the township. The population density was 40.2 per square mile (15.5/km^{2}). There were 572 housing units at an average density of 15.9 per square mile (6.1/km^{2}). The racial make-up was 95.91% White, 0.55% African American, 0.83% Native American, 0.42% Asian, 0.97% from other races, and 1.32% from two or more races. Hispanic or Latino of any race were 1.87% of the population.

There were 497 households, of which 34.6% had children under the age of 18 living with them, 63.6% were married couples living together, 6.4% had a female householder with no husband present, and 24.3% were non-families. 20.1% of all households were made up of individuals, and 7.4% had someone living alone who was 65 years of age or older. The average household size was 2.72 and the average family size was 3.12.

25.6% of the population were under the age of 18, 6.4% from 18 to 24, 28.3% from 25 to 44, 24.1% from 45 to 64 and 15.7% were 65 years of age or older. The median age was 39 years. For every 100 females, there were 99.7 males. For every 100 females age 18 and over, there were 94.9 males.

The median household income was $41,667 and the median family income was $44,402. Males had a median income of $32,391 and females $21,591. The per capita income was $17,140. About 7.0% of families and 7.8% of the population were below the poverty line, including 7.5% of those under age 18 and 7.7% of those age 65 or over.
