= Sherman Township, Mason County, Michigan =

Sherman Township, Michigan
- Civil township
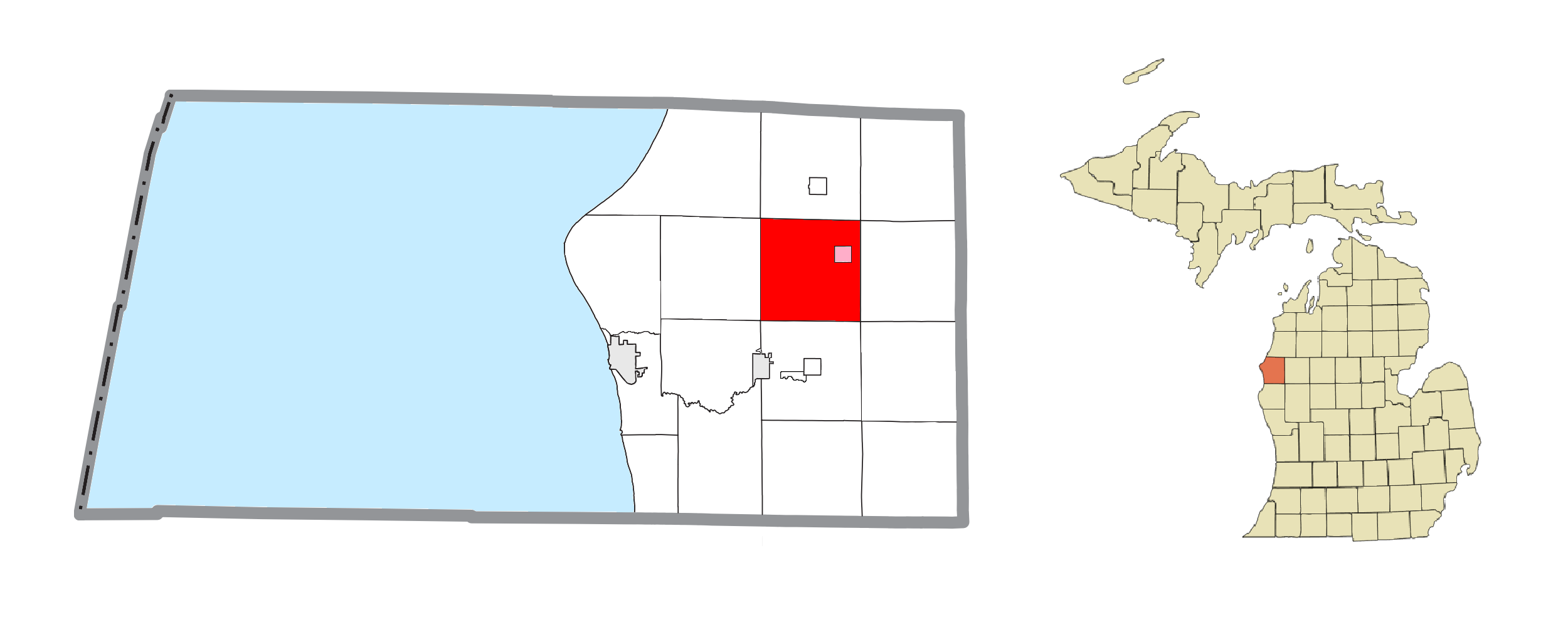
- Location within Mason County (red) and the administered village of Fountain (pink)

- Location within Michigan Location within the United States
- Coordinates: 44°02′47″N 86°12′21″W
- Country: United States
- State: Michigan
- County: Mason
- Established: 1867

Government
  - Supervisor: Joseph Mickevich
  - Clerk: Kurt Lubben

Area
  - Total: 36.29 sq mi (94.0 km^{2})
  - Land: 36.23 sq mi (93.8 km^{2})
  - Water: 0.06 sq mi (0.16 km^{2})
- Elevation: 705 ft (215 m)

Population (2020)
  - Total: 1,127
  - Density: 31.1/sq mi (12.0/km^{2})
- Time zone: UTC-5 (Eastern (EST))
  - Summer (DST): UTC-4 (EDT)
- ZIP Codes: 49410 (Fountain); 49405 (Custer); 49411 (Free Soil); 49454 (Scottville)
- Area code: 231
- FIPS code: 26-105-73240
- GNIS feature ID: 1627075
- Website: https://shermantwpmasonmi.gov/

Sherman Township is a civil township of Mason County in the U.S. state of Michigan. The population was 1,127 at the 2020 census.

== History ==
The township was organized in 1867. It was named for William Tecumseh Sherman, a Union Army general.

== Geography ==
Sherman Township is in central Mason County. The village of Fountain is in the northeast part of the township. According to the United States Census Bureau, the township has a total area of 36.29 square miles (93.99 km^{2}), of which 36.23 square miles (93.84 km^{2}) are land and 0.06 square miles (0.16 km^{2}), or 0.15%, are water. The township is drained by the north and south branches of the Lincoln River, a west-flowing tributary of Lake Michigan.

== Demographics ==
As of the census of 2000, there were 1,090 people, 414 households, and 313 families residing in the township. The population density was 30.1 inhabitants per square mile (11.6/km^{2}). There were 509 housing units at an average density of 14.1 per square mile (5.4/km^{2}). The racial makeup of the township was 95.32% White, 0.64% African American, 0.92% Native American, 0.09% Asian, 0.09% from other races, and 2.94% from two or more races. Hispanic or Latino of any race were 1.01% of the population.

There were 414 households, out of which 32.9% had children under the age of 18 living with them, 63.3% were married couples living together, 7.5% had a female householder with no husband present, and 24.2% were non-families. 21.3% of all households were made up of individuals, and 7.0% had someone living alone who was 65 years of age or older. The average household size was 2.63 and the average family size was 2.96.

In the township the population was spread out, with 26.7% under the age of 18, 7.6% from 18 to 24, 29.9% from 25 to 44, 25.0% from 45 to 64, and 10.8% who were 65 years of age or older. The median age was 38 years. For every 100 females, there were 103.7 males. For every 100 females age 18 and over, there were 99.3 males.

The median income for a household in the township was $34,083, and the median income for a family was $37,368. Males had a median income of $31,324 versus $21,548 for females. The per capita income for the township was $16,251. About 4.1% of families and 4.8% of the population were below the poverty line, including 2.5% of those under age 18 and 9.5% of those age 65 or over.
