= Eden Township =

Eden Township may refer to:

== California ==
- Eden Township, Alameda County, California, a former township

== Kansas ==
- Eden Township, Ness County, Kansas
- Eden Township, Sumner County, Kansas; see List of townships in Kansas

== Illinois ==
- Eden Township, LaSalle County, Illinois

== Indiana ==
- Eden Township, LaGrange County, Indiana

== Iowa ==
- Eden Township, Benton County, Iowa
- Eden Township, Carroll County, Iowa
- Eden Township, Clinton County, Iowa
- Eden Township, Decatur County, Iowa
- Eden Township, Fayette County, Iowa
- Eden Township, Marshall County, Iowa
- Eden Township, Winnebago County, Iowa

== Michigan ==
- Eden Township, Lake County, Michigan
- Eden Township, Mason County, Michigan

== Minnesota ==
- Eden Township, Brown County, Minnesota
- Eden Township, Pipestone County, Minnesota
- Eden Township, Polk County, Minnesota

== Nebraska ==
- Eden Township, Antelope County, Nebraska

== North Dakota ==
- Eden Township, Walsh County, North Dakota

== Ohio ==
- Eden Township, Licking County, Ohio
- Eden Township, Seneca County, Ohio
- Eden Township, Wyandot County, Ohio

== Pennsylvania ==
- Eden Township, Lancaster County, Pennsylvania

== South Dakota ==
- Any of several townships in South Dakota
