= Ludington High School =

Public secondary school in Ludington, Michigan, United States

Location
- 508 N. Washington Avenue; Ludington, Michigan 49431; United States
- Coordinates: 43.96091°N 86.43848°W

Information
- Type: Public secondary school
- Founded: 1880
- School district: Ludington Area Schools
- Superintendent: Kyle Corlett
- Principal: Steve Foresburg
- Teaching staff: 33.42 (on an FTE basis)
- Grades: 9-12
- Enrollment: 687 (2024-2025)
- Student to teacher ratio: 20.56
- Colors: Orange and black
- Athletics: MHSAA Class B; D-4
- Athletics conference: West Michigan Conference
- Nickname: Orioles
- Rival: Manistee High School and Mason County Central High School
- Yearbook: Oriole
- Website: www.lasd.net/schools/ludington-high-school/

Student assessments
- 2021–22 school year Change vs. prior year

M-STEP 11th grade proficiency rates (Science / Social Studies)
- Advanced %: 19.5 / 11.4
- Proficient %: 26.2 / 35.6
- PR. Proficient %: 15.4 / 41.6
- Not Proficient %: 38.9 / 11.4

Average test scores
- SAT Total: 991.0 (▼ −30.7)

Ludington High School (LHS) is a public secondary school in Ludington, Michigan, United States. It serves grades 9–12 for the Ludington Area Schools district of Mason County.

== Demographics ==
The demographic breakdown of the 685 students enrolled at LHS in 2020–21 was:

- Male - 49.4%
- Female - 50.6%
- Native American - 0.3%
- Asian - 1.0%
- Black - 1.2%
- Hispanic - 9.9%
- Pacific Islander - 0.1%
- White - 82.5%
- Multiracial - 5.0%

In addition, 260 students (38%) were eligible for reduced-price or free lunch.
