= Summit Township, Mason County, Michigan =

Summit Township, Michigan
- Civil township
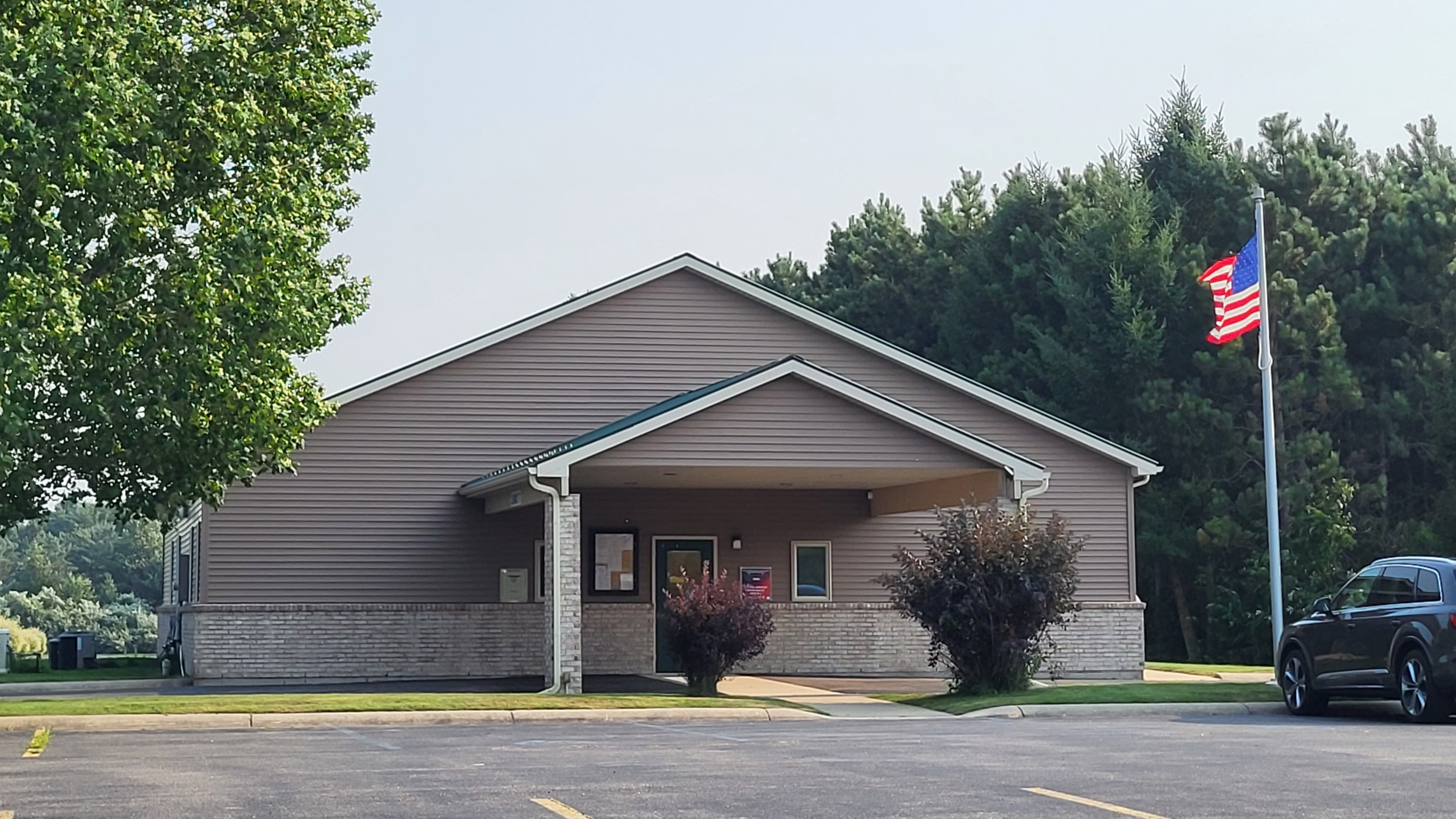
- Summit Township Hall

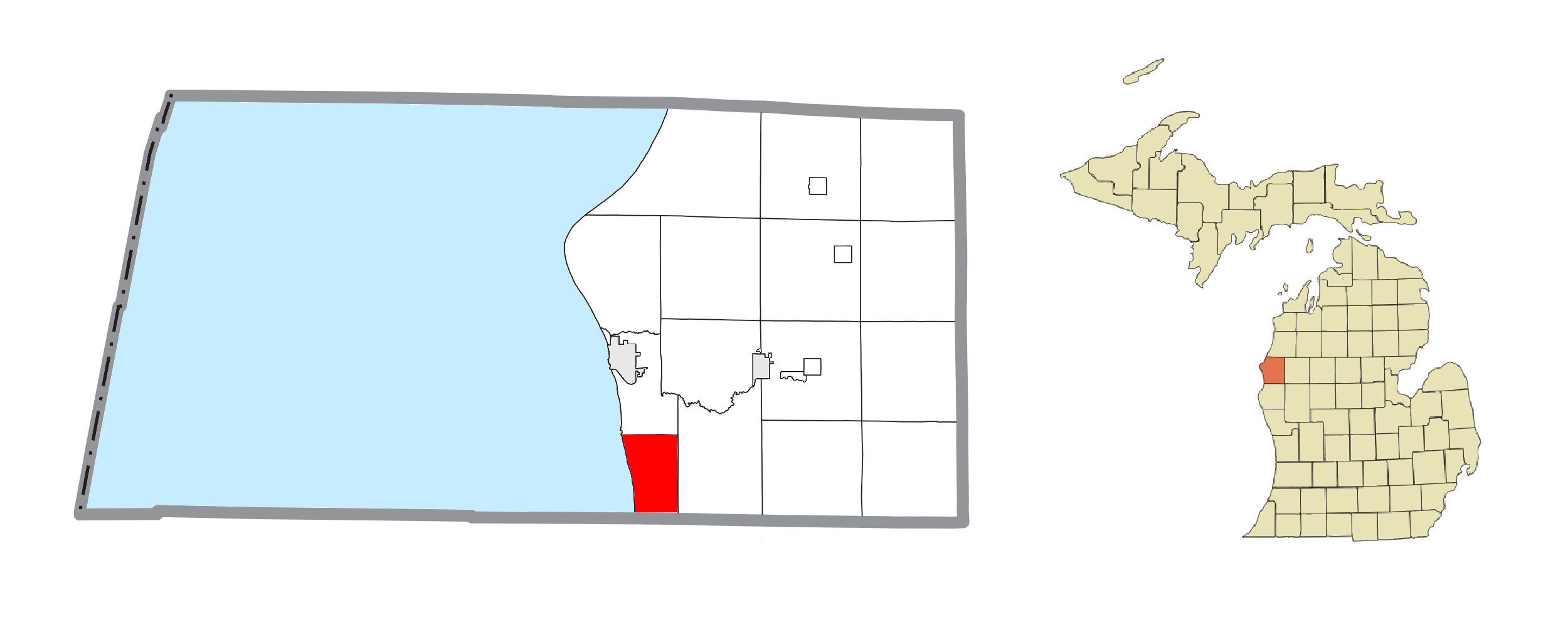
- Location within Mason County

- Location within the state of Michigan Location within the United States
- Coordinates: 43°50′52″N 86°24′54″W
- Country: United States
- State: Michigan
- County: Mason
- Established: 1860

Government
  - Supervisor: Donald Kelly
  - Clerk: Mary Bedker

Area
  - Total: 14.29 sq mi (37.0 km^{2})
  - Land: 12.80 sq mi (33.2 km^{2})
  - Water: 1.49 sq mi (3.9 km^{2})
- Elevation: 669 ft (204 m)

Population (2020)
  - Total: 995
  - Density: 77.7/sq mi (30.0/km^{2})
- Time zone: UTC-5 (Eastern (EST))
  - Summer (DST): UTC-4 (EDT)
- ZIP code(s): 49431 (Ludington); 49449 (Pentwater)
- Area code: 231
- FIPS code: 26-105-77220
- GNIS feature ID: 1627136
- Website: Official website

Summit Township is a civil township of Mason County in the U.S. state of Michigan. The population was 995 at the 2020 census.

== Communities ==
- Fairview is an unincorporated community in the township. It had a post office from 1860 until 1876.

== History ==
The township was organized in 1860. Some say Summit Township was named from its lofty elevation, while others believe it was named from the optimistic spirit of its organizers.

== Geography ==
Summit Township is in southwestern Mason County, bordered to the south by Oceana County and to the west by Lake Michigan. According to the United States Census Bureau, the township has a total area of 14.29 square miles (37.01 km^{2}), of which 12.80 square miles (33.15 km^{2}) are land and 1.49 square miles (3.86 km^{2}), or 10.43%, are water. Bass Lake is in the southern part of the township, and half of a large storage reservoir for the Ludington Pumped Storage Hydroelectric Plant is in the north.

U.S. Route 31, a four-lane freeway, crosses the township from north to south, leading north to just east of Ludington, the Mason county seat, and south to Muskegon.

== Demographics ==
As of the census of 2000, there were 1,021 people, 398 households, and 308 families residing in the township. The population density was 79.4 inhabitants per square mile (30.7/km^{2}). There were 790 housing units at an average density of 61.4 per square mile (23.7/km^{2}). The racial makeup of the township was 97.36% White, 0.10% African American, 0.59% Native American, 0.10% Asian, 0.10% Pacific Islander, 0.88% from other races, and 0.88% from two or more races. Hispanic or Latino of any race were 2.35% of the population.

There were 398 households, out of which 29.6% had children under the age of 18 living with them, 70.6% were married couples living together, 5.3% had a female householder with no husband present, and 22.4% were non-families. 18.6% of all households were made up of individuals, and 8.8% had someone living alone who was 65 years of age or older. The average household size was 2.56 and the average family size was 2.91.

In the township the population was spread out, with 22.7% under the age of 18, 5.4% from 18 to 24, 21.6% from 25 to 44, 29.6% from 45 to 64, and 20.7% who were 65 years of age or older. The median age was 45 years. For every 100 females, there were 105.8 males. For every 100 females age 18 and over, there were 100.8 males.

The median income for a household in the township was $44,432, and the median income for a family was $50,000. Males had a median income of $35,875 versus $23,625 for females. The per capita income for the township was $20,335. About 1.0% of families and 3.1% of the population were below the poverty line, including 0.8% of those under age 18 and 7.2% of those age 65 or over.
