= Amber Township, Michigan =

- Civil township
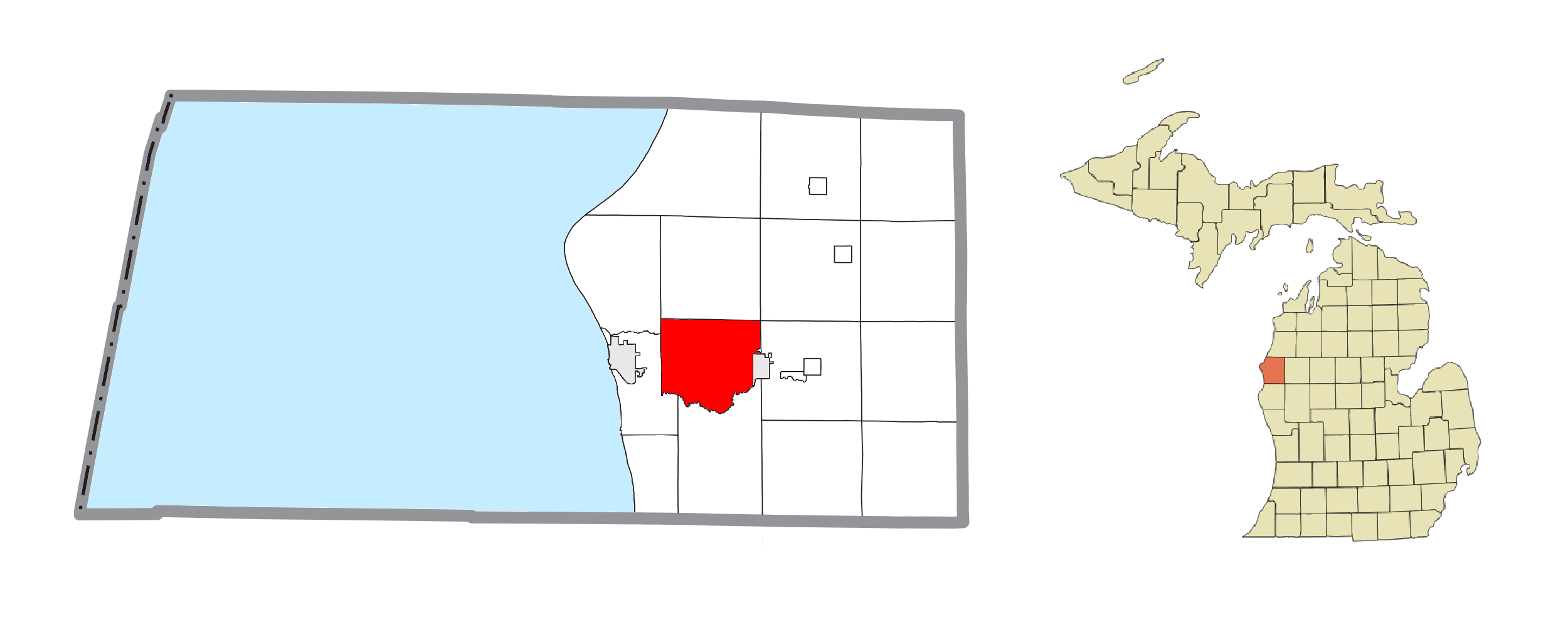
- Location within Mason County

- Location within Michigan Location within the United States
- Coordinates: 43°57′34″N 86°20′45″W
- Country: United States
- State: Michigan
- County: Mason
- Organized: 1867

Government
  - Supervisor: James Gallie
  - Clerk: Theresa Rohde

Area
  - Total: 27.76 sq mi (71.9 km^{2})
  - Land: 27.56 sq mi (71.4 km^{2})
  - Water: 0.20 sq mi (0.52 km^{2})
- Elevation: 673 ft (205 m)

Population (2020)
  - Total: 2,529
  - Density: 91.8/sq mi (35.4/km^{2})
- Time zone: UTC-5 (Eastern (EST))
  - Summer (DST): UTC-4 (EDT)
- ZIP Codes: 49431 (Ludington); 49454 (Scottville)
- Area code: 231
- FIPS code: 26-105-01980
- GNIS feature ID: 1625835
- Website: ambertwpmi.gov

Amber Township is a civil township of Mason County in the U.S. state of Michigan. As of the 2020 census, the township population was 2,529.

== History ==
Amber Township was organized in 1867. It was named after Amber, New York, the former home of an early resident.

== Geography ==
Amber Township is in western Mason County, with the city of Scottville on the township's eastern border. Ludington, the county seat, is less than 5 miles (8 km) to the west. The Pere Marquette River, a west-flowing tributary of Lake Michigan, forms the southern border of the township. U.S. Routes 10 and 31 cross the township together from east to west, with U.S. 31 turning north near the eastern edge of the township and turning south onto a four-lane freeway near the western edge.

According to the United States Census Bureau, the township has a total area of 27.76 square miles (71.90 km^{2}), of which 27.56 square miles (71.4 km^{2}) are land and 0.20 square miles (0.52 km^{2}), or 0.70%, are water.

== Demographics ==
As of the census of 2000, there were 2,054 people, 756 households, and 579 families residing in the township. The population density was 74.4 inhabitants per square mile (28.7/km^{2}). There were 820 housing units at an average density of 29.7 per square mile (11.5/km^{2}). The racial makeup of the township was 96.64% White, 0.54% African American, 0.68% Native American, 0.39% Asian, 0.10% Pacific Islander, 0.54% from other races, and 1.12% from two or more races. Hispanic or Latino of any race were 2.48% of the population.

There were 756 households, out of which 35.1% had children under the age of 18 living with them, 65.6% were married couples living together, 6.7% had a female householder with no husband present, and 23.4% were non-families. 19.4% of all households were made up of individuals, and 5.6% had someone living alone who was 65 years of age or older. The average household size was 2.64 and the average family size was 3.02.

In the township the population was spread out, with 25.8% under the age of 18, 6.6% from 18 to 24, 26.2% from 25 to 44, 26.2% from 45 to 64, and 15.1% who were 65 years of age or older. The median age was 40 years. For every 100 females, there were 105.6 males. For every 100 females age 18 and over, there were 102.4 males.

The median income for a household in the township was $43,458, and the median income for a family was $46,701. Males had a median income of $35,893 versus $21,842 for females. The per capita income for the township was $17,833. About 4.2% of families and 4.9% of the population were below the poverty line, including 4.7% of those under age 18 and 3.8% of those age 65 or over.
