= Eden Township, Polk County, Minnesota =

Eden Township, Minnesota
- Township
- Location of Eden Township, within Polk County, Minnesota
- Coordinates: 47°42′45″N 95°39′9″W
- Country: United States
- State: Minnesota
- County: Polk

Area
  - Total: 36.3 sq mi (93.9 km^{2})
  - Land: 35.1 sq mi (91.0 km^{2})
  - Water: 1.1 sq mi (2.9 km^{2})
- Elevation: 1,299 ft (396 m)

Population (2000)
  - Total: 215
  - Density: 6.2/sq mi (2.4/km^{2})
- Time zone: UTC-6 (Central (CST))
  - Summer (DST): UTC-5 (CDT)
- FIPS code: 27-18080
- GNIS feature ID: 0664043

Eden Township is a township in Polk County, Minnesota, United States. It is part of the Grand Forks-ND-MN Metropolitan Statistical Area. The population was 191 at the 2020 census.

The name is an allusion to the biblical Garden of Eden.

== Geography ==
According to the United States Census Bureau, the township has a total area of 36.2 square miles (94 km^{2}), of which 35.2 square miles (91 km^{2}) is land and 1.1 square miles (2.8 km^{2}) (3.03%) is water.

== Demographics ==
As of the census of 2000, there were 215 people, 83 households, and 62 families residing in the township. The population density was 6.1 inhabitants per square mile (2.4/km^{2}). There were 96 housing units at an average density of 2.7 per square mile (1.0/km^{2}). The racial makeup of the township was 96.28% White, 0.47% Native American, 2.79% from other races, and 0.47% from two or more races. Hispanic or Latino of any race were 2.79% of the population.

There were 83 households, out of which 32.5% had children under the age of 18 living with them, 62.7% were married couples living together, 7.2% had a female householder with no husband present, and 24.1% were non-families. 24.1% of all households were made up of individuals, and 12.0% had someone living alone who was 65 years of age or older. The average household size was 2.59 and the average family size was 3.06.

In the township the population was spread out, with 27.4% under the age of 18, 6.5% from 18 to 24, 23.7% from 25 to 44, 24.7% from 45 to 64, and 17.7% who were 65 years of age or older. The median age was 42 years. For every 100 females, there were 124.0 males. For every 100 females age 18 and over, there were 113.7 males.

The median income for a household in the township was $29,375, and the median income for a family was $32,500. Males had a median income of $24,063 versus $20,536 for females. The per capita income for the township was $11,713. About 10.0% of families and 15.9% of the population were below the poverty line, including 26.0% of those under the age of eighteen and 7.1% of those 65 or over.
