= Mason County, Michigan =

County in Michigan, United States

- County
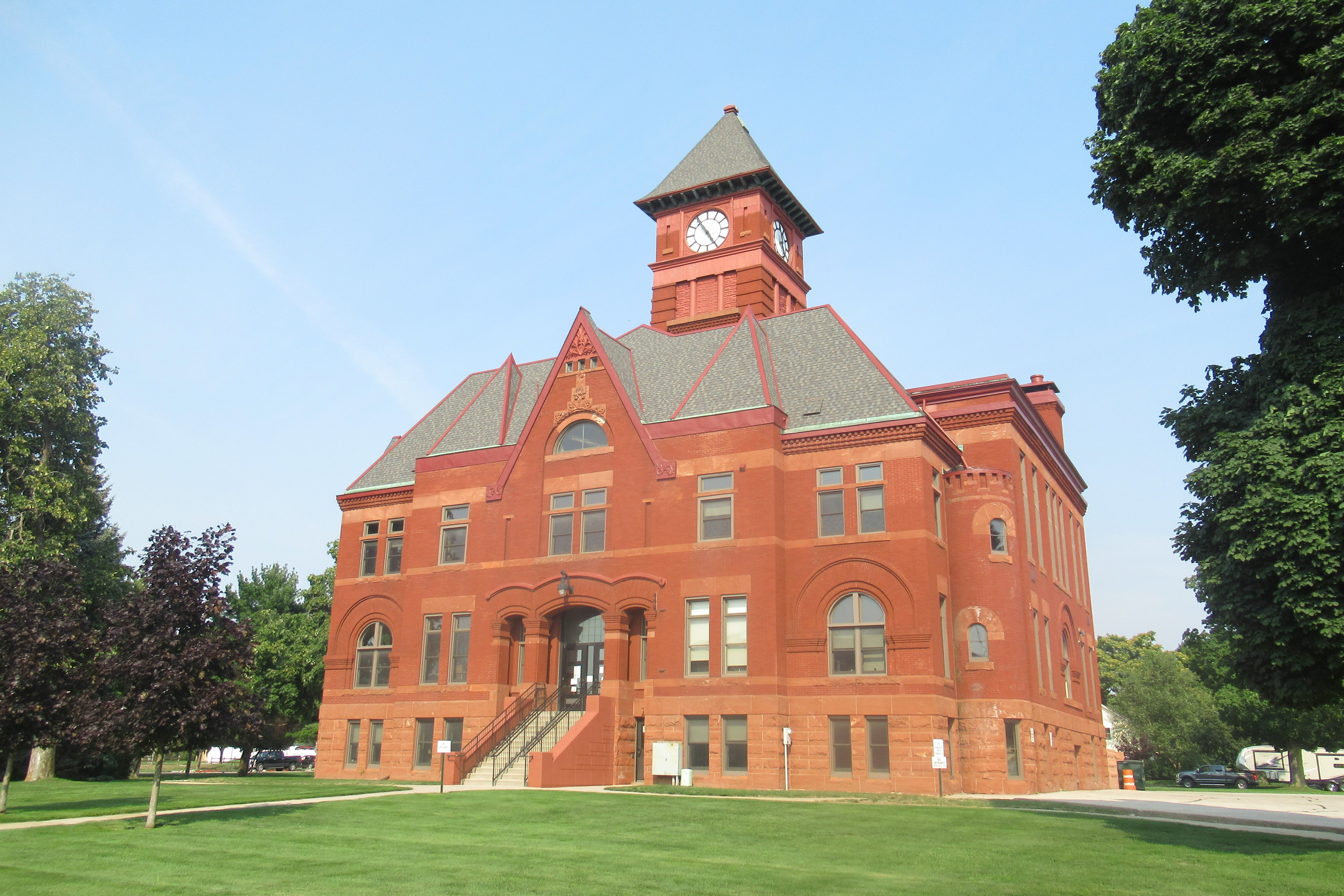
- Mason County Courthouse in Ludington

- Location within the U.S. state of Michigan
- Coordinates: 44°01′N 86°30′W
- Country: United States
- State: Michigan
- Founded: 1840 (founded as Notipekago); 1855 (organized)
- Named for: Stevens T. Mason
- Seat: Ludington
- Largest city: Ludington

Area
  - Total: 1,242 sq mi (3,220 km^{2})
  - Land: 495 sq mi (1,280 km^{2})
  - Water: 747 sq mi (1,930 km^{2}) 60%

Population (2020)
  - Total: 29,052
  - Estimate (2025): 29,040 ▼
  - Density: 58/sq mi (22/km^{2})
- Time zone: UTC−5 (Eastern)
  - Summer (DST): UTC−4 (EDT)
- Congressional district: 2nd
- Website: www.masoncounty.net

Mason County is a county located in the U.S. state of Michigan. As of the 2020 Census, the population was 29,052. The county seat is Ludington.

Mason County comprises the Ludington, MI Micropolitan Statistical Area.

== History ==
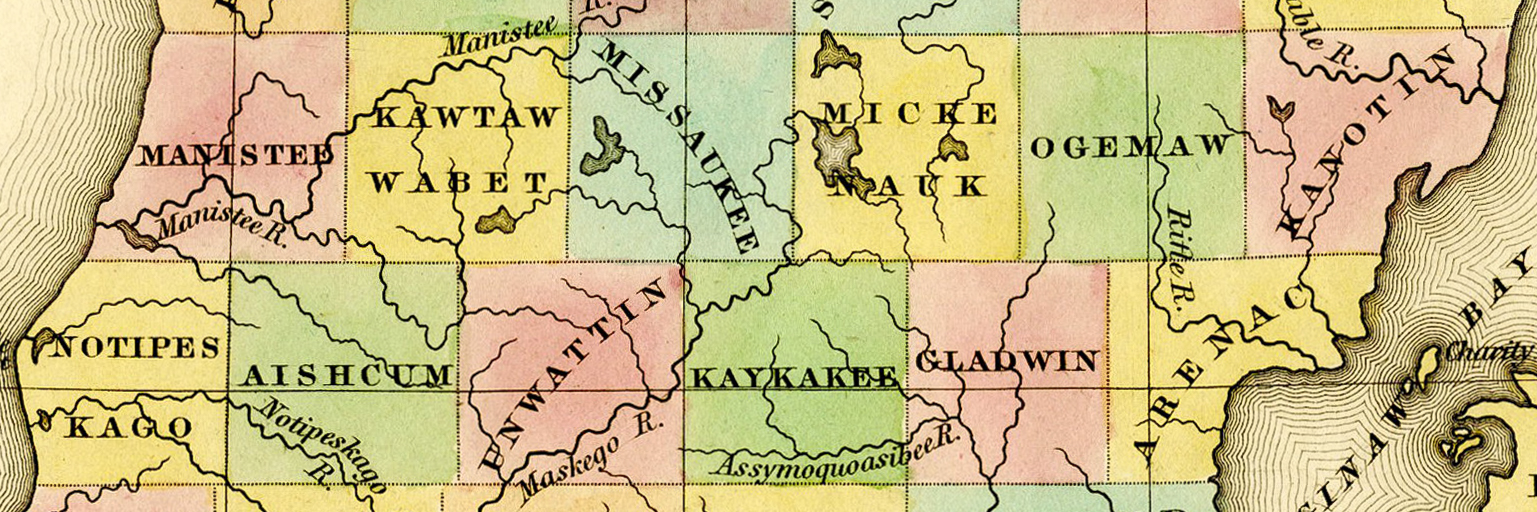
A detail from A New Map of Michigan with its Canals, Roads & Distances (1842) by Henry Schenck Tanner, showing Mason County as "Notipeskago" (a misspelling of Notipekago, the county's name from 1840 to 1843.) Several nearby counties are also shown with names that would later be changed.

The county is named for Stevens T. Mason, Governor of Michigan from 1835 to 1840. It was created by the Michigan Legislature in 1840 as Notipekago County, then renamed Mason County in 1843. The county was administered by Ottawa County prior to the organization of county government in 1855.

== Geography ==
According to the US Census Bureau, the county has a total area of 1,242 square miles (3,220 km^{2}), of which 495 square miles (1,280 km^{2}) is land and 747 square miles (1,930 km^{2}) (60%) is water.

=== Major highways ===
- US 10 – runs east–west through central part of county. Runs from Ludington through Amber, Scottville, Custer, and Branch.
- US 31 – enters Mason County at 2 miles (3.2 km) east of SW corner; runs north to intersect US-10 near Ludington. Runs concurrent with US-10 east for 5 miles (8.0 km), then runs north. Exits county at 4 miles (6.4 km) east of NW corner of county.
- M-116 – runs NW from Ludington along shoreline of Lake Michigan to Ludington State Park.
- Bus. US 31 is a business spur running east of Ludington.

=== U.S. Bicycle Routes ===
- USBR 35 enters Mason County from Pentwater; has a concurrency with USBR 20; proceeds north into Manistee County
- USBR 20 begins (until near future) at SS Badger with US 10; has a concurrency with USBR 35; goes through Freesoil; proceeds east into Lake County; proceeds east for about 310 miles to Marine City

=== Adjacent counties ===
By land

- Manistee County – north
- Lake County – east
- Newaygo County – southeast
- Oceana County – south

By water

- Sheboygan County, Wisconsin – southwest
- Manitowoc County, Wisconsin – west

=== National protected area ===
- Manistee National Forest (part)

== Demographics ==
Historical population
Census	Pop.	Note	%±
1850	93		—
1860	831		793.5%
1870	3,263		292.7%
1880	10,065		208.5%
1890	16,385		62.8%
1900	18,885		15.3%
1910	21,832		15.6%
1920	19,831		−9.2%
1930	18,756		−5.4%
1940	19,378		3.3%
1950	20,474		5.7%
1960	21,929		7.1%
1970	22,612		3.1%
1980	26,365		16.6%
1990	25,537		−3.1%
2000	28,274		10.7%
2010	28,705		1.5%
2020	29,052		1.2%
2025 (est.)	29,040	▼	0.0%
US Decennial Census; 1790–1960 1900–1990; 1990–2000 2010–2018

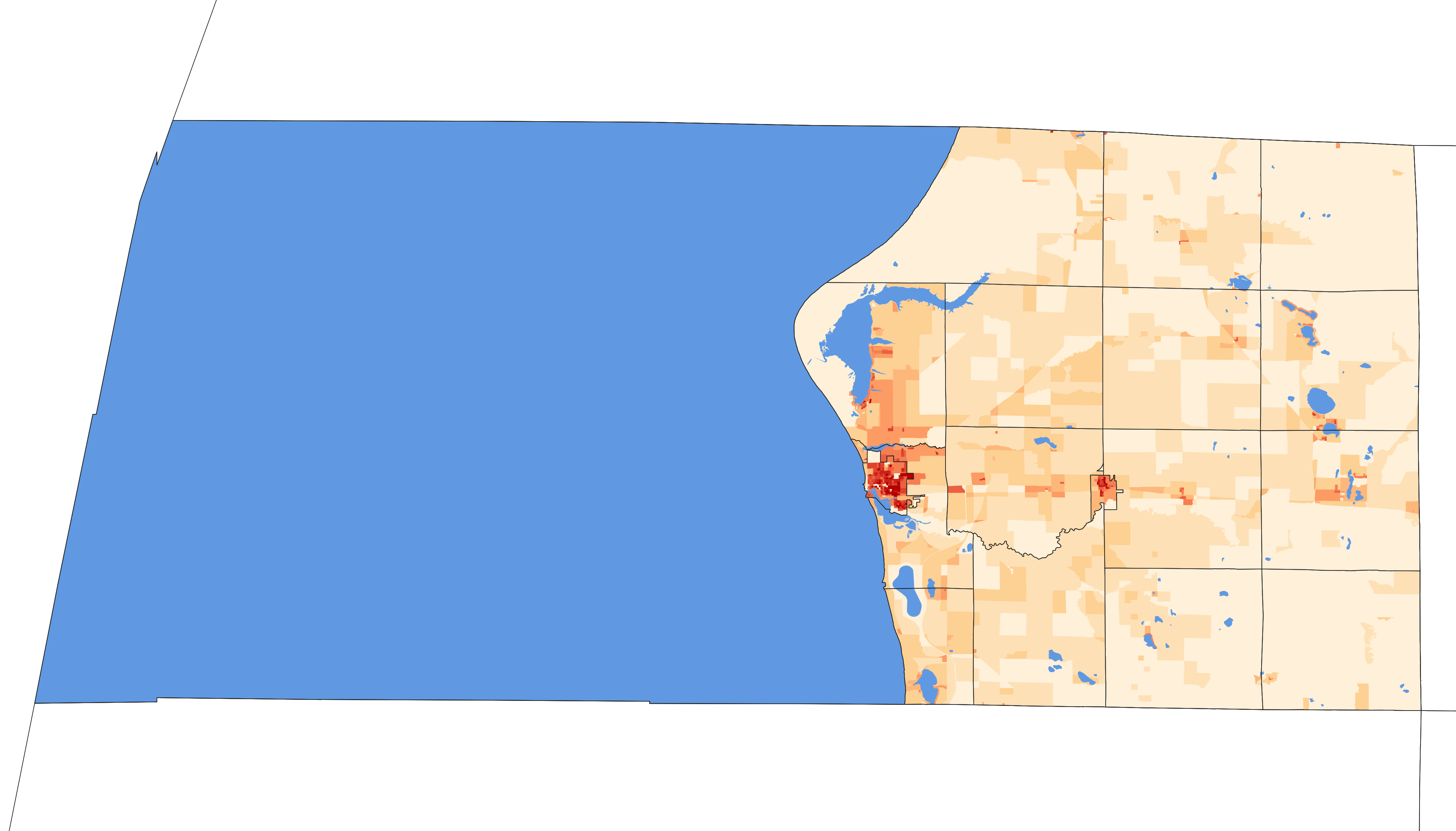
2020 population density of Mason County MI by census block

=== Racial and ethnic comosition ===
Mason County, Michigan – Racial and ethnic composition Note: the US Census treats Hispanic/Latino as an ethnic category. This table excludes Latinos from the racial categories and assigns them to a separate category. Hispanics/Latinos may be of any race.
Race / Ethnicity (NH = Non-Hispanic)	Pop 1980	Pop 1990	Pop 2000	Pop 2010	Pop 2020	% 1980	% 1990	% 2000	% 2010	% 2020
White alone (NH)	25,534	24,731	26,576	26,595	25,944	96.85%	96.84%	93.99%	92.65%	89.30%
Black or African American alone (NH)	177	152	200	156	167	0.67%	0.60%	0.71%	0.54%	0.57%
Native American or Alaska Native alone (NH)	169	177	211	254	219	0.64%	0.69%	0.75%	0.88%	0.75%
Asian alone (NH)	93	75	78	130	154	0.35%	0.29%	0.28%	0.45%	0.53%
Native Hawaiian or Pacific Islander alone (NH)	x	x	5	0	8	x	x	0.02%	0.00%	0.03%
Other race alone (NH)	22	3	13	11	81	0.08%	0.01%	0.05%	0.04%	0.28%
Mixed race or Multiracial (NH)	x	x	339	409	1,189	x	x	1.20%	1.42%	4.09%
Hispanic or Latino (any race)	370	399	852	1,150	1,290	1.40%	1.56%	3.01%	4.01%	4.44%
Total	26,365	25,537	28,274	28,705	29,052	100.00%	100.00%	100.00%	100.00%	100.00%

=== 2020 census ===
As of the 2020 census, the county had a population of 29,052 and a median age of 47.6 years. 19.9% of residents were under the age of 18 and 25.2% of residents were 65 years of age or older. For every 100 females there were 98.5 males, and for every 100 females age 18 and over there were 96.8 males age 18 and over.

The racial makeup of the county was 91.1% White, 0.6% Black or African American, 0.8% American Indian and Alaska Native, 0.5% Asian, <0.1% Native Hawaiian and Pacific Islander, 1.4% from some other race, and 5.5% from two or more races. Hispanic or Latino residents of any race comprised 4.4% of the population.

40.9% of residents lived in urban areas, while 59.1% lived in rural areas.

There were 12,319 households in the county, of which 24.3% had children under the age of 18 living in them. Of all households, 50.2% were married-couple households, 18.8% were households with a male householder and no spouse or partner present, and 23.6% were households with a female householder and no spouse or partner present. About 29.9% of all households were made up of individuals and 15.3% had someone living alone who was 65 years of age or older.

There were 17,392 housing units, of which 29.2% were vacant. Among occupied housing units, 78.1% were owner-occupied and 21.9% were renter-occupied. The homeowner vacancy rate was 1.6% and the rental vacancy rate was 11.8%.

=== 2000 census ===
As of the 2000 United States census, there were 28,274 people, 11,406 households, and 7,881 families in the county. The population density was 57 people per square mile (22 people/km^{2}). There were 16,063 housing units at an average density of 32 per square mile (12/km^{2}). The racial makeup of the county was 95.84% White, 0.73% Black or African American, 0.78% Native American, 0.28% Asian, 0.02% Pacific Islander, 0.82% from other races, and 1.53% from two or more races. 3.01% of the population were Hispanic or Latino of any race. 24.5% were of German, 10.4% Polish, 8.8% English, 8.5% Irish, 7.7% American and 5.0% Swedish ancestry. 96.0% spoke only English, while 2.2% spoke Spanish at home.

There were 11,406 households, out of which 29.70% had children under the age of 18 living with them, 56.40% were married couples living together, 9.20% had a female householder with no husband present, and 30.90% were non-families. 26.50% of all households were made up of individuals, and 11.70% had someone living alone who was 65 years of age or older. The average household size was 2.43 and the average family size was 2.92.

The county population contained 24.20% under the age of 18, 7.10% from 18 to 24, 26.20% from 25 to 44, 25.80% from 45 to 64, and 16.80% who were 65 years of age or older. The median age was 40 years. For every 100 females there were 97.50 males. For every 100 females age 18 and over, there were 94.40 males.

The median income for a household in the county was $34,704, and the median income for a family was $41,654. Males had a median income of $33,873 versus $22,616 for females. The per capita income for the county was $17,713. About 8.20% of families and 11.00% of the population were below the poverty line, including 16.50% of those under age 18 and 7.00% of those age 65 or over.

== Government ==
Mason County has usually voted Republican in national elections. Since 1884, the county's voters have selected the Republican Party nominee in 83% (30 of 36) of the national elections through 2024.

United States presidential election results for Mason County, Michigan
Year	Republican		Democratic		Third party(ies)	
Year	No.	%	No.	%	No.	%
1884	1,299	50.49%	1,217	47.30%	57	2.22%
1888	1,697	50.79%	1,573	47.08%	71	2.13%
1892	1,426	45.85%	1,383	44.47%	301	9.68%
1896	2,177	56.27%	1,580	40.84%	112	2.89%
1900	2,185	61.31%	1,251	35.10%	128	3.59%
1904	2,394	72.13%	764	23.02%	161	4.85%
1908	2,577	65.71%	1,132	28.86%	213	5.43%
1912	844	21.51%	1,073	27.34%	2,007	51.15%
1916	2,198	53.17%	1,689	40.86%	247	5.97%
1920	3,652	69.39%	1,338	25.42%	273	5.19%
1924	3,567	67.18%	815	15.35%	928	17.48%
1928	4,318	72.74%	1,567	26.40%	51	0.86%
1932	3,098	42.48%	3,854	52.85%	340	4.66%
1936	3,224	39.37%	4,598	56.14%	368	4.49%
1940	4,874	55.62%	3,836	43.77%	53	0.60%
1944	4,446	58.27%	3,137	41.11%	47	0.62%
1948	4,147	55.99%	2,988	40.34%	272	3.67%
1952	6,179	64.65%	3,298	34.51%	81	0.85%
1956	6,142	65.15%	3,274	34.73%	12	0.13%
1960	6,011	58.21%	4,305	41.69%	10	0.10%
1964	3,842	39.02%	5,993	60.87%	11	0.11%
1968	5,311	54.02%	3,660	37.23%	860	8.75%
1972	6,811	63.57%	3,697	34.50%	207	1.93%
1976	6,812	59.15%	4,541	39.43%	163	1.42%
1980	7,137	58.14%	4,134	33.68%	1,005	8.19%
1984	8,202	67.83%	3,803	31.45%	87	0.72%
1988	6,800	59.58%	4,531	39.70%	82	0.72%
1992	5,102	39.00%	4,829	36.91%	3,151	24.09%
1996	5,066	41.35%	5,597	45.69%	1,588	12.96%
2000	7,066	54.29%	5,579	42.86%	371	2.85%
2004	8,124	55.60%	6,333	43.34%	154	1.05%
2008	7,147	46.89%	7,817	51.29%	277	1.82%
2012	7,580	51.69%	6,856	46.75%	229	1.56%
2016	8,505	57.50%	5,281	35.70%	1,006	6.80%
2020	10,207	59.06%	6,802	39.36%	274	1.59%
2024	10,830	59.95%	6,973	38.60%	261	1.44%

United States Senate election results for Mason County, Michigan1
Year	Republican		Democratic		Third party(ies)	
Year	No.	%	No.	%	No.	%
2024	10,613	59.43%	6,739	37.74%	505	2.83%

Michigan Gubernatorial election results for Mason County
Year	Republican		Democratic		Third party(ies)	
Year	No.	%	No.	%	No.	%
2022	8,018	54.32%	6,419	43.49%	324	2.19%

Mason County operates the county jail, maintains rural roads, operates the major local courts, records deeds, mortgages, and vital records, administers public health regulations, and participates with the state in the provision of social services. The county board of commissioners controls the budget and has limited authority to make laws or ordinances. In Michigan, most local government functions – police and fire, building and zoning, tax assessment, street maintenance etc. – are the responsibility of individual cities and townships.

=== Elected officials ===
- Prosecuting Attorney: Beth Hand
- Sheriff: Kim C. Cole
- County Clerk: Cheryl Kelly
- County Treasurer: Andrew Kmetz IV
- Register of Deeds: Diane L. Englebrecht
- Drain Commissioner: Larry Protasiewicz
- County Surveyor: Jim Nordlund
- County Board of Commissioners by district:
  - District 1: Nick Kreiger
  - District 2: Les Johnson
  - District 3: Jody Hartley
  - District 4: Lewis G. Squires
  - District 5: Steven K. Hull
  - District 6: Janet S. Anderson (chair)
  - District 7: Ron Bacon

(information as of Jan 2021)

== Communities ==
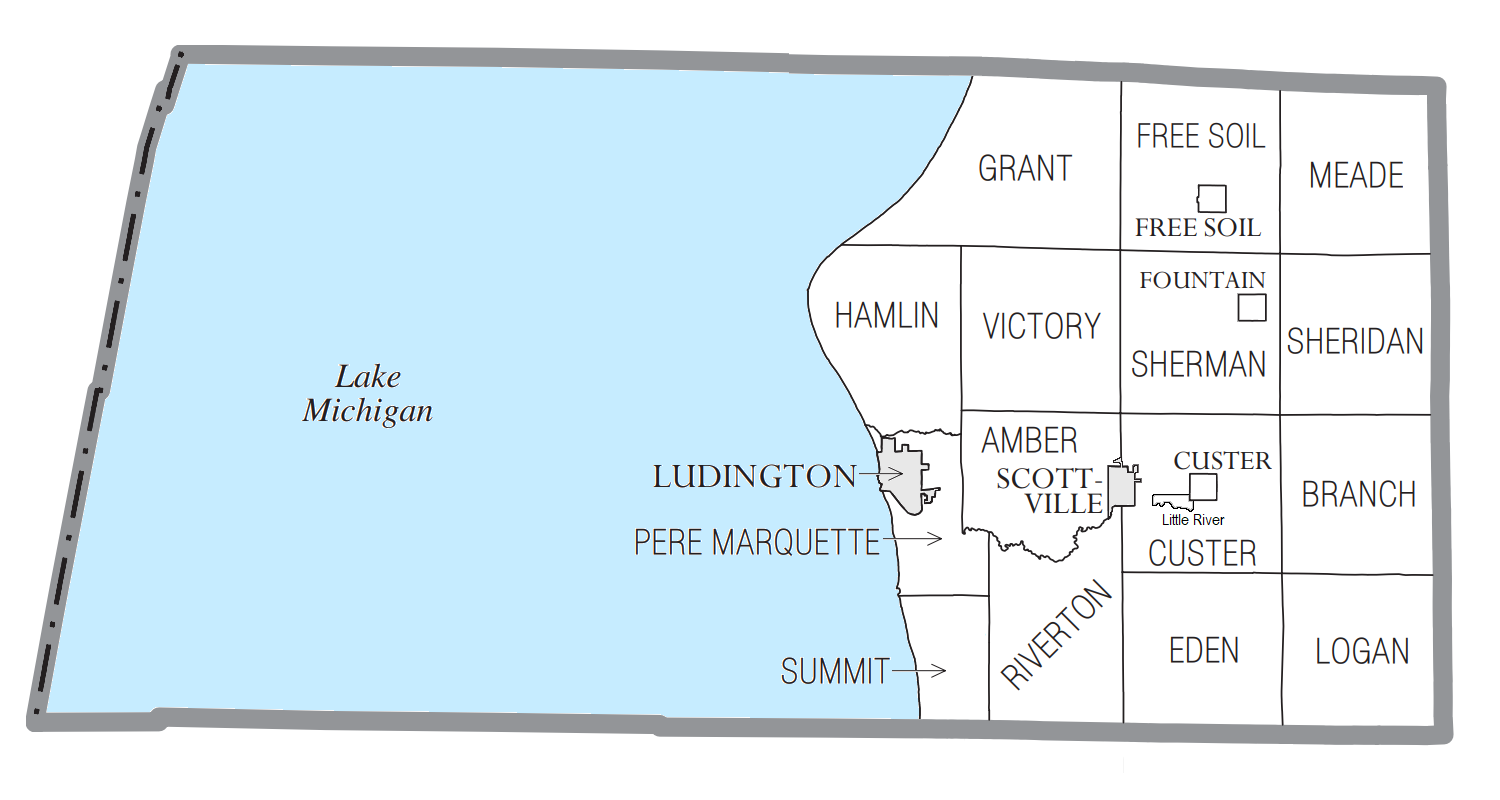
U.S. Census data map showing local municipal boundaries within Mason County. Shaded areas represent incorporated cities.

=== Cities ===
- Ludington (county seat)
- Scottville

=== Villages ===
- Custer
- Fountain
- Free Soil

=== Charter township ===
- Pere Marquette Charter Township

=== Civil townships ===
- Amber Township
- Branch Township
- Custer Township
- Eden Township
- Free Soil Township
- Grant Township
- Hamlin Township
- Logan Township
- Meade Township
- Riverton Township
- Sheridan Township
- Sherman Township
- Summit Township
- Victory Township

=== Unincorporated communities ===
- Branch (partially)
- Chapple Corners
- Fairview
- Fern
- Ferryville
- Tallman
- Walhalla

=== Indian reservation ===
- The Little River Band of Ottawa Indians, a federally recognized Odawa Native American tribe, occupies a small reservation of approximately 740 acres (2.99 km^{2}) within Custer Township. The tribe also occupy another reservation within Brown Township just north in Manistee County.

== Education ==
The West Shore Educational Service District, based in Ludington, services the districts in the county along with those of Lake and Oceana. The intermediate school district offers regional special education and general education services, as well as technical career programs for its students.

Mason County is served by the following regular public school districts:

- Ludington Area School District
- Mason County Central Schools
- Mason County Eastern Schools

The county also has one charter school, the Gateway to Success Academy.

Mason County has the following private schools:

- Covenant Christian School (Non-denominational)
- Ludington Area Catholic School (Catholic)

== See also ==
- List of Michigan State Historic Sites in Mason County
- Mason County Courthouse
- Mason County District Library
- National Register of Historic Places listings in Mason County, Michigan
