= Eden Township, Mason County, Michigan =

Eden Township, Michigan
- Civil township
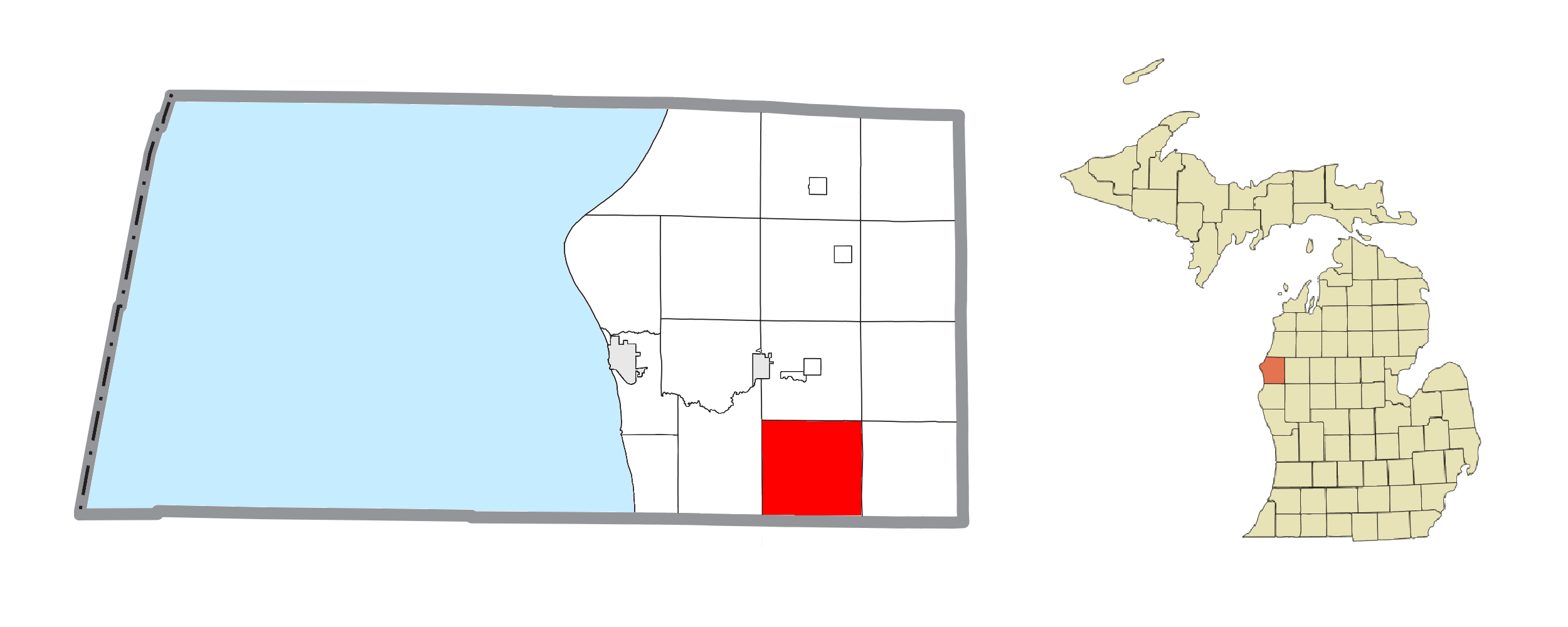
- Location within Mason County

- Location within Michigan Location within the United States
- Coordinates: 43°51′40″N 86°13′50″W
- Country: United States
- State: Michigan
- County: Mason
- Organized: 1878

Government
  - Supervisor: Roger Nash
  - Clerk: Julie Van Dyke

Area
  - Total: 35.87 sq mi (92.9 km^{2})
  - Land: 35.41 sq mi (91.7 km^{2})
  - Water: 0.46 sq mi (1.2 km^{2})
- Elevation: 732 ft (223 m)

Population (2020)
  - Total: 580
  - Density: 16.4/sq mi (6.3/km^{2})
- Time zone: UTC-5 (Eastern (EST))
  - Summer (DST): UTC-4 (EDT)
- ZIP Codes: 49405 (Custer); 49454 (Scottville)
- Area code: 231
- FIPS code: 26-105-24820
- GNIS feature ID: 1626217
- Website: edentownshipmi.org

Eden Township is a civil township of Mason County in the U.S. state of Michigan. The population was 580 at the 2020 census.

Organized in 1878, Eden Township was named after the Garden of Eden.

== Geography ==
The township is in southern Mason County and is bordered to the south by Oceana County. According to the United States Census Bureau, the township has a total area of 35.87 square miles (92.90 km^{2}), of which 35.41 square miles (91.71 km^{2}) are land and 0.46 square miles (1.19 km^{2}), or 1.27%, are water.

== Communities ==
- Fern is an unincorporated community in the township. The community was named for the abundant ferns near the original town site. It started around a sawmill. It got a station on the Mason and Oceana Railroad in 1886 and had a post office from 1888 until 1907.
- Ferryville is an unincorporated community in the township. It was first settled in 1875.

== Demographics ==
As of the census of 2000, there were 555 people, 200 households, and 149 families residing in the township. The population density was 15.7 inhabitants per square mile (6.1/km^{2}). There were 344 housing units at an average density of 9.7 per square mile (3.7/km^{2}). The racial makeup of the township was 97.30% White, 0.36% African American, 0.54% Native American, 0.18% Asian, and 1.62% from two or more races. Hispanic or Latino of any race were 2.70% of the population.

There were 200 households, out of which 29.0% had children under the age of 18 living with them, 66.0% were married couples living together, 5.0% had a female householder with no husband present, and 25.5% were non-families. 20.5% of all households were made up of individuals, and 9.5% had someone living alone who was 65 years of age or older. The average household size was 2.68 and the average family size was 3.12.

In the township the population was spread out, with 25.6% under the age of 18, 6.5% from 18 to 24, 27.9% from 25 to 44, 25.6% from 45 to 64, and 14.4% who were 65 years of age or older. The median age was 39 years. For every 100 females, there were 109.4 males. For every 100 females age 18 and over, there were 111.8 males.

The median income for a household in the township was $36,985, and the median income for a family was $40,357. Males had a median income of $30,625 versus $22,500 for females. The per capita income for the township was $13,488. About 8.0% of families and 10.5% of the population were below the poverty line, including 6.1% of those under age 18 and 11.3% of those age 65 or over.
