= Eden Township, Pipestone County, Minnesota =

Eden Township, Minnesota
- Township
- Location within the state of Minnesota Eden Township, Minnesota (the United States)
- Coordinates: 43°53′48″N 96°22′47″W
- Country: United States
- State: Minnesota
- County: Pipestone

Area
  - Total: 43.0 sq mi (111.4 km^{2})
  - Land: 42.9 sq mi (111.0 km^{2})
  - Water: 0.15 sq mi (0.4 km^{2})
- Elevation: 1,621 ft (494 m)

Population (2000)
  - Total: 294
  - Density: 6.7/sq mi (2.6/km^{2})
- Time zone: UTC-6 (Central (CST))
  - Summer (DST): UTC-5 (CDT)
- FIPS code: 27-18062
- GNIS feature ID: 0664042

Eden Township is a township in Pipestone County, Minnesota, United States. The population was 294 at the 2000 census.

Eden Township was organized in 1879, and the name, an allusion to the Garden of Eden, is descriptive.

== Geography ==
According to the United States Census Bureau, the township has a total area of 43.0 square miles (111 km^{2}), of which 42.9 square miles (111 km^{2}) is land and 0.2 square miles (0.52 km^{2}) is water.

== Demographics ==
As of the census of 2000, there were 294 people, 98 households, and 79 families residing in the township. The population density was 6.9 inhabitants per square mile (2.7/km^{2}). There were 103 housing units at an average density of 2.4 per square mile (0.93/km^{2}). The racial makeup of the township was 98.64% White, and 1.36% from two or more races.

There were 98 households, out of which 41.8% had children under the age of 18 living with them, 75.5% were married couples living together, 2.0% had a female householder with no husband present, and 18.4% were non-families. 14.3% of all households were made up of individuals, and 8.2% had someone living alone who was 65 years of age or older. The average household size was 3.00 and the average family size was 3.34.

In the township the population was spread out, with 35.0% under the age of 18, 4.4% from 18 to 24, 26.9% from 25 to 44, 21.1% from 45 to 64, and 12.6% who were 65 years of age or older. The median age was 35 years. For every 100 females, there were 98.6 males. For every 100 females age 18 and over, there were 103.2 males.

The median income for a household in the township was $42,813, and the median income for a family was $44,063. Males had a median income of $24,063 versus $21,875 for females. The per capita income for the township was $13,603. About 3.5% of families and 6.0% of the population were below the poverty line, including 6.9% of those under the age of eighteen and 4.9% of those 65 or over.

== Politics ==
Eden Township is located in Minnesota's 1st congressional district, represented by Mankato educator Tim Walz, a Democrat. At the state level, Eden Township is located in Senate District 22, represented by Republican Doug Magnus, and in House District 22A, represented by Republican Joe Schomacker.
