= Lincoln River =

River in Mason County

Coordinates: 43°59′02″N 86°28′19″W

Location
- Country: United States

Physical characteristics
- Source
  - location: Michigan

The Lincoln River is a 7.8-mile-long (12.6 km) river in Mason County, Michigan, in the United States. It is formed by the confluence of its North and South branches 5 miles (8 km) northeast of Ludington and flows westward to Lake Michigan. Part of Lincoln river runs through a small private community called epworth

== See also ==
- List of rivers of Michigan
