= Pleasant Plains =

Pleasant Plains may refer to several places in the United States of America:

- Pleasant Plains, Arkansas
- Pleasant Plains, Illinois
- Pleasant Plains, New Jersey
- Pleasant Plains, Dutchess County, New York
- Pleasant Plains, Staten Island, New York
  - Pleasant Plains (Staten Island Railway station)
- Pleasant Plains, Washington, D.C.
- Pleasant Plains Township, Michigan

== See also ==
- Pleasant Plain (disambiguation)
