= Baldwin River (Michigan) =

Location
- Country: United States

Physical characteristics
- Source
  - location: Lake County, Michigan
- Mouth
  - location: Pere Marquette River
  - elevation: 817 ft (249 m)

The Baldwin River is a 25.2-mile-long (40.6 km) stream in the U.S. state of Michigan.

The river rises out of Wide Waters on the southern edge of the Baldwin Luther Swamp in Newkirk Township, Lake County at . Several tributaries rise in the hills to the east of the swamp, and one stream labeled as the Baldwin River on USGS topographic maps rises in section 23 just southwest of the village of Luther.

The river flows south into Cherry Valley Township then to the southwest into the village of Baldwin, where it is joined by Sanborn Creek. The GNIS entry for Baldwin River records the mouth as being on the Sanborn Creek at . However, USGS topographic maps show the stream continuing southwest into the Pere Marquette River labeled as both the Baldwin River and Sanborn Creek. The GNIS entry for Sanborn Creek indicates it is also known as the Baldwin River. The stream empties into the Pere Marquette at and thence into Lake Michigan.

The river is notable in American history as the location of the first introduction of brown trout (Salmo trutta) into U.S. waters when on April 11, 1884 the U.S. Fish Commission released 4900 brown trout fry from the Northville, Michigan fish hatchery into the river.

== Tributaries ==
From the mouth on the Pere Marquette River:

- (right) Sanborn Creek
  - (right) Foreman Lakes
- (right Leverentz Lake
- (right) Cole Creek
  - (right) South Branch Cole Creek
  - (left) North Branch Cole Creek
    - Big Spring
- Wide Waters
- Baldwin Luther Swamp
