= Pere Marquette River =

River in Michigan, United States

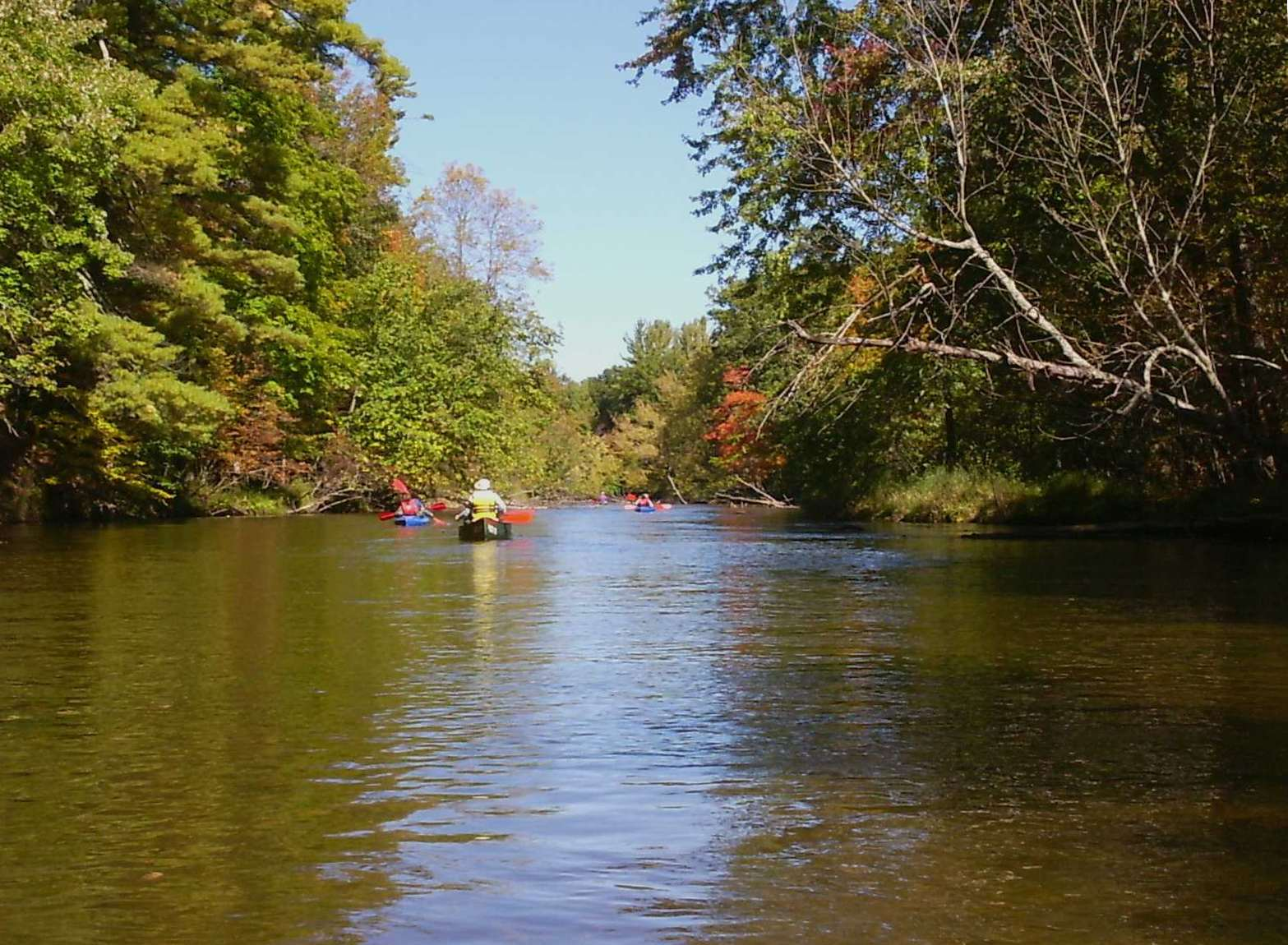
- Tourists canoeing on the Pere Marquette River in the Manistee National Forest

Location
- Country: United States
- State: Michigan
- Counties: Lake, Mason, Newaygo, Oceana
- Cities: Ludington, Scottville

Physical characteristics
- Source
  - location: Lake County, Michigan, United States
  - coordinates: 43°51′22″N 85°50′30″W
- Mouth: Lake Michigan
  - location: Ludington, Michigan, United States
  - coordinates: 43°57′06″N 86°27′37″W
- Length: 64 mi (103 km)
- Basin size: 740 sq mi (1,900 km^{2})

Basin features
- Tributaries
  - left: Little South Branch, Big South Branch
  - right: Middle Branch, Baldwin River

National Wild and Scenic River
- Type: Scenic
- Designated: November 10, 1978

The Pere Marquette River is a river in Michigan in the United States. The main stream of this river is 63.9 miles (102.8 km) long, running from Lake County south of Baldwin into the Pere Marquette Lake, and from there into Lake Michigan.

This river is named after the French Roman Catholic missionary Jacques Marquette, who explored the Great Lakes and Mississippi River areas during the mid-17th century. He died in the vicinity of the river in spring 1675 on his way from Chicago to the French fort at Mackinaw.

== National Wild and Scenic River designation ==
The upper portion of the Pere Marquette runs approximately 44 miles (71 km) from the forks of the Little South and Middle Branches downstream to highway M-37. In 1978, 66 miles (106 km) of the river was designated a National Scenic River. This section begins near Baldwin at the junction of the Little South and Middle Branches and continues until the river meets U.S. Highway 31 in Scottville.

== Sport fishing ==
The Pere Marquette River is designated a Blue Ribbon fishery.

== Wildlife ==
This river's original native fish was the Grayling, but due to deforestation after the great Chicago Fire, they disappeared from the river. It was then stocked with rainbow trout in 1876. In 1884, the Baldwin River, a major tributary, became the first American river to ever be stocked with European brown trout fish, which were imported from Germany, and is why they are referred to by some as German brown trout.

=== Other animal species living along this river ===
- Chinook salmon, successfully introduced in the 1960s
- Coho salmon
- Steelhead
- Brook trout
- Western chorus frog
- Bullfrog
- Crayfish
- Northern leopard frog
- Mudpuppy
- Eastern tiger salamander and several other species of salamander
- Northern water snake
- Copper-bellied water snake
- Common snapping turtle
- Red-eared slider
- Five-lined skink
- Muskrat
- Mink
- Beaver
- Weasel
- Wood duck
- New Zealand mud snail, an invasive species
- North American river otter

== Crossings ==
List of Bridge Crossings
Route	Type	City	County	Location
US 31	US Route	Ludington	Mason	
US 31	US Route	Ludington	Mason	
South Main Street	City Street	Scottville	Mason	
South Custer Road	City Street		Mason	
South Reek Road	County Road		Mason	
South Walhalla Road	County Road		Mason	
South Landon Road	County Road		Mason	
South Branch Road	County Road		Lake	
W 56th Street	County Road		Lake	
M-37	Michigan Highway		Lake	
