= Pleasant Plain =

Pleasant Plain may refer to:

- Pleasant Plain, Indiana
- Pleasant Plain, Iowa
- Pleasant Plain, Ohio

== See also ==
- Pleasant Plains (disambiguation)
