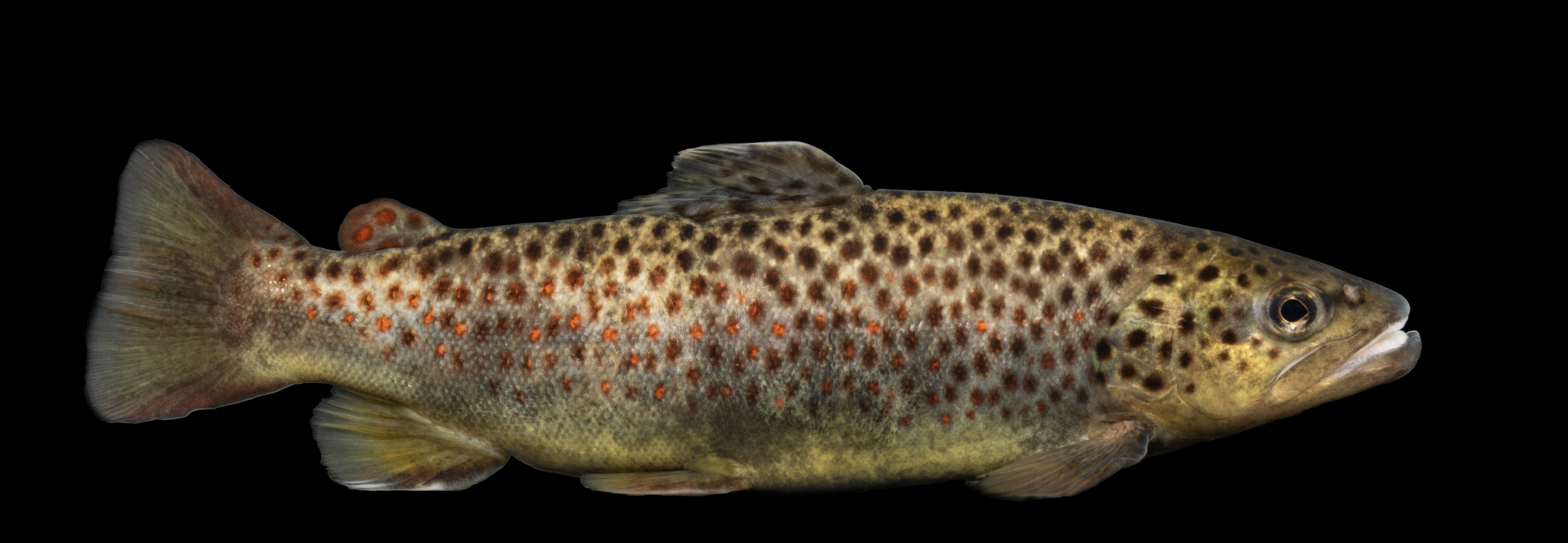

Conservation status
- Least Concern (IUCN 3.1)

Scientific classification
- Kingdom: Animalia
- Phylum: Chordata
- Class: Actinopterygii
- Division: Teleostei
- Order: Salmoniformes
- Family: Salmonidae
- Genus: Salmo
- Species: S. trutta

Binomial name
- Salmo trutta Linnaeus, 1758

Morphs
- Salmo trutta morpha trutta Salmo trutta morpha fario Salmo trutta morpha lacustris

Synonyms
- List: Trutta fluviatilis (Duhamel, 1771); Trutta salmonata (Rutty, 1772); Fario trutta (Linnaeus, 1758); Salmo trutta trutta (Linnaeus, 1758); Trutta trutta (Linnaeus, 1758); Salmo fario (Linnaeus, 1758); Salmo trutta fario (Linnaeus, 1758); Trutta fario (Linnaeus, 1758); Salmo lacustris (Linnaeus, 1758); Fario lacustris (Linnaeus, 1758); Salmo trutta lacustris (Linnaeus, 1758); Salmo eriox (Linnaeus, 1758); Trutta lacustris (Linnaeus, 1758); Trutta marina (Duhamel, 1771); Salmo illanca (Wartmann, 1783); Trutta salmanata (Strøm, 1784); Salmo albus (Bonnaterre, 1788); Salmo stroemii (Gmelin, 1789); Salmo sylvaticus (Gmelin, 1789); Salmo cornubiensis (Walbaum, 1792); Salmo fario loensis (Walbaum, 1792); Salmo albus (Walbaum, 1792); Salmo saxatilis (Schrank, 1798); Salmo fario var. forestensis (Bloch & Schneider, 1801); Salmo faris var. forestensis (Bloch & Schneider, 1801); Salmo cumberland (Lacepède, 1803); Salmo gadoides (Lacepède, 1803); Salmo phinoc (Shaw, 1804); Salmo cambricus (Donovan, 1806); Salmo taurinus (Walker, 1812); Salmo montana (Walker, 1812); Salmo spurius (Pallas, 1814); Salmo lemanus (Cuvier, 1829); Salmo truttula (Nilsson, 1832); Salmo caecifer (Parnell, 1838); Salmo levenensis (Yarrell, 1839); Salmo orientalis (McClelland, 1842); Salar ausonii (Valenciennes, 1848); Fario argenteus (Valenciennes, 1848); Salar bailloni (Valenciennes, 1848); Salar gaimardi (Valenciennes, 1848); Salar spectabilis (Valenciennes, 1848); Salmo estuarius (Knox, 1855); Salar ausonii var. semipunctata (Heckel & Kner, 1858); Salar ausonii var. parcepunctata (Heckel & Kner, 1858); Salmo fario major (Walecki, 1863); Salmo venernensis (Günther, 1866); Salmo brachypoma (Günther, 1866); Salmo mistops (Günther, 1866); Salmo polyosteus (Günther, 1866); Salmo gallivensis (Günther, 1866); Salmo rappii (Günther, 1866); Salmo orcadensis (Günther, 1866); Salmo islayensis (Thomson, 1873); Salmo oxianus (Kessler, 1874); Salmo trutta oxianus (Kessler, 1874); Trutta variabilis (Lunel, 1874); Trutta marina (Moreau, 1881); Salmo lacustris rhenana (Fatio, 1890); Salmo lacustris septentrionalis (Fatio, 1890); Salmo lacustris romanovi (Kawraisky, 1896); Salmo trutta aralensis (Berg, 1908); Salmo trutta ezenami (non Berg, 1948); Salmo trutta ciscaucasicus (non Dorofeeva, 1967); Salmo abanticus Tortonese, 1954

= Brown trout =

Species of fish

The brown trout (Salmo trutta) is a species of carnivorous ray-finned fish and the most widely distributed species of the salmonid genus Salmo, endemic to most of Europe, West Asia and parts of North Africa, and has been widely introduced globally as a game fish, even becoming one of the world's worst invasive species outside of its native range.

Brown trout are highly adaptable and have evolved numerous ecotypes/subspecies. These include three main ecotypes: a riverine ecotype S. trutta morpha fario, commonly called river trout; a lacustrine ecotype S. trutta morpha lacustris, also called the lake trout (not to be confused with the lake trout in North America, which is a species of char); and an euryhaline ecotype S. trutta morpha trutta, also known as the sea trout. Sea trout in Ireland and Great Britain have many regional names: sewin in Wales, finnock in Scotland, peal in the West Country, mort in North West England, and white trout in Ireland.

Like all salmonids, all three brown trout ecotypes spawn in fresh water among the gravel beds of headstreams, where the water is colder and better aerated. Sea trout is anadromous, meaning it will spend the juvenile life stages in freshwater, but upon reaching adulthood will migrate downstream to the oceans for much of its life, and only returns to fresh water for reproduction. In contrast, the lacustrine and riverine morphs are both potamodromous, meaning they are also migratory but only between different freshwater bodies. Lacustrine trout mainly inhabit large lakes with calm and stratified deep water, while riverine trout forms fluvial populations typically in large rivers but sometimes in shallower creeks and alpine streams, both still migrating upstream during reproductive seasons. Anadromous and potamodromous morphs coexisting in the same river appear genetically identical. What determines whether they migrate to sea or not remains unknown.

== Description ==
Defining characteristics of brown trout include a slender body with a long, narrow head. The mouth is large, and on its roof, vomerine teeth are developed in a zig-zag pattern. The caudal fin is deltaform without forking, unlike that of the related Atlantic salmon (Salmo salar). Dark and red spots are often present on the sides, but do not extend to the tail. Parr trout (juvenile) often have a red margin on their adipose fin, with dark blotches along their sides that also become inconspicuous with age.

Freshwater brown trout range in colour from largely silver with relatively few spots and a white belly, to the more well-known brassy reddish-brown cast fading to creamy white on the fish's belly, with medium-sized spots surrounded by lighter halos. The more silver forms can be mistaken for rainbow trout. Regional variants include the so-called "Loch Leven" trout, distinguished by larger fins, a slimmer body, and heavy black spotting, but lacking red spots. The continental European strain features a lighter golden cast with some red spotting and fewer dark spots. Notably, both strains can show considerable individual variation from this general description. Early stocking efforts in the United States used fish taken from Scotland and Germany.

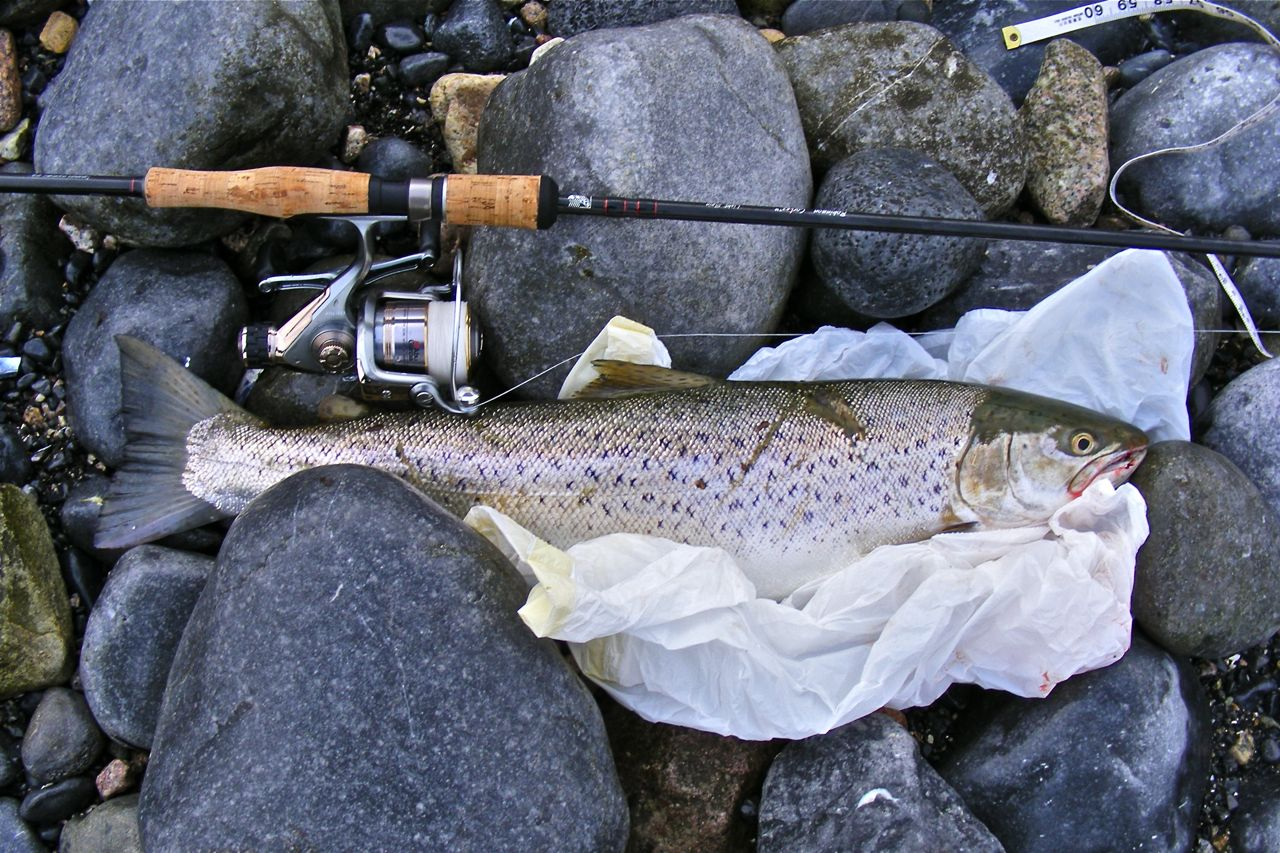
A 2.7-kg (6 lb), 60-cm (2 ft) sea trout, from Galway Bay in the west of Ireland bearing scars from a fishing net

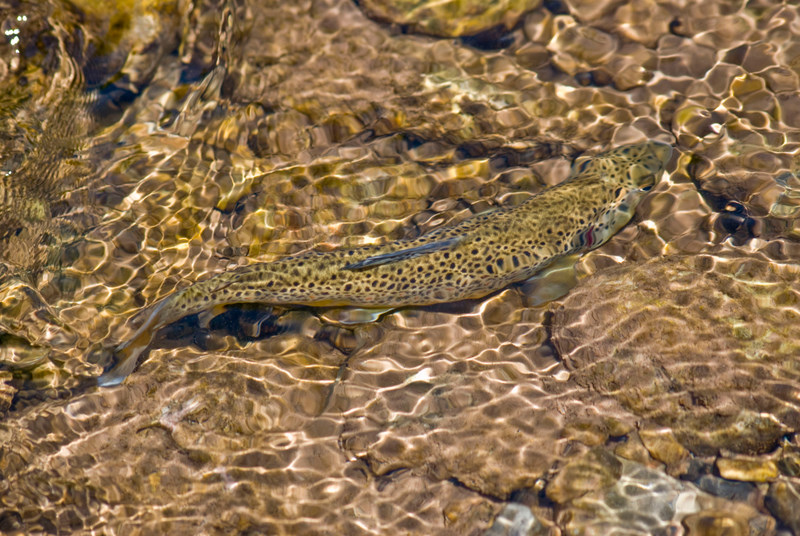
Brown trout in a creek

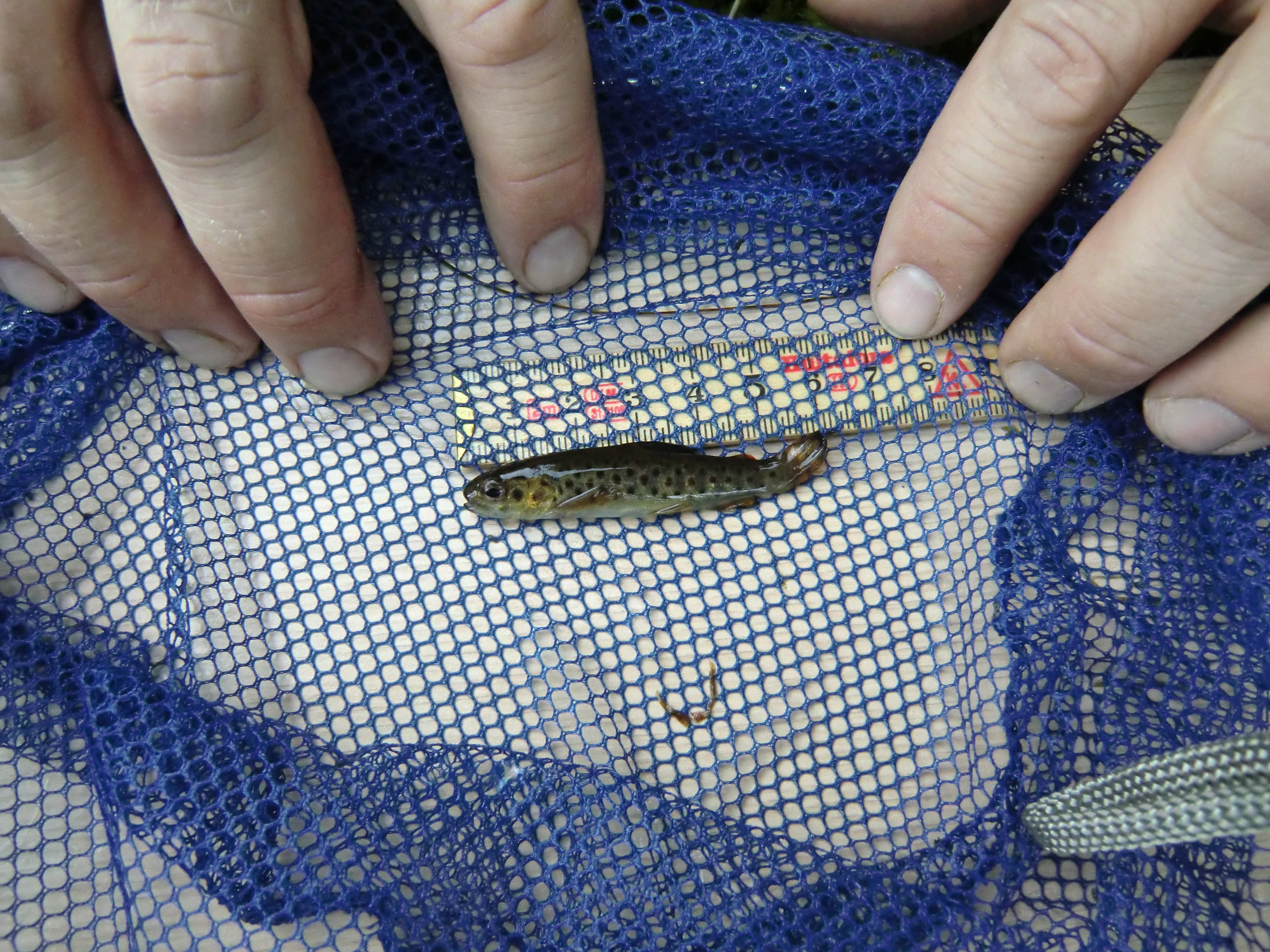
Brown trout in Värmland, Sweden, after the first summer

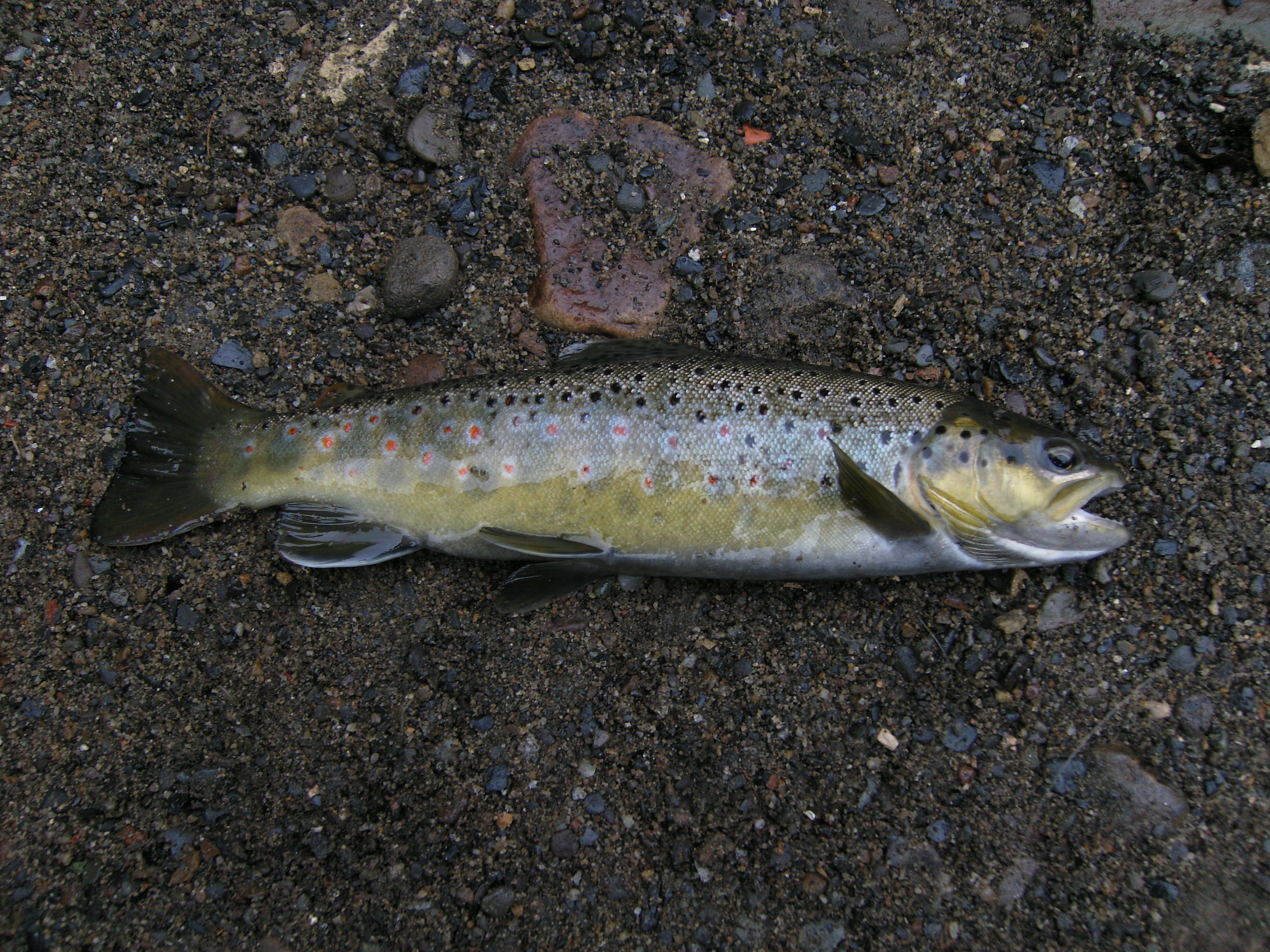
A young brown trout from the River Derwent in North East England

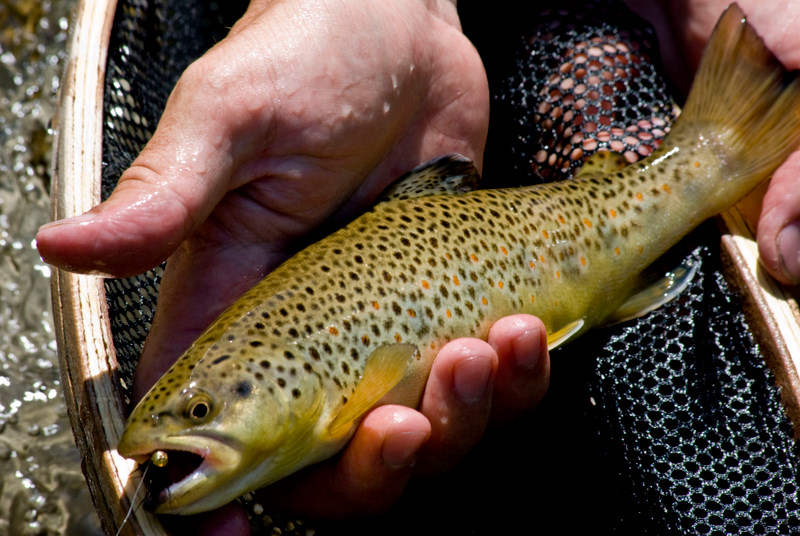
Brown trout from a western Wyoming creek

Brown trout is a medium-sized fish, growing to 20 kg (44 lb) or more and a length of about 100 cm (39 in) in some localities, although in many smaller rivers, a mature weight of 1.0 kg (2.2 lb) or less is common. S. t. lacustris reaches an average length of 40–80 cm (16–31 in) with a maximum length of 140 cm (55 in) and about 60 lb (27 kg).

On September 11, 2009, a 41.45-lb (18.80-kg) brown trout was caught by Tom Healy in the Manistee River system in Michigan, setting a new state record. As of late December 2009, the fish captured by Healy was confirmed by both the International Game Fish Association and the Fresh Water Fishing Hall of Fame as the new all-tackle world record for the species. This fish, which supplanted the former world record from the Little Red River in Arkansas, has in turn been exceeded by a 20.1-kilogram (44 lb) specimen caught in the Ohau Canal in Twizel, New Zealand on 27 October 2020. The all-tackle length IGFA world record is a 97-centimetre (38 in) fish caught in Milwaukee Harbor, Wisconsin on 16 December 2011.

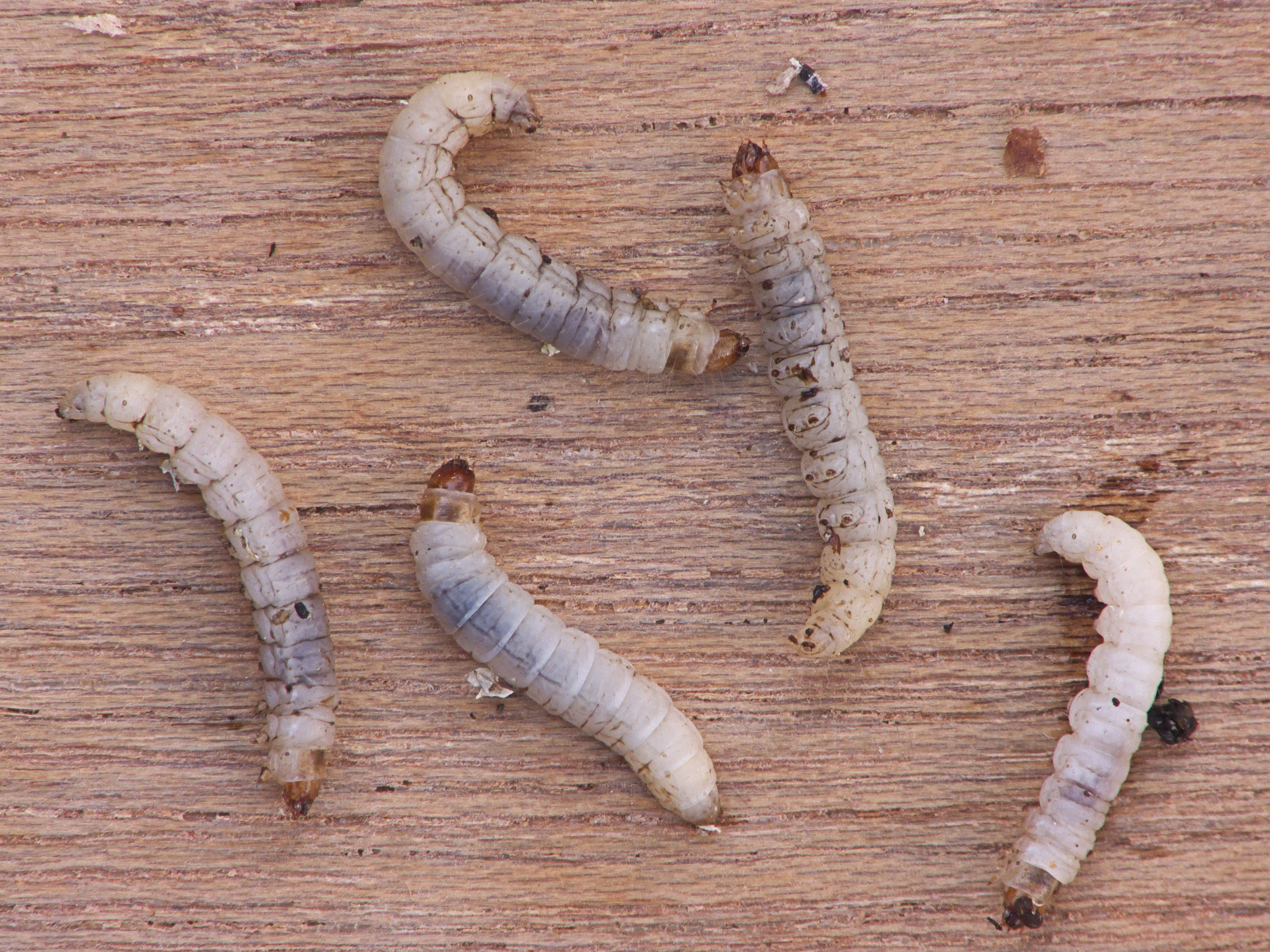
Waxworms

The spawning behaviour of brown trout is similar to that of the closely related Atlantic salmon. A typical female produces about 2,000 eggs per kg (900 eggs per lb) of body weight.

Brown trout can live 20 years, but as with the Atlantic salmon, a high proportion of males die after spawning, and probably fewer than 20% of anadromous female kelts recover from spawning. The migratory forms grow to significantly larger sizes for their age due to abundant invertebrate prey and forage fish in the waters where they spend most of their lives. Sea trout are more commonly female in less nutrient-rich rivers. Brown trout are active both by day and by night and are opportunistic feeders. While in freshwater, brown trouts are generalistic mesopredators and their diets frequently include invertebrates (insects, crustaceans, molluscs and benthic worms from the streambed), other fish, frogs (especially tadpoles) and sometimes even mice and small birds, and it is not uncommon for brown trout to breach the water surface to catch low-flying terrestrial insects. The high dietary reliance upon insect larvae, pupae, nymphs and adults allows trout to be a favoured target for fly fishing. Sea trout are fished for especially at night using wet flies, which imitate drowning insects. Brown trout can also be caught with lures such as spoons, spinners, jigs, plugs, plastic worm imitations, and live or dead baitfish.

Brown trout rarely form hybrids with other species; if they do, they are almost invariably infertile. One such example is the tiger trout, a hybrid with the brook trout.

== Taxonomy ==
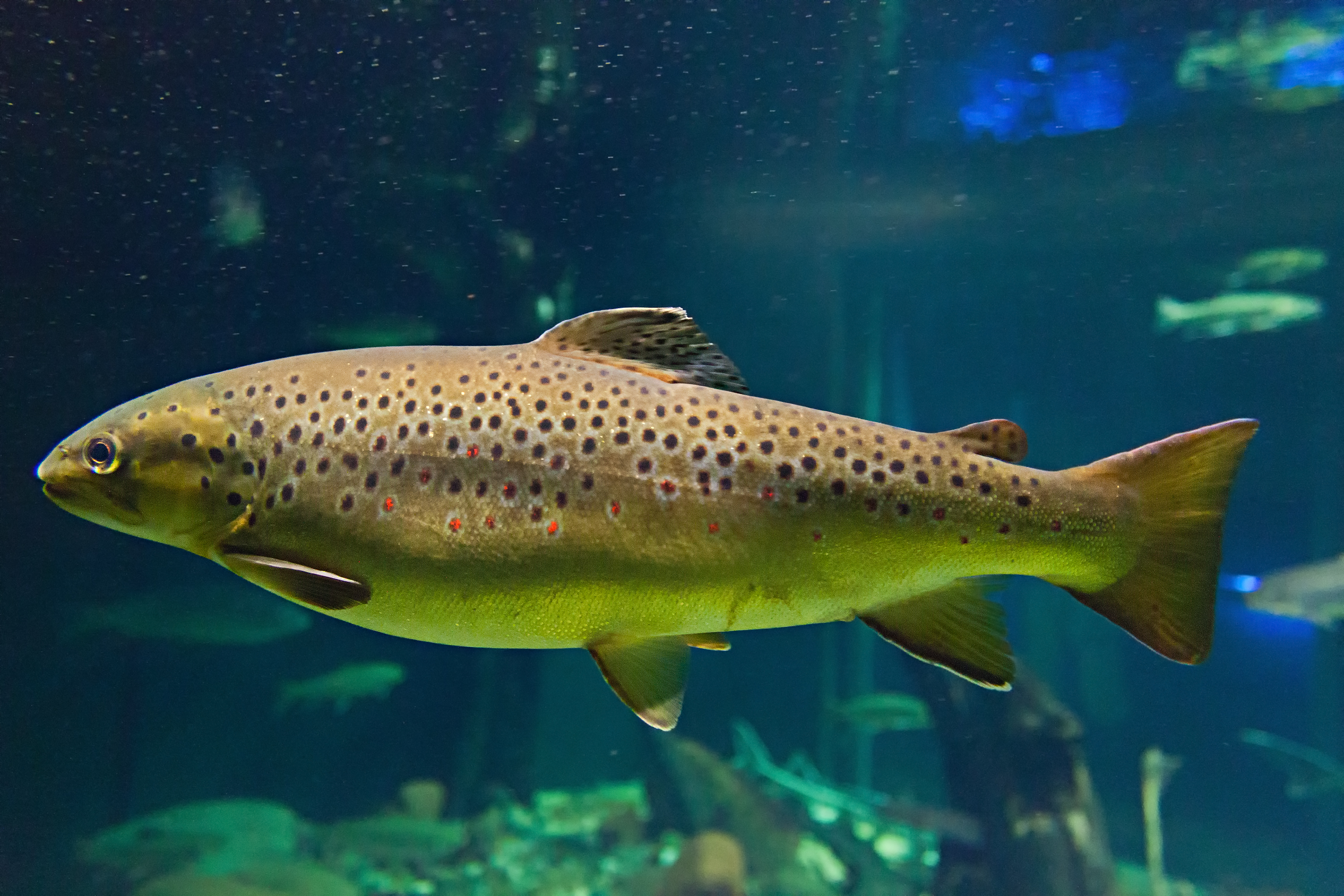
At Ozeaneum Stralsund

The scientific name of the brown trout is Salmo trutta. The specific epithet trutta derives from the Latin trutta, meaning, literally, "trout". Behnke (2007) relates that the brown trout was the first species of trout described in the 1758 edition of Systema Naturae by Swedish zoologist Carl Linnaeus. Systema Naturae established the system of binomial nomenclature for animals. Salmo trutta was used to describe anadromous or sea-run forms of brown trout. Linnaeus also described two other brown trout species in 1758. Salmo fario was used for riverine forms. Salmo lacustris was used for lake-dwelling forms.

== Range ==
A sea trout jumping a weir in Wales

The native range of brown trout extends from northern Norway and White Sea tributaries in Russia in the Arctic Ocean to the Atlas Mountains in North Africa. The western limit of their native range is Iceland in the north Atlantic, while the eastern limit is in Aral Sea tributaries in Afghanistan and Pakistan.

=== Introduction outside their natural range ===
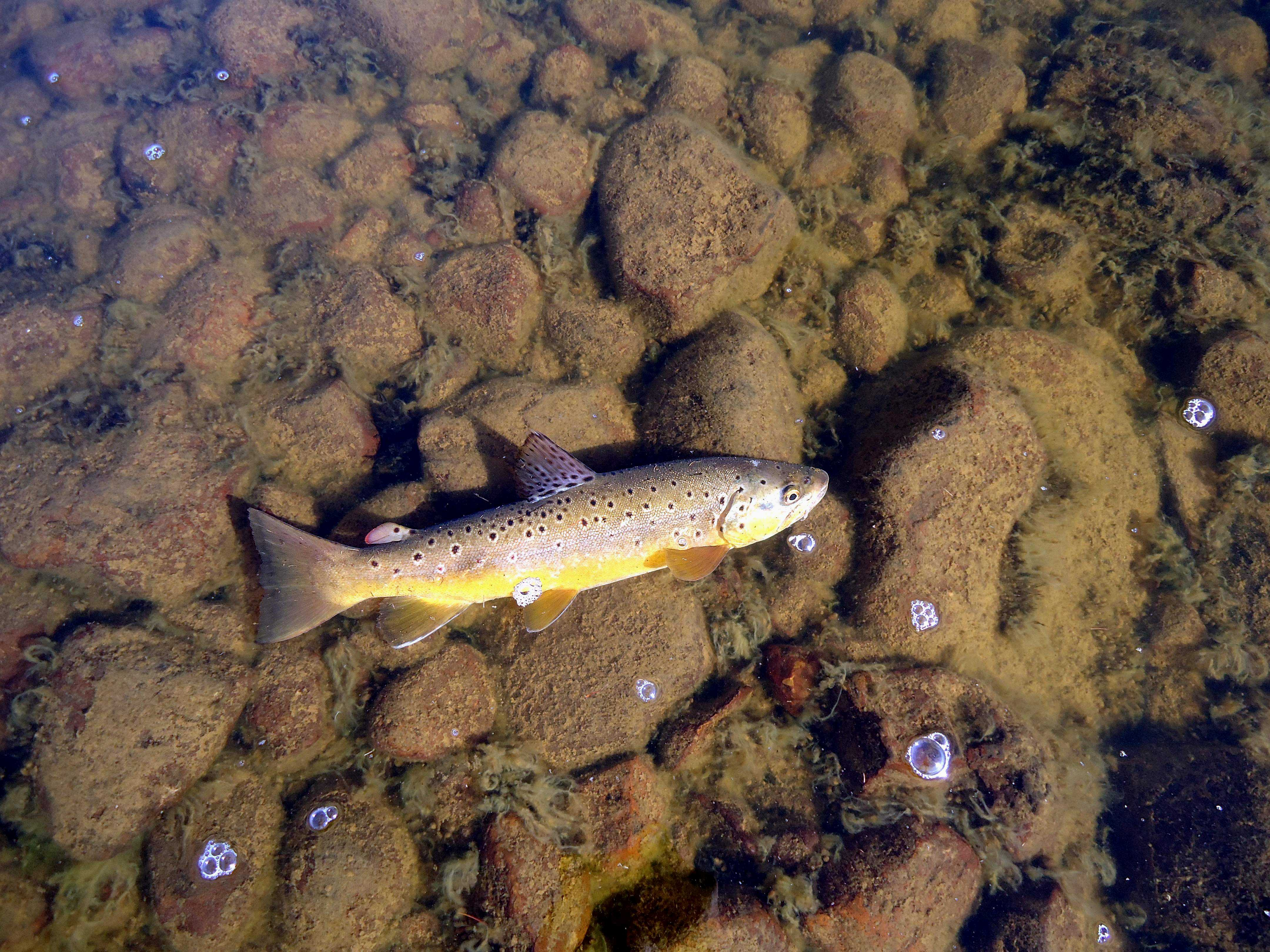
In the Kerguelen Islands. Brown trout were introduced here in 1954.

Brown trout have been widely introduced into suitable environments around the world, including North and South America, Australasia, Asia, and South and East Africa. Introduced brown trout have established self-sustaining, wild populations in many introduced countries. The first introductions were in Australia in 1864 when 300 of 1500 brown trout eggs from the River Itchen survived a four-month voyage from Falmouth, Cornwall to Melbourne on the sailing ship Norfolk. By 1866, 171 young brown trout were surviving in a Plenty River hatchery in Tasmania. Thirty-eight young trout were released in the river, a tributary of the River Derwent in 1866. By 1868, the Plenty River hosted a self-sustaining population of brown trout which became a brood source for continued introduction of brown trout into Australian and New Zealand rivers. Successful introductions into the Natal and Cape Provinces of South Africa took place in 1890 and 1892, respectively. By 1909, brown trout were established in the mountains of Kenya. The first introductions into the Himalayas in northern India took place in 1868, and by 1900, brown trout were established in Kashmir and Madras. In the 1950s and 1960s, Edgar Albert de la Rue, a French geologist, began the introduction of several species of salmonids on the remote Kerguelen Islands in the southern Indian Ocean. Of the seven species introduced, only brook trout, Salvelinus fontinalis, and brown trout survived to establish wild populations.

==== Introduction to the Americas ====
The first introductions in Canada occurred in 1883 in Newfoundland and continued until 1933. The only Canadian regions without brown trout are Yukon and the Northwest Territories. Introductions into South America began in 1904 in Argentina. Brown trout are now established in Chile, Peru and the Falklands. Sea-run forms of brown trout exceeding 20 lb (9.1 kg) are caught by local anglers on a regular basis.

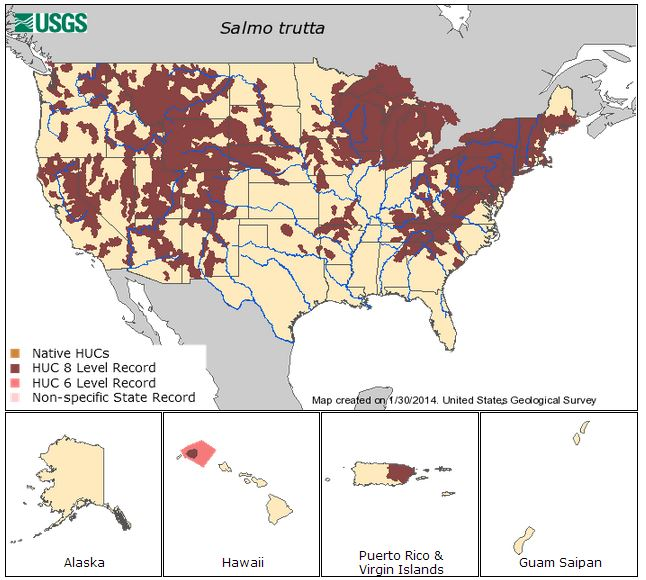
U.S. range of brown trout

The first introductions into the U.S. started in 1883 when Fred Mather, a New York pisciculturist and angler, under the authority of the U.S. Fish Commissioner, Spencer Baird, obtained brown trout eggs from a Baron Lucius von Behr, president of the German Fishing Society. The von Behr brown trout came from both mountain streams and large lakes in the Black Forest region of Baden-Württemberg. Three hatcheries handled the original shipment of "von Behr" brown trout eggs, one on Long Island, the Cold Spring Hatchery operated by Mather, one in Caledonia, New York operated by pisciculturalist Seth Green, and another hatchery in Northville, Michigan. Additional shipments of "von Behr" brown trout eggs arrived in 1884. In 1885, brown trout eggs from Loch Leven, Scotland, arrived in New York. These "Loch Leven" brown trout were distributed to the same hatcheries. Over the next few years, additional eggs from Scotland, England, and Germany were shipped to U.S. hatcheries. Behnke (2007) believed all life forms of brown trout—anadromous, riverine, and lacustrine—were imported into the U.S. and intermingled genetically to create what he calls the American generic brown trout and a single subspecies the North European brown trout (S. t. trutta).

In April 1884, the U.S. Fish Commission released 4900 brown trout fry into the Baldwin River, a tributary of the Pere Marquette River in Michigan. This was the first release of brown trout into U.S. waters. Between 1884 and 1890, brown trout were introduced into suitable habitats throughout the U.S. By 1900, 38 states and two territories had received stocks of brown trout. Their adaptability resulted in most of these introductions establishing wild, self-sustaining populations.

==== Introduction to Lake Taupō ====
Lake Taupō is noted for brown trout (Salmo trutta morpha lacustris), introduced from Scotland via Tasmania, in 1887, followed by rainbow trout from California in 1898.

== Conservation status ==
Infographic about the brown trout

The fish is not considered to be endangered, although some individual stocks are under various degrees of stress mainly through habitat degradation, overfishing, and artificial propagation leading to introgression. Increased frequency of excessively warm water temperatures in high summer causes a reduction in dissolved oxygen levels which can cause "summer kills" of local populations if temperatures remain high for sufficient duration and deeper/cooler or fast, turbulent more oxygenated water is not accessible to the fish. This phenomenon can be further exacerbated by eutrophication of rivers due to pollution—often from the use of agricultural fertilizers within the drainage basin.

Overfishing is a problem where anglers fail to identify and return mature female fish into the lake or stream. Each large female removed can result in thousands fewer eggs released back into the system when the remaining fish spawn.

In small streams, brown trout are important predators of macroinvertebrates, and declining brown trout populations in these specific areas affect the entire aquatic food web.

Global climate change is also of concern. S. trutta morpha fario prefers well-oxygenated water in the temperature range of 60 to 65 °F (16 to 18 °C). S. trutta bones from an archaeological site in Italy, and ancient DNA extracted from some of these bones, indicate that both abundance and genetic diversity increased markedly during the colder Younger Dryas period, and fell during the warmer Bølling-Allerød event.

Cover or structure is important to trout, and they are more likely to be found near submerged rocks and logs, undercut banks, and overhanging vegetation. Structure provides protection from predators, bright sunlight, and higher water temperatures. Access to deep water for protection in winter freezes, or fast water for protection from low oxygen levels in summer are also ideal. Trout are more often found in heavy and strong currents.

== Diet ==
Field studies have demonstrated that brown trout fed on several animal prey species, aquatic invertebrates (such as crustaceans and molluscs) being the most abundant prey items. However, brown trout also feed on other taxa such as terrestrial invertebrates (e.g. Hymenoptera) or other fish (e.g. small suckers, minnows, sculpin, and darters). Moreover, in brown trout, as in many other fish species, a change in the diet composition normally occurs during the life of the fish, and piscivorous behaviour is most frequent in large brown trout. These shifts in the diet during fish lifecycle transitions may be accompanied by a marked reduction in intraspecific competition in the fish population, facilitating the partitioning of resources. Brown trout that live in lakes and reservoirs normally eat zooplankton on the lake bed, detritus, and in some cases have a diet that only consists of algae. Piscivorous brown trout in rivers and streams will commonly eat trout eggs during the fall and early winter, as well as eating terrestrial insects. Anadromous brown trout diet is similar to freshwater brown trout with the inclusion of polychaetes. As anadromous trout migrate to the sea, diet change is gradual from freshwater to marine.

First feeding of newly emerged fry is very important for brown trout survival in this phase of the lifecycle, and first feeding can occur even prior to emergence. Fry start to feed before complete yolk absorption and the diet composition of newly emerged brown trout is composed of small prey such as chironomid larvae or baetid nymphs.

== Relationship with humans ==
=== Stocking and trout farming ===
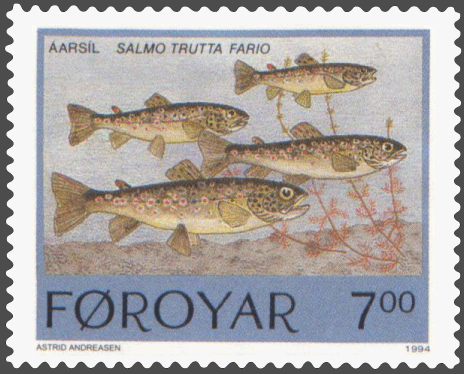
S. t. fario in a Faroese stamp issued in 1994

Brown trout has been widely introduced into North America, South America, Australia, New Zealand for sport fishing, and many other countries, including Bhutan, where they are the focus of a specialised fly fishery. The first stocking in the United States occurred on April 11, 1884, into the Baldwin River, one mile east of Baldwin, Michigan. Brown trout have had serious negative impacts on upland native fish species in some of the countries where they have been introduced, and in Chile, Australia, New Zealand and other locations in the Southern Hemisphere, brown trout compete with and prey upon freshwater fish from the family Galaxiidae, who also have affinity for cold, shallow, well-oxygenated streams and thus often share habitats. Brown trout additionally are voracious predators of tadpoles and freshwater invertebrates and can carry microbial pathogens like Aeromonas salmonicida. Genetic background is a very important factor when determining the success of trout populations, this information is vital to restore and enhance previous populations. Because of the trout's importance as a food and game fish, it has been artificially propagated and stocked in many places in its range, and fully natural populations (uncontaminated by allopatric genomes) probably exist only in isolated places, for example in Corsica or in high alpine valleys on the European mainland.

Farming of brown trout has included the production of infertile triploid trout by increasing the water temperature just after fertilisation of eggs, or more reliably, by a process known as pressure shocking. Triploids are favoured by anglers because they grow faster and larger than natural diploid trout. Proponents of stocking triploids argue, because they are infertile, they can be introduced into an environment that contains wild brown trout without the negative effects of cross-breeding. However, stocking triploids may damage wild stocks in other ways. Triploids certainly compete with diploid fish for food, space, and other resources. They could also be more aggressive than diploid fish and they may disturb spawning behaviour.

=== Angling ===
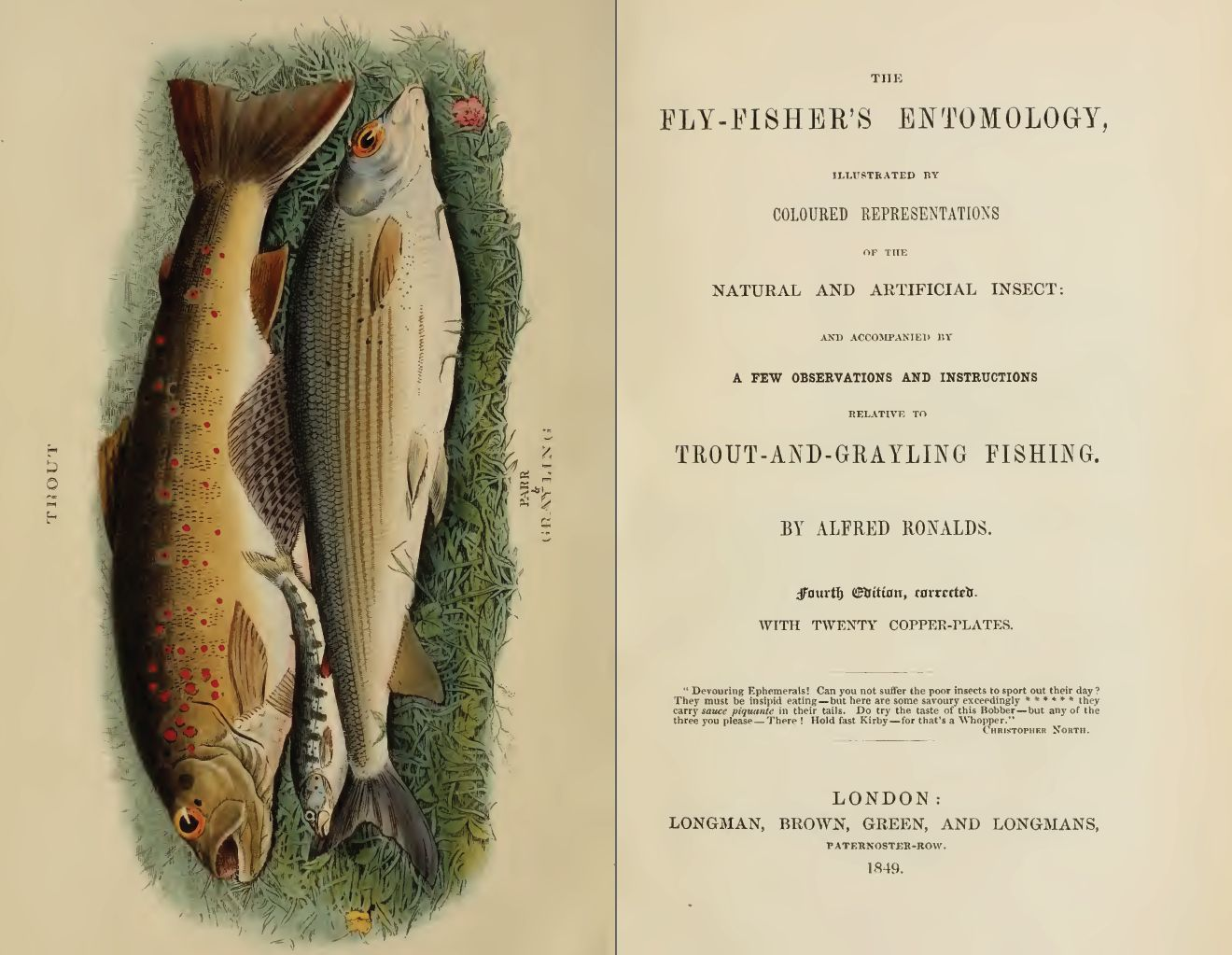
Frontis and title page from The Fly-fisher's Entomology, 1849, by Alfred Ronalds, showing a brown trout and a grayling

The brown trout has been a popular game fish of European anglers for centuries. It was first mentioned in angling literature as "fish with speckled skins" by Roman author Aelian (circa 200 AD) in On the Nature of Animals. This work is credited with describing the first instance of fly fishing for trout, specifically the brown trout found in Macedonia. The Treatyse of Fysshynge with an Angle (1496) by Dame Juliana Berners, O.S.B is considered a foundational work in the history of recreational fishing, especially fly fishing. One of the most prominent fish described in the work is the brown trout of English rivers and streams:

The trout, because he is a right dainty fish and also a right fervent biter, we shall speak of next. He is in season from March until Michaelmas. He is on clean gravel bottom and in a stream.

— Treatyse of Fysshynge with an Angle (1496)

The renowned The Compleat Angler (1653) by Izaak Walton is replete with advice on "the trout":

The Trout is a fish highly valued, both in this and foreign nations. He may be justly said, as the old poet said of wine, and we English say of venison, to be a generous fish: a fish that is so like the buck, that he also has his seasons; for it is observed, that he comes in and goes out of season with the stag and buck. Gesner says, his name is of a German offspring; and says he is a fish that feeds clean and purely, in the swiftest streams, and on the hardest gravel; and that he may justly contend with all fresh water fish, as the Mullet may with all sea fish, for precedency and daintiness of taste; and that being in right season, the most dainty palates have allowed precedency to him.

— The Compleat Angler, (1653)

Throughout the 17th, 18th and 19th centuries, angling authors, mostly British, some French, and later American, writing about trout fishing were writing about fishing for brown trout. Once brown trout were introduced into the U.S. in the 1880s, they became a major subject of American angling literature. In 1889, Frederic M. Halford, a British angler, author published Dry-Fly Fishing in Theory and Practice, a seminal work codifying a half century of evolution of fly fishing with floating flies for brown trout. In the late 19th century, American angler and writer Theodore Gordon, often called the "Father of American Dry Fly Fishing", perfected dry-fly techniques for the newly arrived, but difficult-to-catch brown trout in Catskill rivers such as the Beaverkill and Neversink Rivers. In the early 20th century, British angler and author G. E. M. Skues pioneered nymphing techniques for brown trout on English chalk streams. His Minor Tactics of the Chalk Stream (1910) began a revolution in fly fishing techniques for trout. In 1917, Scottish author Hamish Stuart published the first comprehensive text, The Book of The Sea Trout, specifically addressing angling techniques for the anadromous forms of brown trout.

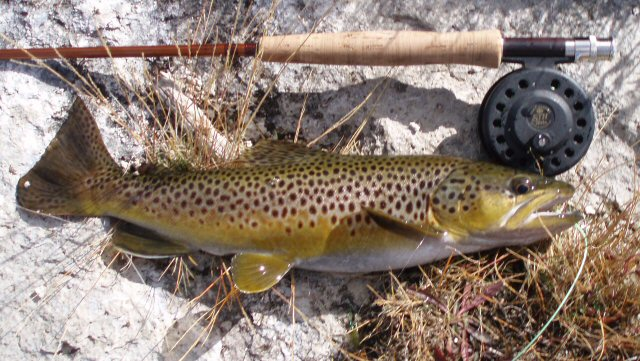
Firehole river brown trout

Introductions of brown trout into the American West created new angling opportunities, none so successful from an angling perspective as was the introduction of browns into the upper Firehole River in Yellowstone National Park in 1890. One of the earliest accounts of trout fishing in the park is from Mary Trowbridge Townsend's 1897 article in Outing Magazine "A Woman's Trout Fishing in Yellowstone Park" in which she talks about catching the von Behr trout in the river:

Long dashes down stream taxed my unsteady footing; the sharp click and whirr of the reel resounded in desperate efforts to hold him somewhat in check; another headlong dash, then a vicious bulldog shake of the head as he sawed back and forth across the rocks. Every wile inherited from generations of wily ancestors was tried until, in a moment of exhaustion, the net was slipped under him. Wading ashore with my prize, I had barely time to notice his size—a good four-pounder, and unusual markings, large yellow spots encircled by black, with great brilliancy of iridescent color—when back he flopped into the water and was gone. However, I took afterward several of the same variety, known in the Park as the Von Baer [sic] trout, and which I have since found to be the Salmo fario, the veritable trout of Izaak Walton.

— Outing Magazine, (1897)

Within the US, brown trout introductions have created self-sustaining fisheries throughout the country. Many are considered "world-class" such as in the Great Lakes and in several Arkansas tailwaters. Outside the U.S. and outside its native range in Europe, introduced brown trout have created "world-class" fisheries in New Zealand, Patagonia, and the Falklands.
