= North Lake Correctional Facility =

Prison in Baldwin, Michigan

Coordinates: 43°55′46″N 85°50′28″W

- Interactive map of North Lake Correctional Facility
- Location: 1805 W 32nd Street Baldwin, Michigan
- Security class: Medium; maximum
- Capacity: 1,741
- Opened: 1999; expanded 2009
- Managed by: GEO Group

North Lake Correctional Facility is a privately owned medium- and maximum-security prison for men located in Baldwin, Michigan, United States, owned & operated by GEO Group.

Originally opened in 1999, it was closed in 2022 when the federal government cancelled contracts with for-profit prisons. It was re-opened in 2025 as the North Lake Processing Center. It is the largest immigrant detention center in the Midwest region.

== History ==
The prison was originally built in 1999 by Wackenhut to house Michigan’s youth offenders under contract for the Michigan Department of Corrections. The GEO Group, Wackenhut's successor firm, expanded the prison from 570 to 1,748 beds in late 2009. Some 280 high security inmates convicted of crimes in the state of Vermont arrived from other out-of-state prisons (in Arizona and Kentucky) to the Baldwin facility in June 2015. County Commissioner Dan Sloan stated that as many as 150 jobs would result from the influx of out-of-state prisoners to the facility.

Vermont received notice that GEO was terminating its contract effective June 2017; Vermont Corrections relocated the prisoners from the Baldwin facility. GEO secured a 10-year contract with the Federal Bureau of Prisons in 2019 to house non-citizen immigrant convicts, but the prison closed again in September 2022 when the federal government cancelled all contracts with privately owned for-profit prisons.

The prison was reopened as the North Lake Processing Center on June 16, 2025 as a U.S. Immigration and Customs Enforcement (ICE) processing center, making it one of the largest such facilities in the country. Between August 2025 and February 2026, over 800 habeas petitions were filed on behalf of people detained at the facility, with judges ruling in over 90% of the petitions that they were unlawfully detained.

On April 20, 2026, detainees at the processing center began a hunger strike. As of April 21, approximately 200 detainees are participating in the strike. The strike is in protest of poor living condition and medical care, as well as procedural delays. The Department of Homeland Security has officially denied the hunger strike. In May 2026, according to the Manchester Mirror, the ACLU of Michigan and the Michigan Immigrant Rights Center claimed detainees at the facility were being "denying adequate medical care" and that the facility was "limiting their access to attorneys, immigrant advocacy and civil rights organizations".
