= Shrine of the Pines =

Museum in Baldwin, Michigan

Coordinates: 43°51′37.0″N 85°50′53.6″W

Shrine of the Pines is a property south of Baldwin, Michigan on highway M-37. It is significant for its collection of early 20th-century American craft furniture. Created by Raymond W. Overholzer over the course of nearly 30 years from the early 1920s until his death in 1952, the collection was intended as a memorial to the eastern white pine which had been logged to near extinction in northern Michigan. The property, which includes the original log cabin built as a gallery space to house the furniture collection, along with the furniture was designated a Michigan State Historic Site on July 20, 1982.

Overholzer, a native of Ohio, moved to the community of Marlborough, Michigan with his wife in 1920 during the era of extensive logging. An avid hunter and taxidermist, Overholzer regularly wandered what is now Manistee National Forest hunting game that he would later mount. Deeply concerned that the white pine had been ravaged throughout the area, he began collecting stumps and roots that remained from the logging activity, initially crafting them into mirror frames and bases for his taxidermy.

By 1939 Overholzer's collection of handcrafted items, made mostly of found white pine pieces, had grown so large that he and three lumberman constructed a cabin as a gallery space. The cabin was given the name "Shrine of the Pines," memorializing what had been Michigan's greatest natural resource. The cabin was opened to the public, and Overholzer continued to work tirelessly, adding to the collection which numbered 201 pieces at the time of his death. The collection includes a dining table and seating for ten, a buffet and a side tables, beds for guests, a game table with five club chairs, rocking chair with an accompanying ottoman, a pair of fireplace chairs, a revolving gun rack, etc. The dining table was made of one 700-pound root, with over 60 inlays in its surface.

Each piece was constructed using only hand tools, with wooden dowel joinery, and glue made of Overholzer's own formula rumored to have included pine pitch, fish innards, deer hair, different parts of deer, and sawdust.

Overholzer sanded the surfaces with homemade sandpaper made from the used sanding belts from the local lumber companies as well as of crushed glass and local sands, and finished the pieces with animal grease.

Overholzer was survived by his wife, Hortense Overholtzer, who outlived him by 7 years. After she died, she willed the collection of furniture along with the property to the Boysville of Clinton, Michigan. Now known as Holycross of Clinton, Mi; Formally Boysville of Baldwin.

Later acquired by a group of local patrons, the shrine remains open, with tours available May 1 through November 1.
