= Pleasant Plains Township, Michigan =

- Civil township
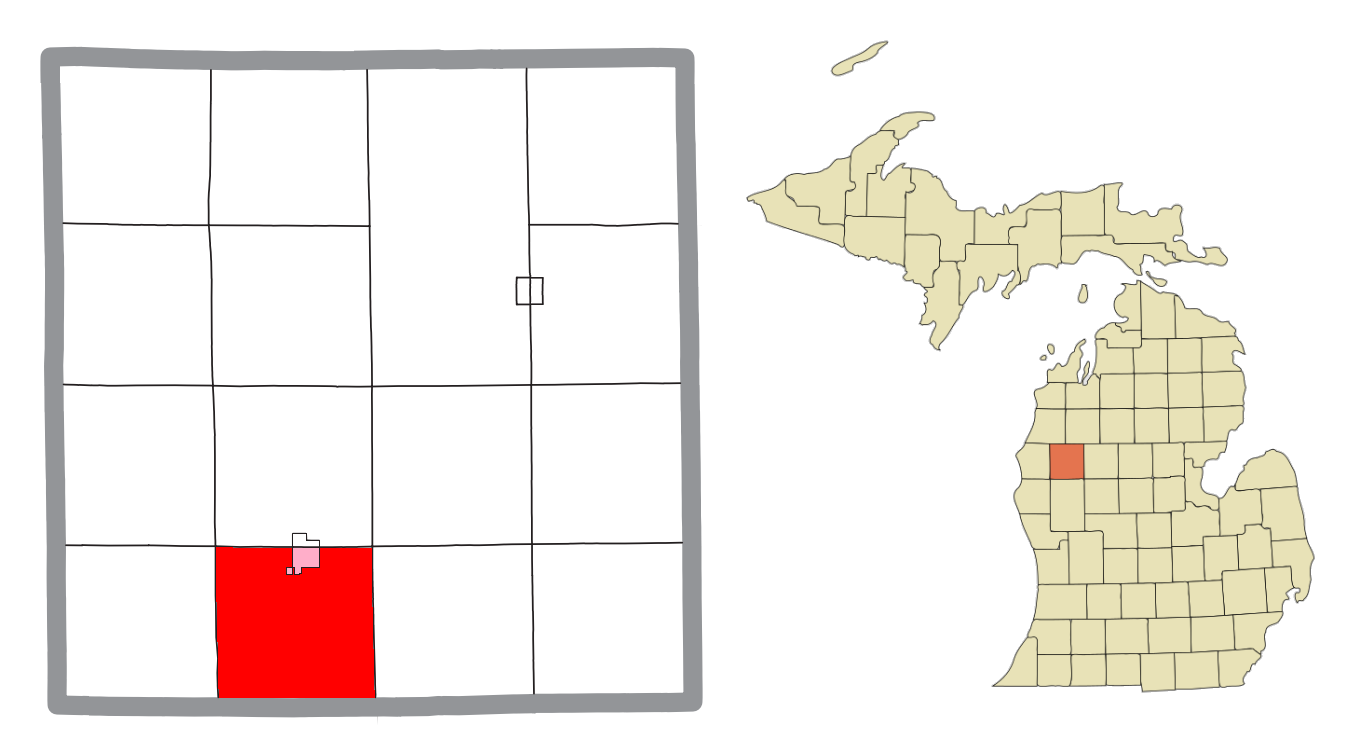
- Location within Lake County (red) and an administered portion of the Baldwin village (pink)

- Location within the state of Michigan Location within the United States
- Coordinates: 43°52′03″N 85°50′23″W
- Country: United States
- State: Michigan
- County: Lake

Area
  - Total: 35.3 sq mi (91.4 km^{2})
  - Land: 34.7 sq mi (89.9 km^{2})
  - Water: 0.58 sq mi (1.5 km^{2})
- Elevation: 807 ft (246 m)

Population (2020)
  - Total: 1,603
  - Density: 46.2/sq mi (17.8/km^{2})
- Time zone: UTC-5 (Eastern (EST))
  - Summer (DST): UTC-4 (EDT)
- FIPS code: 26-64880
- GNIS feature ID: 1626916
- Website: https://pleasantplainstwp.org/

Pleasant Plains Township is a civil township of Lake County in the U.S. state of Michigan. The population was 1,603 at the 2020 census.

== Geography ==
According to the United States Census Bureau, the township has a total area of 35.3 square miles (91 km^{2}), of which 34.7 square miles (90 km^{2}) is land and 0.6 square miles (1.6 km^{2}) (1.62%) is water.

== Communities ==
- Baldwin is a village located in the northern portion of the township. Baldwin is the county seat of Lake County.
- Forman was an unincorporated community centered on a lumber mill. It established in 1873.

== Demographics ==
As of the census of 2000, there were 1,535 people, 657 households, and 394 families residing in the township. The population density was 44.2 inhabitants per square mile (17.1/km^{2}). There were 1,547 housing units at an average density of 44.6 per square mile (17.2/km^{2}). The racial makeup of the township was 75.37% White, 20.20% African American, 0.65% Native American, 0.39% Asian, 0.52% from other races, and 2.87% from two or more races. Hispanic or Latino of any race were 1.43% of the population.

There were 657 households, out of which 24.7% had children under the age of 18 living with them, 41.6% were married couples living together, 14.0% had a female householder with no husband present, and 40.0% were non-families. 34.1% of all households were made up of individuals, and 17.5% had someone living alone who was 65 years of age or older. The average household size was 2.30 and the average family size was 2.92.

In the township the population was spread out, with 25.0% under the age of 18, 7.2% from 18 to 24, 22.3% from 25 to 44, 26.4% from 45 to 64, and 19.2% who were 65 years of age or older. The median age was 42 years. For every 100 females, there were 99.9 males. For every 100 females age 18 and over, there were 94.6 males.

The median income for a household in the township was $22,353, and the median income for a family was $29,632. Males had a median income of $29,583 versus $22,105 for females. The per capita income for the township was $15,571. About 19.6% of families and 25.6% of the population were below the poverty line, including 36.4% of those under age 18 and 16.7% of those age 65 or over.
