= Baldwin, Michigan =

- Village
- Village of Baldwin
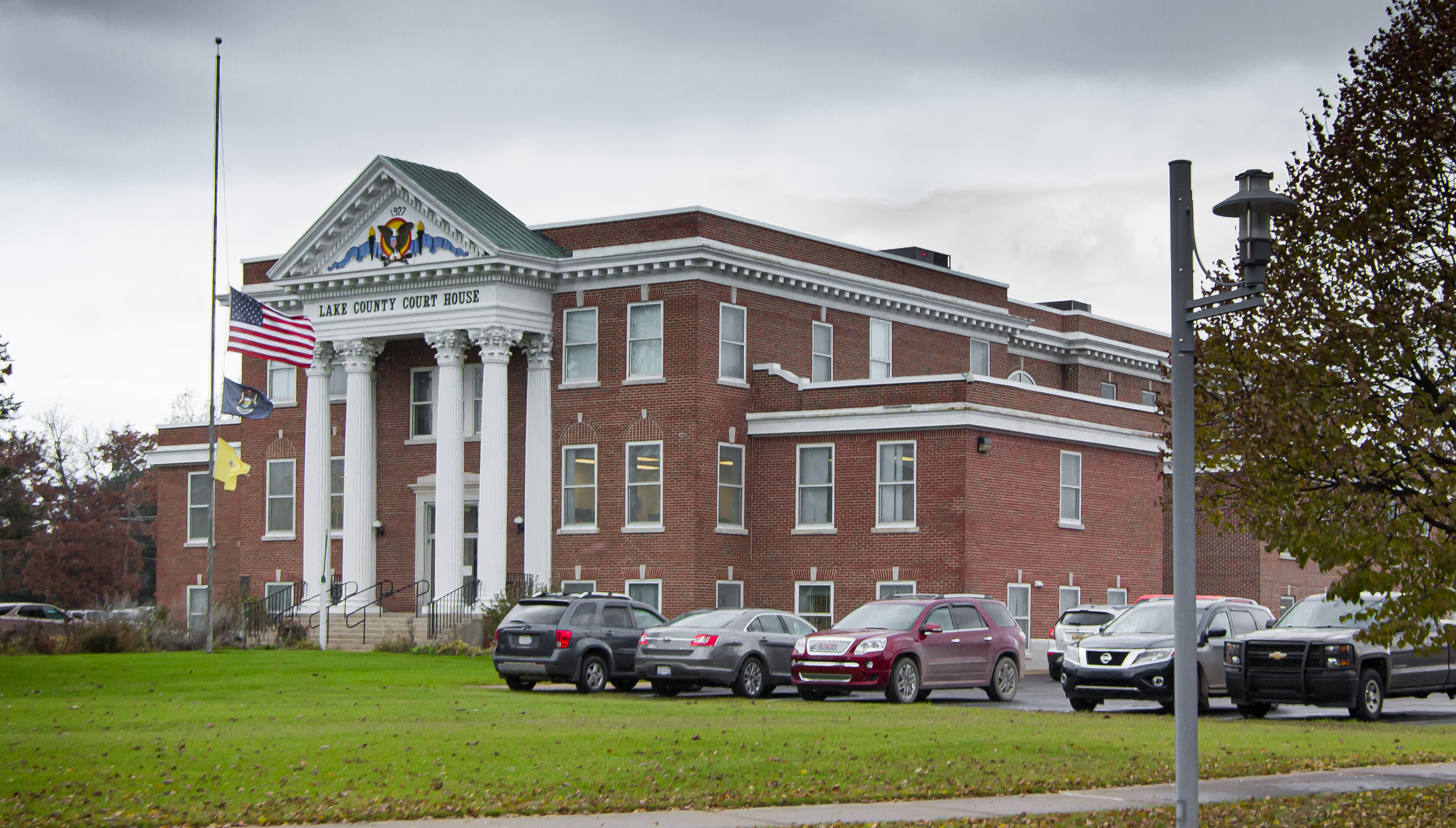
- Lake County Courthouse

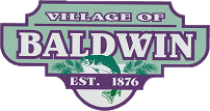
- Seal

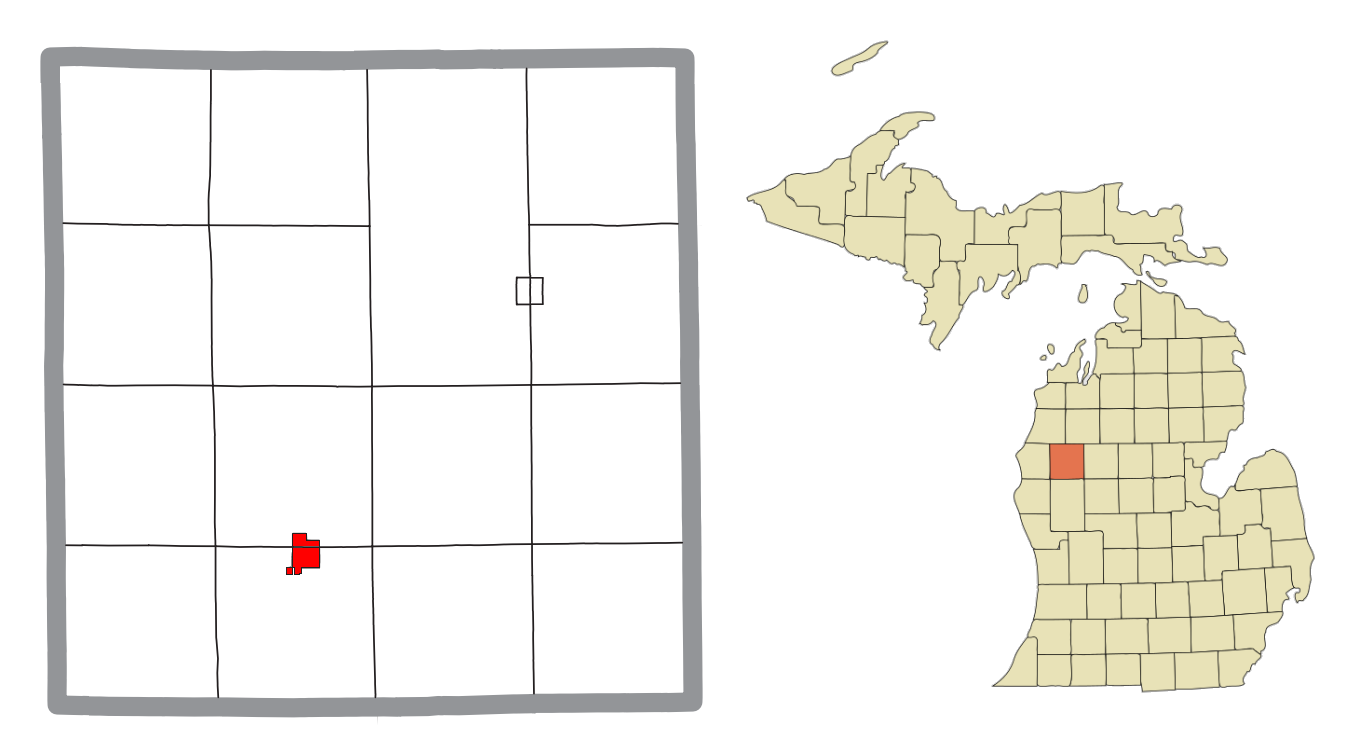
- Location within Lake County

- Location within the state of Michigan Location within the United States
- Coordinates: 43°53′50″N 85°51′11″W
- Country: United States
- State: Michigan
- County: Lake
- Townships: Pleasant Plains and Webber
- Settled: 1870
- Incorporated: 1887

Government
  - Type: Village council
  - President: Harold Nichols
  - Clerk: Theresa Lamb
  - Treasurer: Cassie Smith

Area
  - Total: 1.27 sq mi (3.29 km^{2})
  - Land: 1.26 sq mi (3.26 km^{2})
  - Water: 0.012 sq mi (0.03 km^{2})
- Elevation: 856 ft (261 m)

Population (2020)
  - Total: 902
  - Density: 715.87/sq mi (276.40/km^{2})
- Time zone: UTC-5 (Eastern (EST))
  - Summer (DST): UTC-4 (EDT)
- ZIP code(s): 49304
- Area code: 231
- FIPS code: 26-04940
- GNIS feature ID: 2398022
- Website: Official website

Baldwin is a village in and county seat of Lake County in the U.S. state of Michigan. The population was 863 at the 2020 census. The village is mostly located in Pleasant Plains Township with a smaller portion extending north into Webber Township

== Geography ==
According to the United States Census Bureau, the village has a total area of 1.26 square miles (3.26 km^{2}), all land.

== Demographics ==
Historical population
Census	Pop.	Note	%±
1880	165		—
1890	429		160.0%
1900	343		−20.0%
1910	502		46.4%
1920	471		−6.2%
1930	518		10.0%
1940	612		18.1%
1950	835		36.4%
1960	835		0.0%
1970	612		−26.7%
1980	674		10.1%
1990	821		21.8%
2000	1,107		34.8%
2010	1,208		9.1%
2020	902		−25.3%
U.S. Decennial Census

=== 2010 census ===
As of the census of 2010, there were 1,208 people, 404 households, and 190 families residing in the village. The population density was 958.7 inhabitants per square mile (370.2/km^{2}). There were 478 housing units at an average density of 379.4 per square mile (146.5/km^{2}). The racial makeup of the village was 62.8% White, 29.0% African American, 0.9% Native American, 0.1% Asian, 0.7% from other races, and 6.5% from two or more races. Hispanic or Latino of any race were 4.1% of the population.

There were 404 households, of which 29.7% had children under the age of 18 living with them, 24.0% were married couples living together, 19.8% had a female householder with no husband present, 3.2% had a male householder with no wife present, and 53.0% were non-families. 49.0% of all households were made up of individuals, and 20% had someone living alone who was 65 years of age or older. The average household size was 2.07 and the average family size was 3.06.

The median age in the village was 36.8 years. 20.3% of residents were under the age of 18; 9.9% were between the ages of 18 and 24; 31.5% were from 25 to 44; 23% were from 45 to 64; and 15.2% were 65 years of age or older. The gender makeup of the village was 53.3% male and 46.7% female.

=== 2000 census ===
As of the census of 2000, there were 1,107 people, 397 households, and 183 families residing in the village. The population density was 873.2 inhabitants per square mile (337.1/km^{2}). There were 479 housing units at an average density of 377.8 per square mile (145.9/km^{2}). The racial makeup of the village was 59.62% White, 34.33% African American, 1.36% Native American, 0.45% from other races, and 4.25% from two or more races. Hispanic or Latino of any race were 2.71% of the population.

There were 397 households, out of which 26.7% had children under the age of 18 living with them, 27.0% were married couples living together, 17.1% had a female householder with no husband present, and 53.9% were non-families. 49.6% of all households were made up of individuals, and 27.2% had someone living alone who was 65 years of age or older. The average household size was 2.12 and the average family size was 3.19.

In the village, the population was spread out, with 22.2% under the age of 18, 12.8% from 18 to 24, 26.7% from 25 to 44, 16.4% from 45 to 64, and 21.8% who were 65 years of age or older. The median age was 35 years. For every 100 females, there were 113.3 males. For every 100 females age 18 and over, there were 112.1 males.

The median income for a household in the village was $15,550, and the median income for a family was $22,857. Males had a median income of $26,042 versus $21,364 for females. The per capita income for the village was $9,619. About 32.0% of families and 35.9% of the population were below the poverty line, including 44.7% of those under age 18 and 21.1% of those age 65 or over.

== Major highways ==
- US 10
- M-37

== Services ==
Baldwin is served by the Baldwin Community Schools school district, including Baldwin High School. A "Baldwin Promise" promises funding for college education in Michigan of all Baldwin High School graduates.

== Attractions ==
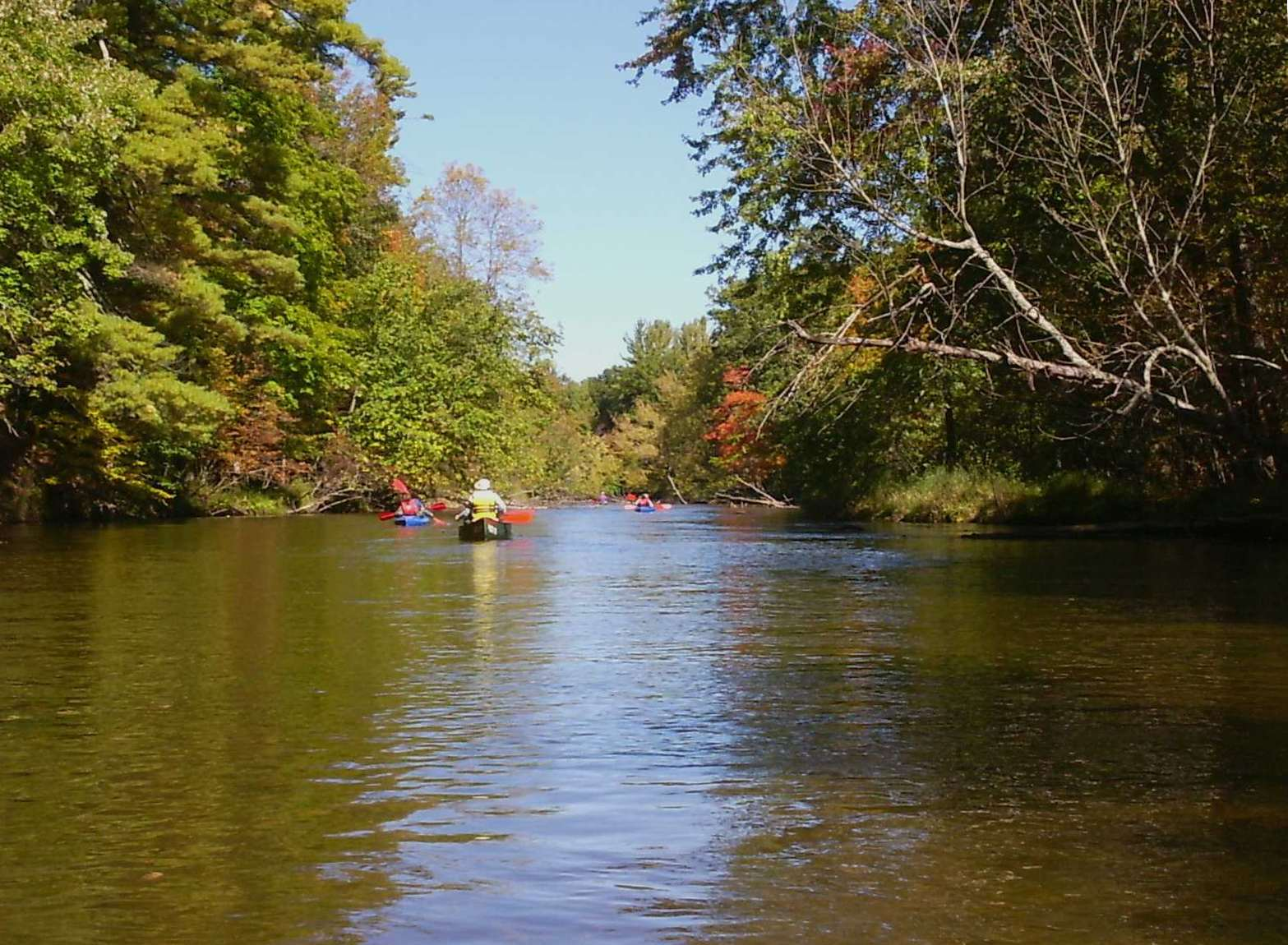
Tourists canoeing on the Pere Marquette River in the Manistee National Forest.

Baldwin is primarily a tourist town. As such, much of its economy is based around the summer months. Lake County sports many lakes and rivers, as well as the vast wilderness of the Manistee National Forest. Many come to Baldwin on vacation to camp, canoe, fish, or hunt.

The Shrine of the Pines is a noted tourist attraction.

The nearby Pere Marquette River is one of America's Blue Ribbon fisheries and sportfishing is a major contributor to the local economy.

The nearby Baldwin River, a tributary of the Pere Marquette River, is the site of the first planting of German Brown Trout in the United States on April 11, 1884.

Baldwin is home of the world's largest trout statue. Located downtown Baldwin, the trout stands 25 feet tall. The village and Lake County take pride in this structure.

== Private prison ==
The North Lake Correctional Facility is a private, for-profit, maximum security prison that was constructed in the late 1990s in Baldwin by the Wackenhut Corrections Co. (now the GEO Group). The prison was originally built to house Michigan's youth offenders, but the state withdrew its charges from the facility. The GEO group expanded the prison from 500 to 1,700 beds; by 2005 it was vacant. For a brief time it housed some inmates from California in 2011 but was soon closed again.

In June 2015, GEO Group contracted for two years with the state of Vermont to house 280 high-security inmates convicted of crimes in the state of Vermont in the North Lake Correctional Facility. It was far from home; many had previously been housed in private prison facilities in Kentucky and Arizona.

This contract was facilitated by the state legislature enacting a bill to support the private prison, specifically to authorize incarceration of high-security inmates at this facility. Lake Country Republican Rep. Jon Bumstead had sponsored a bill in the Michigan Legislature to raise the security rating of the North Lake facility to Michigan's highest in order to accomplish this. The Michigan Senate voted 23–14 to remove the former restrictive provision, making it legal for the GEO Group to house out-of-state prisoners of all security classifications in Baldwin.

As Lake County has high poverty and unemployment rates, legislators thought the expanded prison could provide some jobs to local residents. County Commissioner Dan Sloan stated that as many as 150 jobs would result from the transfer of out-of-state prisoners to the facility. In December 2016 GEO Group told Vermont that it would not renew its contract with the state in June 2017; some 256 long-term prisoners from Vermont are being held at this prison.

In May 2019, GEO announced that it obtained a contract with the Federal Bureau of Prisons to house illegal immigrants that were convicted of crimes while illegally in the US. On October 1, 2019, the prison officially started to accept these prisoners. It was again closed in September 2022.

In June 2025, the facility reopened as an immigration detention center for United States Immigration and Customs Enforcement (ICE). It is the largest immigration detention center in the Midwest region.

== Notable people ==
- Robert F. Williams, African-American activist, lived in Baldwin
