= Peter Pernin =

French missionary priest (1822–1909)

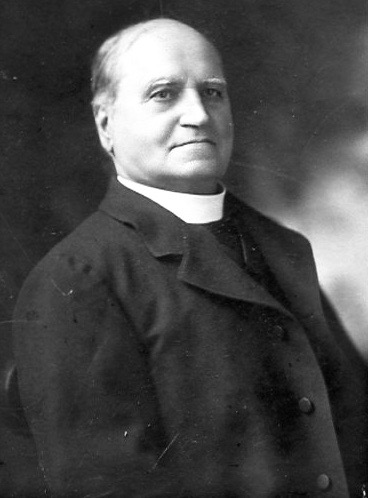
- Photograph of Pernin 1890
- Born: February 22, 1822; Flacey-en-Bresse, Bourgogne-Franche-Comté, France
- Died: October 9, 1909 (aged 87); Rochester, Minnesota, United States
- Years active: 1864–1898
- Writings: The Finger of God Is There! (1874)

Jean-Pierre Pernin (February 22, 1822 – October 9, 1909), also known as Peter Pernin in America, was a French Roman Catholic priest, who came to the United States in 1864 as a missionary, working in Illinois, Wisconsin, and Minnesota. As Catholic pastor of Peshtigo, Wisconsin, he survived the Peshtigo fire on October 8–9, 1871. His survivor's memoir, written originally in French, published simultaneously in English translation, and entitled Le doigt de Dieu est là! / The Finger of God Is There!, is a document important to the history of the fire.

== Early life and career in France ==
Jean-Pierre Pernin was born February 22, 1822, in Flacey-en-Bresse, an agricultural village in Saône-et-Loire. He studied humanities and developed his writing skills at Collège de Meximieux (Ain), graduating in 1842, then studied philosophy and theology at the Grand séminaire (Major seminary) of Autun (Saône-et-Loire), his home diocese. He was ordained to the Catholic priesthood December 19, 1846, by Autun Bishop Bénigne-Urbain-Jean-Marie du Trousset d'Héricourt.

Over the next 18 years Pernin held diocesan assignments in the diocese of Autun: St. Pierre, Mâcon, December 1846 – January 1851; chaplain of Collège d'Autun 1851–1853; and St. Just, Rancy, February 1863 – February 1864. At a time when thousands of French priests were leaving France to work as missionaries abroad all over the world, including in North America, Pernin departed France as a diocesan missionary to the United States in September 1864.

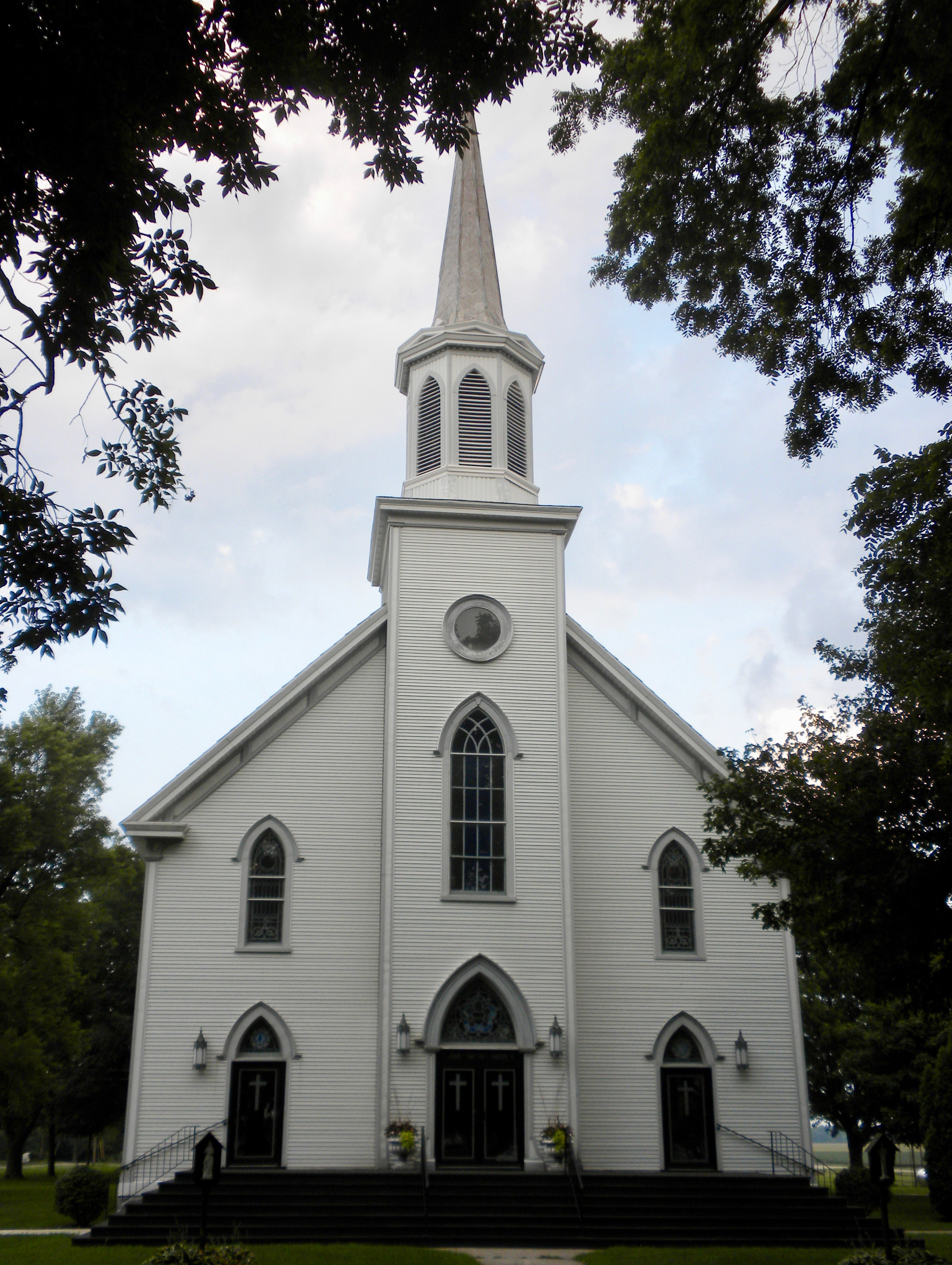
St. John the Baptist Church, L'Erable, Illinois (1856–1874)

== Missionary career in America ==
=== Illinois ===
Pernin came to America at the invitation of Chicago bishop James Duggan, who was concerned to reconcile French-speaking Catholics in Chicago, alienated by his predecessor Anthony O'Regan, and to counteract the influence of anti-Catholic evangelist Charles Chiniquy, who was leading French-Canadian-American Catholics into the Presbyterian Church. From October 1864 to March 1868 Pernin was pastor at St. John the Baptist, L'Erable, Iroquois County, Illinois, 15 miles from Chiniquy's church in St. Anne.

=== Wisconsin ===
Pernin left Illinois for the new diocese of Green Bay, Wisconsin, established in 1868, in the period of Duggan's mental decline that led to his removal from office in April 1869. In ten years in the diocese of Green Bay Pernin was pastor of St. Joseph's, Robinsonville, December 1868 to September 1869; St. Peter's, Oconto, August 1869 to December 1869; Assumption of the Blessed Virgin Mary, Peshtigo and St. Patrick's, Marinette (renamed Our Lady of Lourdes by Pernin in June 1873), December 1869 to September 1875; and Sts. Peter and Paul, Grand Rapids (now Wisconsin Rapids in the diocese of La Crosse, Wisconsin), September 1875 to October 1878.

=== Minnesota ===
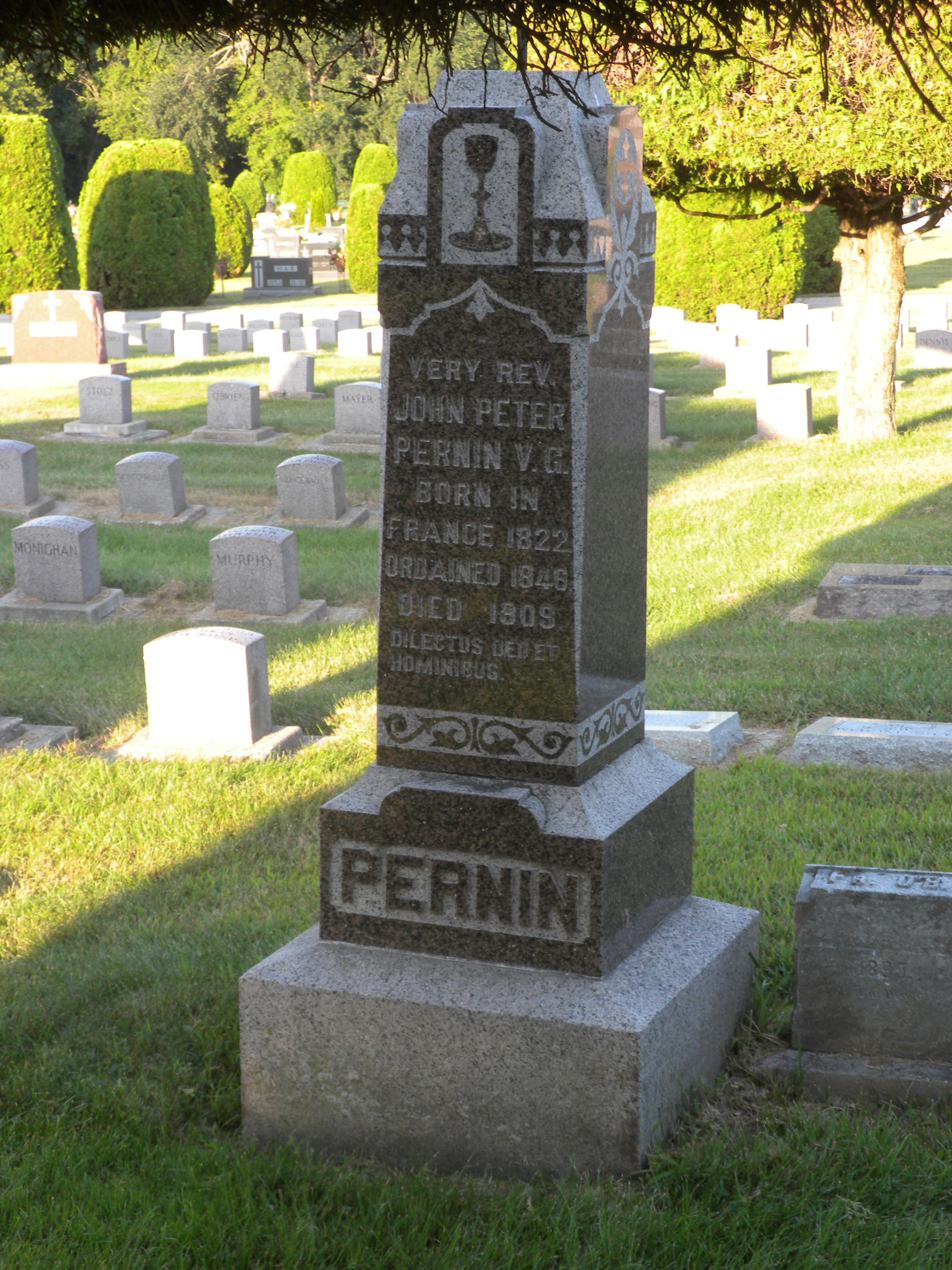
Pernin's grave, Calvary Cemetery, Rochester, Minnesota

Pernin spent his last 31 years in Minnesota in the dioceses of St. Paul and Winona (now Winona-Rochester): Church of the Crucifixion, La Crescent, 1878 to 1886; St. Patrick's, Brownsville, 1886 to 1894; St. Bridget's, Simpson 1894 to 1897; and St. Joseph's, Rushford 1897 to 1898. After the diocese of Winona was established in 1889, broken off from that of St. Paul, its first bishop Joseph Cotter named Pernin its first vicar general, the diocese's highest office after the bishop.

In 1898, upon Pernin's retirement from regular parish ministry and as vicar general, Cotter named him the first regularly appointed resident chaplain of St. Mary's Hospital, Rochester, from which developed the institution now known as Mayo Clinic. Pernin died at St. Mary's on October 9, 1909, aged 87, after 45 years in America. He was buried at St. John's Cemetery (now Calvary Cemetery), Rochester.

== The Great Peshtigo Fire and The Finger of God Is There! ==
In October 1871 Pernin was Catholic pastor of Peshtigo and Marinette, Wisconsin, neighboring logging towns on Green Bay. Occasioned by a summer long drought and carelessness with fire in a forest surrounding a town constructed of wood and strewn with logging debris, a disaster now known as the Great Peshtigo Fire engulfed Peshtigo on the night of October 8–9, completely burning the town and killing upwards of 1500 people, the deadliest wildfire in American history. Pernin survived the fire with hundreds of others, entering the Peshtigo River about 10 pm and submerging and splashing themselves in the water for five and a half hours.

Pernin's church and priest house in Peshtigo were burned in the fire. He also lost his church, priest house, and school building in the Menekaunee area of Marinette when fires burned Menekaunee while veering away from downtown Marinette to the west. As a fundraiser to support the rebuilding of his parish facilities, particularly his church in Marinette, which he was renaming Our Lady of Lourdes, he conceived the idea of writing about his experiences of surviving the fire.

He wrote his memoir in French and traveled to Montreal in April 1874 to arrange for its publication as well as a translation in English. By June 1874 it had been published by Montreal publisher Eusèbe Senécal as Le doigt de Dieu est là! ou Episode émouvant d'un événement étrange raconté par un témoin oculaire and simultaneously by Montreal publisher John Lovell as The Finger of God Is There! or A Moving Episode of a Strange Event Told By An Eyewitness.

When Pernin returned to Marinette in October 1874 from his trip to Montreal to publish his book, he found that he was in trouble with diocesan authorities for having spent too long a time away and had been disciplined with suspension from ministry. Pernin was reinstated in July 1875.

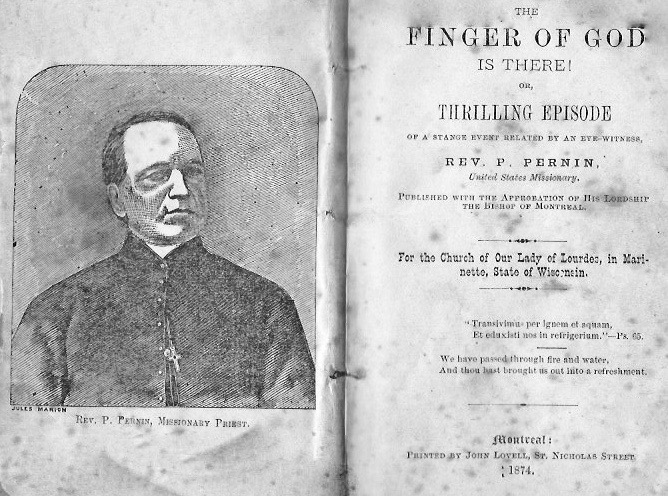
Title page of John Lovell's English version of The Finger of God Is There! (Montreal 1874)

== The Robinsonville apparition ==
In Le Doigt de Dieu est là! / The Finger of God Is There! Pernin viewed the fire from a religious and theological perspective, as the original title suggests. His interpretation of the disaster was in some respects influenced by the Calvinism he knew in the United States. He had been impressed by a lecture he heard in December 1871 in Terre Haute, Indiana, given by Rev. John L. Gay, rector of St. James Episcopal Church, Vincennes, Indiana, to the effect that the fires of October were "image du feu qui doit dévorer la terre à la fin des temps / image of the fire that must devour the earth at the end of time." Peshtigo, according to Pernin, with its many saloons and bordellos serving lumbermen on the Wisconsin logging frontier, was "la Sodome moderne pour servir d'exemple à tous / the modern Sodom meant to serve as an example to all." The Peshtigo fire was God's fire and brimstone sent down to punish a sinful city.

Pernin also recognized a positive divine intervention in two seemingly miraculous occurrences the night of the Wisconsin fires: the fact that his church's tabernacle was preserved during the Peshtigo fire, which he had pulled to the river in a carriage (voiture) and had immersed in the water, and also in the fact that the shrine and religious community of Our Lady of Good Help in Robinsonville entirely escaped the effects of the fires on the Door Peninsula on the same night.

Pernin's text is important, early evidence not only for the Peshtigo fire but also for the events of Robinsonville (now Champion). A French-speaking Belgian immigrant to the Door Peninsula named Adele Brice experienced an apparition of the Virgin Mary in 1859 near her family's farm in Robinsonville. This led her to found there a shrine and religious community to provide religious instruction to uncatechized Belgian children.

Pernin had been Brice's pastor during his time in St. Joseph's, Robinsonville, in 1868–69. In an Appendix to Finger of God Pernin tells what he knew about the Marian apparition from Brice, as well as reporting that while the fires of October 8–9 burned much of the Door Peninsula to the east of Green Bay, they bypassed precisely the community and buildings of Our Lady of Good Help, seemingly in response to the prayers of the community trapped in the conflagration. Pernin interpreted the fact that the shrine should have burned, but did not, as an intervention of the finger of God and as a vindication of Brice's claim that the Virgin Mary had appeared there.

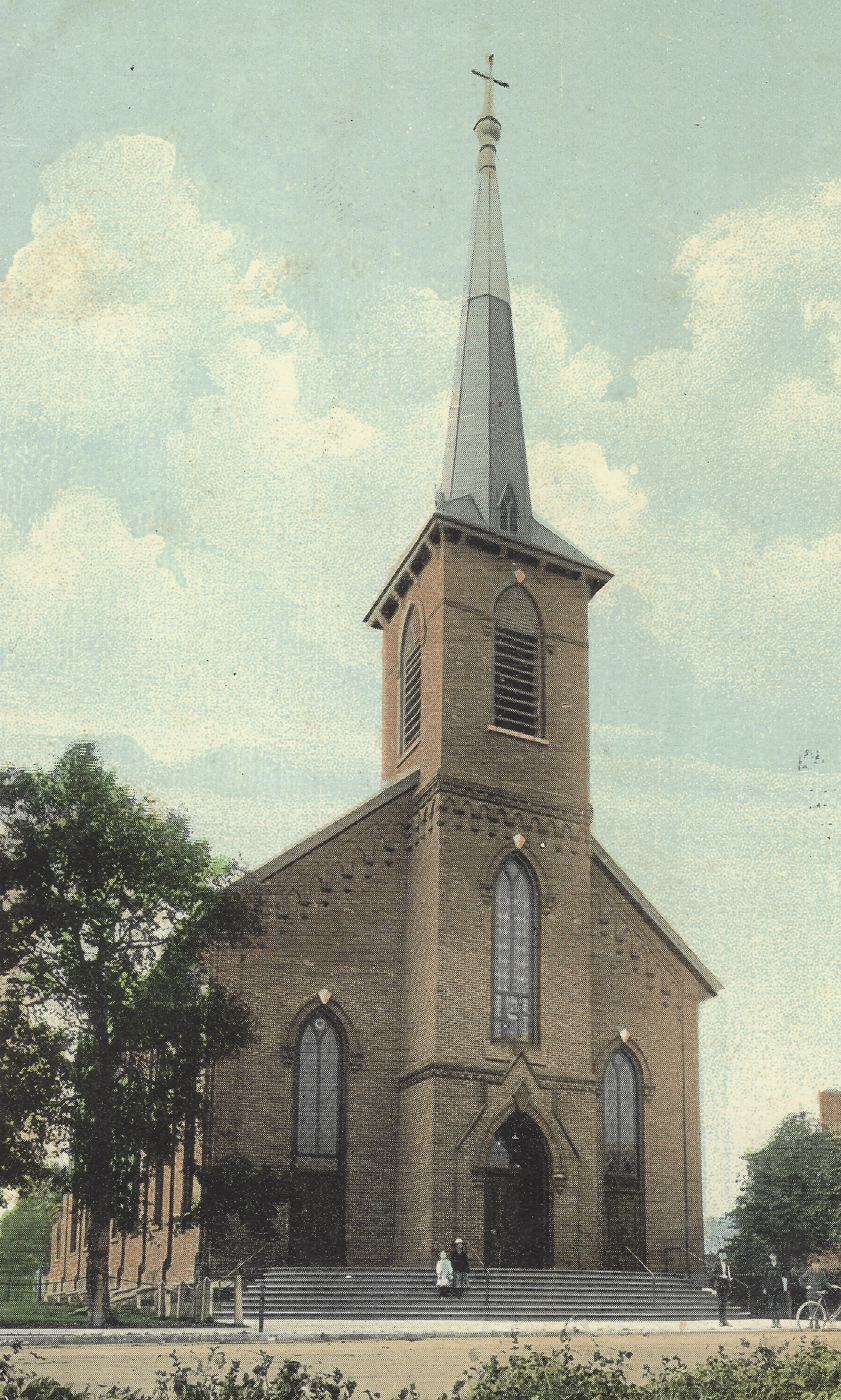
The Finger of God Is There! was written to support construction of Our Lady of Lourdes Church, Marinette, Wisconsin, which was completed in 1876, seen here in a 1905 postcard. Pernin commissioned German church architect Adolphus Druiding to design it. The church was razed in 1978.

While Pernin judged the preservation of his tabernacle in Peshtigo and sparing of the shine at Robinsonville to be interventions of God's power, he was also cautious about calling them miraculous:

En racontant le fait qui précède, je n'ai nullement l'intention de rappeler un miracle, pas plus que je n'appelle miracle, la préservation de mon tabernacle au milieu du feu de Peshtigo. L'un et l'autre de ces faits m'ont édifié et en les redisant ici je n'ai pas d'autre but que d'édifier les autres.

By relating the preceding event I have absolutely no intention of calling it a miracle, any more than I am calling a miracle the preservation of my tabernacle in the midst of the Peshtigo fire. Each of these events edified me and as I retell them here I have no other aim than to edify others.

In 2010 Green Bay bishop David L. Ricken gave official Catholic approval to belief in the Marian apparition, granting it the status of "worthy of belief."

== Heritage of Pernin's memoir ==
Three substantial but incomplete republications of Lovell's English translation of Pernin's Le Doigt de Dieu est là! by the Wisconsin Historical Society in 1918, 1971, and 1999 made Pernin a figure important to the story of the Peshtigo fire. Pernin's French original has been little known before being republished for the first time in 2021.

The Wisconsin Historical Society's first reprinting in 1918 omitted passages "dealing largely with matters of Catholic faith" and pertaining "to the religious reflections and ideas of the author." The reprintings in 1971 and 1999 continued those omissions and changed the title from The Finger of God is There!, a Biblical allusion (Exodus 31.18, Luke 11.20), to The Great Peshtigo Fire. Because of the editorial decision to de-emphasize Pernin's religious material, it has been little known that Pernin's, together with that of Eliza Ellen Starr in Patron Saints (1871), is the earliest account of the claimed Robinsonville Marian apparition and fire miracle.

Writers on wildland fires and forest ecology continue to mention Pernin, who provides evidence for deforestation, urbanization, and the conditions for wildfire in nineteenth century America. Peter Leschak, in a memoir of his experiences as a firefighter, Ghosts of the Fireground: Echoes of the Great Peshtigo Fire and the Calling of a Wildland Firefighter (2003), interwove his own story with Pernin's. The professional firefighter admired how Pernin, as an amateur without knowing it, followed Standard Fire Order #6: "Stay alert, keep calm, think clearly, act decisively." Leschak recalled James Russell Lowell: "All the beautiful sentiments in the world weigh less than a single lovely action... On the banks of the Peshtigo River, on the verge of bursting into a human torch, Father Pernin was lovely and magnificent."

== Bibliography ==
=== Editions of Le Doigt de Dieu est là! / The Finger of God Is There! ===
- Mercier, Charles E., ed. (2021). Peshtigo 1871: Peter Pernin's Peshtigo Fire Memoir The Finger of God Is There!. New York: TBR Books.
- Pernin, Reverend Peter (1999). The Great Peshtigo Fire; An Eyewitness Account. Madison, Wisconsin: Wisconsin Historical Society Press.
- Pernin, Reverend Peter (1971). The Great Peshtigo Fire; An Eyewitness Account. Madison, Wisconsin: Wisconsin Historical Society Press.
- Pernin, Reverend Peter (1971). "The Great Peshtigo Fire; An Eyewitness Account". Wisconsin Magazine of History. 54: 246–272.
- Pernin, Reverend P. (1918–1919). "The Finger of God is There". Wisconsin Magazine of History. 2: 158–180, 274–293.
- Pernin, Reverend P., United States Missionary (1874). The finger of God is there!, or, Thrilling episode of a strange event related by an eye-witness. Montreal: John Lovell.
- Pernin, L'abbé, Missionnaire aux États Unis (1874). Le Doigt de Dieu Est Là!: Ou Episode Emouvant d'un Évènement Étrange Raconté par un Témoin Oculaire. Montreal: Eusèbe Senécal.

=== Secondary Works ===
- Boatman, John F. (1998). "...And the River Flows On..." Memories from a Wisconsin–Michigan Border Town: the Marinette, Wisconsin Area (Vol. 1) and From the creation of Marinette County until Marinette becomes a city in 1887 (Vol. 2). University of Wisconsin – Milwaukee.
- Brettell, Caroline B. (2015). Following Father Chiniquy: Immigration, Religious Schism, and Social Change in Nineteenth-Century Illinois. Southern Illinois University Press.
- Crozier, William L. (1989). Gathering a people: A history of the Diocese of Winona Diocese of Winona. Winona, Minnesota: Diocese of Winona.
- Chiniquy, Charles (1886). Fifty Years in the Church of Rome. Chicago: Fleming H. Revell.
- Dominica, Sister M., OSF (1955). The Chapel: Our Lady of Good Help. De Pere, Wisconsin: Journal Publishing Co.
- Engel, Dave (June 18, 2007a). "Peter & Paul had French connection". Wisconsin Rapids Tribune.
- Engel, Dave (June 25, 2007b). "Local priest witnessed major events". Wisconsin Rapids Tribune.
- Gess, Denise; Lutz, William (2003). Firestorm at Peshtigo: A Town, Its People, and the Deadliest Fire in American History. New York: Macmillan.
- Essertel, Yannick (2001). L'aventure missionnaire lyonnaise. Paris: Cerf.
- Hampton, Roy A. III (1997). "German Gothic in the Midwest: The Parish Churches of Franz Georg Himpler and Adolphus Druiding". U.S. Catholic Historian. 15: 51–74.
- Johnson, Benjamin Heber (2017). Escaping the Dark, Gray City: Fear and Hope in Progressive-era Conservation. Yale University Press.
- Leschak, Peter M. (2003). Ghosts of the Fireground: Echoes of the Great Peshtigo Fire and the Calling of a Wildland Firefighter. New York: HarperOne.
- Michon, Jacques (1994). "Senécal, Eusèbe". Dictionary of Canadian Biography. Vol. 13. University of Toronto/Université Laval.
- Park, Karen E. (2012). "The Negotiation of Authority at a Frontier Marian Apparition Site: Adele Brise and Our Lady of Good Help". American Catholic Studies. 123 (3): 1–26. doi:10.1353/acs.2012.0029. S2CID 143602168.
- Parker, George L. (1990). "Lovell, John". Dictionary of Canadian Biography. Vol. 12. University of Toronto/Université Laval.
- Pasquier, Michael (2010). Fathers on the Frontier: French Missionaries and the Roman Catholic Priesthood in the United States, 1789–1870. Oxford University Press.
- Price, W. J. (1959–1960). "Aux origines d'un schisme: le centenaire d'une réconciliation avortée". Revue d'histoire de l'Amérique française. 12–13: 517–534, 45–78. doi:10.7202/301934ar.
- Ricken, Most Reverend David Laurin (December 8, 2010). Decree on the Authenticity of the Apparitions of 1859 at the Shrine of Our Lady of Good Help (PDF) (Report). Diocese of Green Bay.
- Rutkow, Eric (2012). American Canopy: Trees, Forests, and the Making of a Nation. New York: Scribner.
- Sandlin, Lee (2013). Storm Kings: The Untold History of America's First Tornado Chasers. New York: Random House. Bibcode:2013skuh.book.....S.
- Villerbu, Tangi (2011). "Missionnaires catholiques français aux États-Unis, 1791–1920". Histoire et missions chrétiennes. 17: 5–14.
