= Chiniquy =

Chiniquy is a surname. Notable people with the name include:

- Charles Chiniquy (1809–1899), Canadian Catholic priest who left the Catholic Church and became a Presbyterian minister. He rode the lecture circuit in the United States denouncing the Catholic Church warning of "plots by the Vatican" to take control of the United States
- Gerry Chiniquy (1912–1989), American film animator
