= Adele Brice =

Belgian-born American Marian visionary

Servant of God Adele Brice T.O.S.F.
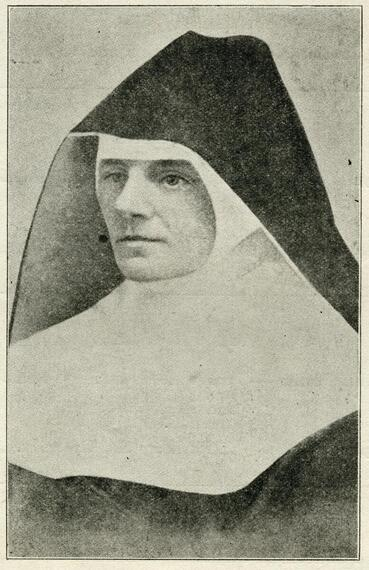
- Portrait of Adele Brice (ca. 1860)
- Born: Marie Adèle Joseph Brise; January 30, 1831; Dion-le-Val, Province of Brabant, Belgium
- Residence: Champion, Wisconsin, United States
- Died: July 5, 1896 (aged 65); Champion, Wisconsin, United States
- Venerated in: Catholic Church (United States)
- Major shrine: National Shrine of Our Lady of Champion

Adele Brice, T.O.S.F. (January 30, 1831 – July 5, 1896) was a Belgian-born American Catholic laywoman and Marian visionary who reported a series of visions of the Blessed Virgin Mary in 1859 in what is now Champion, Wisconsin, then a rural Belgian Catholic settlement.

Following these reported apparitions, Brice established a small chapel and school at the site. In 2010, the Roman Catholic Diocese of Green Bay formally declared the apparitions “worthy of belief”, making it the first Marian apparition site in the United States to receive such approval from the Catholic Church. The chapel was raised to the status of a national shrine by the United States Conference of Catholic Bishops in 2016.

Brice devoted much of her life to teaching among Belgian immigrants in northeastern Wisconsin, traveling from settlement to settlement to provide instruction to children and later organizing a small community of women living according to the rule of the Third Order of Saint Francis in Champion, Wisconsin. In 2026, the Roman Catholic Diocese of Green Bay opened her cause for canonization, granting her the title of Servant of God.

== Early life ==
Marie Adèle Joseph Brise, was born on January 30, 1831, in Dion-le-Val, Walloon Brabant, Belgium, to Lambert and Catherine Brice. According to later accounts, she suffered an accident involving lye in childhood that left her disfigured and blind in one eye. She was influenced by the Sisters of Providence of the Immaculate Conception in the nearby Belgian town of Champion, who prepared children in the area for their First Communion, and expressed a desire to join their teaching ministry.

That plan was interrupted when her family decided to emigrate to the United States. After seeking advice from a priest, Brice agreed to follow her parents' wishes hoping that she could become a teacher in the United States. In August 1855, Brice emigrated to a farm on the Door Peninsula with her parents, her sisters Esperance and Isabelle, and her brother Vital, settling in what would be named Champion, Wisconsin at her suggestion. The area developed into one of the largest center of Belgian immigration in the United States. Life for the Belgian settlers was difficult and many struggled to survive due to the harsh winters and rugged terrain. Brice helped support her family by doing farm work and household chores. According to contemporary and later accounts, she noticed that, although the Belgian settlers were predominantly Catholic, many of them were drifting away from the Catholic faith due to their isolation from the institutions of the Catholic Church.

=== The Apparition ===
In early October 1859, Brice was heading to the local gristmill with her family's grain. She was to report later that she had seen a woman clothed in dazzling white, a yellow sash around her waist, and a crown of stars on her flowing blonde locks. The lady was surrounded by a bright light, and stood between two trees, a hemlock and a maple. Brice was frightened by this vision and prayed until it disappeared. When she told her parents what she had seen, they suggested that a poor soul might be in need of prayers.

A few days later, on what is believed to have been Sunday, October 9, 1859, Brice was walking to Mass with one of her sisters and a friend. The church was 10 miles away from her home in the community of Bay Settlement, but she made the journey every Sunday, no matter the weather. On her way there, she again saw the mysterious lady standing in the same spot between the two trees. Brice, however, being the only one to see her, she and her companions continued their journey to Mass.

After Mass, Brice spoke to her parish priest, who instructed her that, if the lady were to appear to her again, she was to ask, “In God’s name, who are you and what do you want of me?”.

While returning from the church, Brice saw the apparition a third time, whom her companions were still unable to see, and this time posed the question the priest had told her to ask. The apparition replied, "I am the Queen of Heaven, who prays for the conversion of sinners, and I wish you to do the same." Brice was also given a mission to "gather the children in this wild country and teach them what they should know for salvation."

== Later life ==
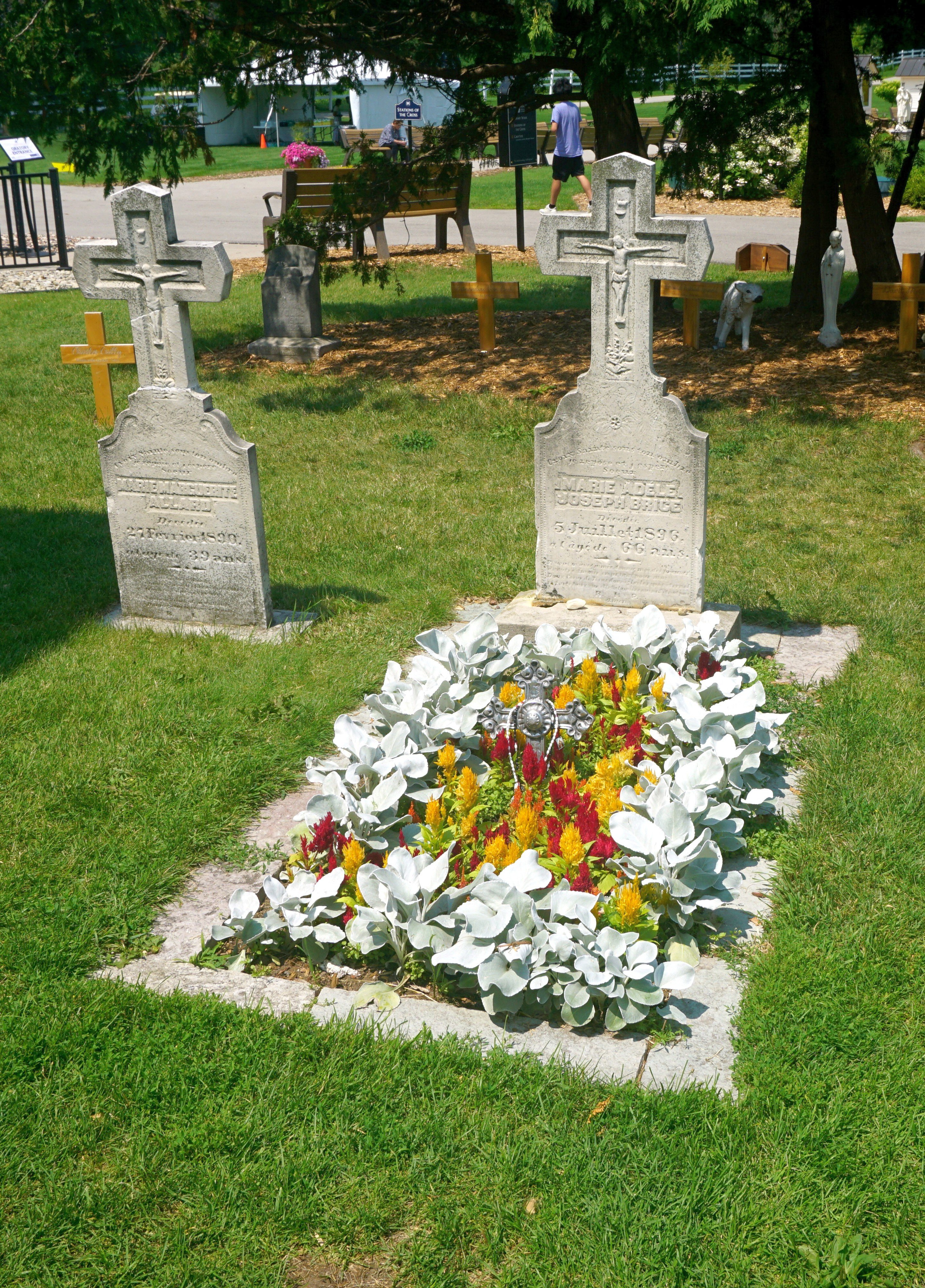
Grave of Adele Brice at the National Shrine of Our Lady of Champion (2025)

Brice, who was aged 28 at the time of the apparitions, arranged to acquire the land where the apparitions had taken place, and to have a small log chapel built to honor the apparitions. As news of the apparitions spread, people began to flock to the chapel, seeking the good help of the Virgin Mary. As the Belgian immigrants had a culturally derived devotion to Mary under the title of Notre Dame de Bon Secours, she dedicated the chapel to Our Lady of Good Help.

She devoted the rest of her life to teaching children. She initially traveled on foot from house to house, but later opened a small school. Other women joined her in her work and formed a community of women living under the Rule of the Third Order of Saint Francis, who wore religious habits and followed the life of a religious institute although they did not take vows as Religious Sisters. In 1864, she and her companions set up in a farmhouse not far from the wooden chapel that marked the location of Mary’s apparitions. There, they centralized their apostolate to one location so children could live and learn there. Through the help of many local townspeople, a small school and convent was built of wood frame construction. Life, however, was very challenging. The members of her little community and their students were frequently short of food, as parents would often drop their children off and not pay their bills. Brice never challenged them and would simply ask her companions to pray a novena to request God's help for their needs. Each time, a delivery of food would arrive the following morning.

At one point the local Diocese of Green Bay received a new bishop who, although he knew nothing personally of Brice and her activities, had heard about vendors creating a rowdy atmosphere right outside of the boundaries of the shrine property. The bishop decided that, until he had time to investigate the matter fully, it was best to close the school and the chapel until further notice. He demanded that Brice close the facilities and hand over to him the keys to the schoolhouse and chapel. When Brice went to the bishop's office to comply with his order, she reminded him of his responsibility for the souls of those children, especially since they would be lacking their religious instruction. Impressed by her zeal and sincerity, the Bishop returned the keys to her immediately and counseled her to continue her good work.

In 1871, the chapel became the site of what is considered to be the miraculous survival of hundreds of residents from the massive destruction of the Peshtigo fire, who had taken refuge from the fires on the grounds of the chapel. The Rev. Peter Pernin, in his eyewitness account, states that the shrine property was the only land spared from the fires for millions of acres around. It then gained the reputation for being a site of healing and protection.

Brice died at the chapel on July 5, 1896 and was buried in a cemetery on the grounds of the shrine.

== Veneration ==
Considered a mystic by the local population, Brice was acclaimed as the "Seer of Champion" during her lifetime. It was not until 2010 that the Diocese of Green Bay officially declared Brice's visions as "worthy of belief" by the Christian faithful (Declaratio de supernaturalitate) and the chapel recognized as a diocesan shrine due to its long history as a place of pilgrimage and prayer.

The shrine became the first and only site in the United States of an approved Marian apparition. It was entrusted to the care of the Fathers of Mercy the following year. It was raised to the status of a national shrine by the United States Conference of Catholic Bishops in 2016.

On January 30, 2026, David Ricken, the Bishop of Green Bay, formally opened the cause for Brice's beatification and canonization and declared her a Servant of God.
