= Champion, Namur =

Sub-municipality of Namur, Belgium

Champion Tchampion (Walloon)
- Sub-municipality of Namur
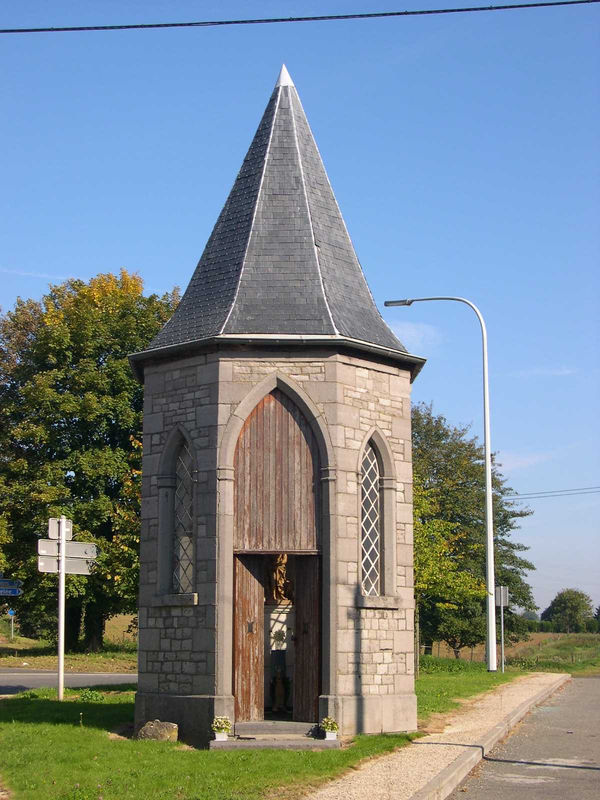
- Saint Roch Chapel

- Location of Champion in Namur
- Interactive map of Champion
- Location within Belgium Location within Namur Province
- Coordinates: 50°29′00″N 4°54′00″E
- Country: Belgium
- Community: French Community
- Region: Wallonia
- Province: Namur
- Arrondissement: Namur
- Municipality: Namur

Area
  - Total: 4.45 km^{2} (1.72 sq mi)

Population (2020-01-01)
  - Total: 1,730
  - Density: 389/km^{2} (1,010/sq mi)
- Postal codes: 5020
- Area codes: 081

Champion (French pronunciation: [ʃɑ̃pjɔ̃]; Walloon: Tchampion) is a sub-municipality of the city of Namur located in the province of Namur, Wallonia, Belgium. It was a separate municipality until 1977. On 1 January 1977, it was merged into Namur.

The unincorporated area of Champion in Green Bay, Wisconsin in the United States was named for this town by Adele Brice, an emigré from that region; it hosts a shrine to a Marian apparition she experienced there.
