= Charles Chiniquy =

Canadian Presbyterian minister and activist (1809–1899)

The Reverend Charles Chiniquy
- Temperance Apostle; Pastor of the "First Presbyterian Church of St. Anne"
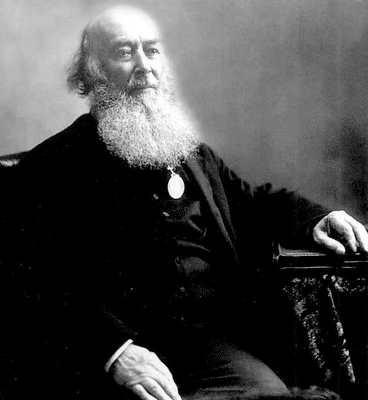
- Church: Catholic Church (1809-58); Presbyterianism (1858-99); └─ Orange Order └─ PCUSA └─ PCC
- Diocese: Quebec (1832-47); Montréal (1847[?]-52); Chicago (1851-58)
- Other posts: Founder of the Temperance Society, Beauport (1839)
- Previous posts: Catholic Priest in Canada: Curate of St. Charles Parish (1833-34), and St. Roch Parish (1834-38), Quebec; Vicar of Beauport (1838-42) and Kamouraska (1842-47); Temperance Preacher (1847-52); Missionary in Kankakee County, Illinois, USA

Orders
- Ordination: 18 May 1832 (as Catholic deacon) by Joseph Signay; 21 September 1833 (as Catholic priest) by Joseph Signay; 1 February 1860 (as Presbyterian minister)
- Laicized: 1858 (left the Catholic Church)

Personal details
- Born: Charles Paschal Telesphore Chiniquy; 30 July 1809 Kamouraska, Lower Canada (now in Bas-Saint-Laurent, Quebec, Canada)
- Died: 16 January 1899 (aged 89) Montreal, Quebec, Post-Confederation Canada (now Canada)
- Buried: Mount Royal Cemetery, Montreal, Quebec, Canada; 45.50940229637065°N 73.59699046093925°W
- Parents: Marie-Reine Perreault (mother); Charles Chiniquy (father)
- Spouse: Euphémie Allard (m. 1864)
- Children: 3
- Occupation: Clergyman, Writer
- Education: Doctor of Divinity (D.D.)
- Alma mater: Nicolet Seminary; Grand Séminaire, Quebec City
- Motto: "Ye are all brethren, the children of God"

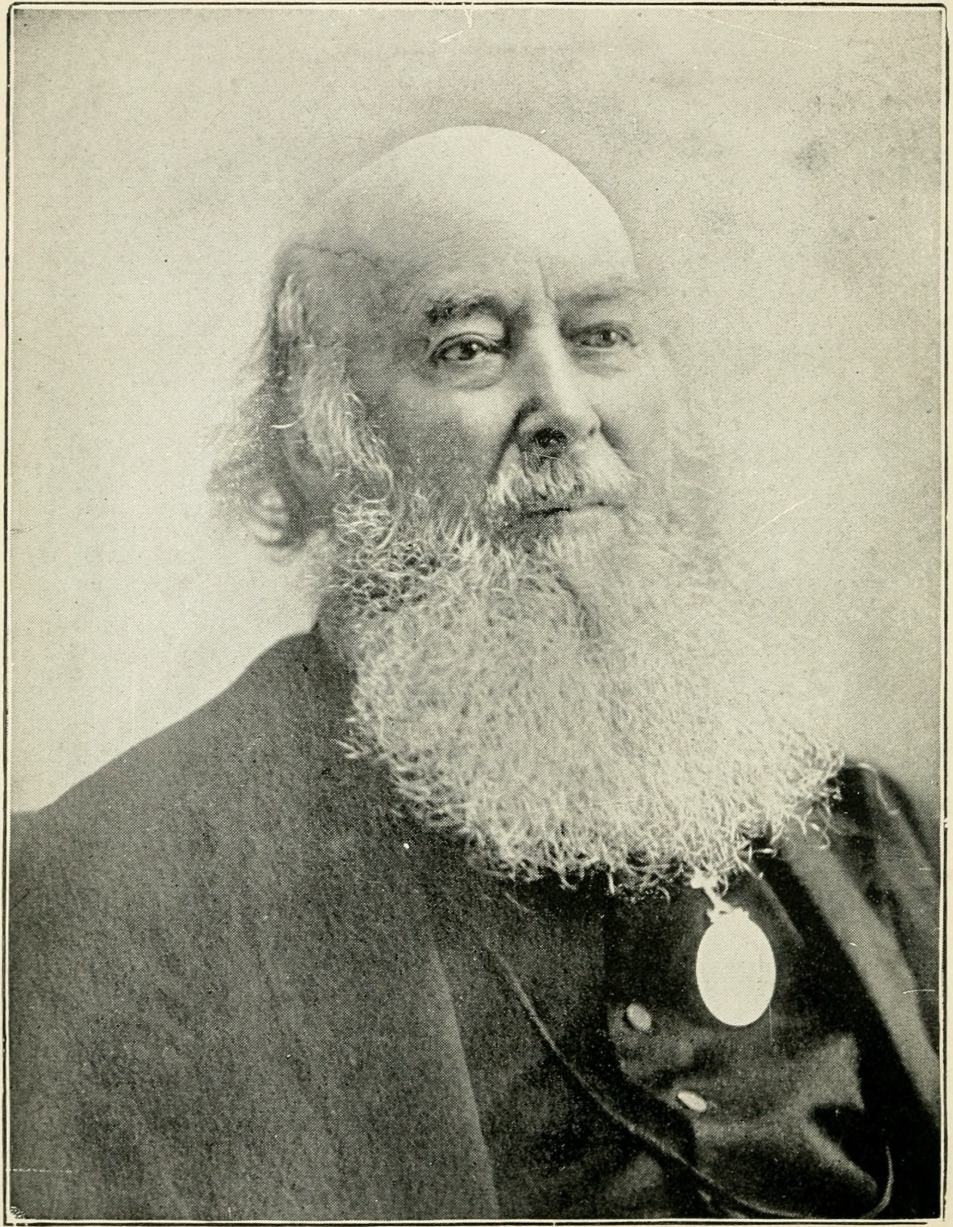
Charles Chiniquy (1886)

Charles Paschal Telesphore Chiniquy (30 July 1809 – 16 January 1899) was a Canadian socio-political activist, conspiracy theorist, and former Roman Catholic priest who left the Catholic Church and converted to Protestant Christianity, becoming a Presbyterian minister. He later rode the lecture circuit in the United States, denouncing the Catholic Church. His themes were that Catholicism was pagan, that Catholics worship the Virgin Mary, and that its theology was anti-Christian.

Chiniquy founded the St. Anne Colony, a village located in Kankakee County, Illinois in 1851. Fifty Years in the Church of Rome, an extensive autobiographical account of his life and thoughts as a priest in the Catholic Church, was written by Chiniquy and published in 1886. He warned of plots by the Vatican to take control of the United States by importing Catholic immigrants from Ireland, Germany, and France, and suggested that the Vatican was behind the assassination of U.S. President Abraham Lincoln.

== Biography ==
Chiniquy was born in 1809 to a French-Canadian family in the village of Kamouraska, Quebec. He lost his father at an early age and was adopted by his uncle. As a young man, Chiniquy studied to become a Catholic priest at the Petit Séminaire de Québec in Nicolet, Quebec. He was ordained in 1833; after his ordination, he served his church in Quebec. During the 1840s, he led a campaign throughout Quebec against the consumption of alcohol and drunkenness.

Later he immigrated to Illinois in the United States. In 1855, Chiniquy was sued by a prominent Catholic layman named Peter Spink in Kankakee, Illinois. After the fall court term, Spink applied for a change of venue to the court in Urbana, Illinois. Chiniquy hired the then-lawyer Abraham Lincoln, the future 16th President of the United States, to defend him. The spring court action in Urbana was the highest profile libel suit in Lincoln's career. The case was ended in the fall court session by agreement.

Chiniquy clashed with the Bishop of Chicago, Anthony O'Regan, over the bishop's treatment of Catholics in the city, particularly French Canadians. He asserted that O'Regan was secretly backing Spink's suit against him. Chiniquy said that in 1856, O'Regan had threatened him with excommunication if he did not go to a new location where the bishop wanted to assign him. As Chiniquy refused to head that reassignment, O'Regan suspended and several months later excommunicated him in a pastoral letter, also published by The New York Times. Chiniquy disputed this decision, publicly calling the bishop mistaken. Chiniquy left the Catholic Church in 1858, and subsequently converted to Protestant Christianity, becoming a Presbyterian Evangelical minister in 1860.

He asserted that Catholicism was Pagan, that Catholics worship the Virgin Mary, and that its theology was anti-Christian. He warned of supposed plots by the Vatican to take control of the United States by importing Catholic immigrants from Ireland, Germany, and France. This was at a time of high immigration rates from those countries, in response to social and political upheaval (the Great Famine in Ireland and revolutions in Germany and France). Chiniquy claimed that he was falsely accused by his superiors (and that Abraham Lincoln had come to his rescue), that the American Civil War was a plot against the United States of America by the Vatican, and that the Vatican was behind the Confederate cause, and the assassination of U.S. President Lincoln, and that Lincoln's assassins were faithful Catholics ultimately serving Pope Pius IX.

After leaving the Catholic Church, Chiniquy dedicated his life to preach and evangelize among his fellow French Canadians, as well as other people in Canada and the United States, in order to convert them from Catholicism to Protestant Christianity. He wrote a number of books and tracts expressing his criticism and views on the alleged errors in the faith and practices of the Catholic Church. His two most influential literary works are the autobiography Fifty Years in The Church of Rome and the polemical treatise The Priest, The Woman, and The Confessional. These books raised concerns in the United States about the influence of the Catholic Church. According to one Canadian biographer, Chiniquy is Canada's best-selling author of all time. He joined the Orange Order and said of it: "I always found them staunch and true. I consider it a great honour to be an Orangeman. Every time I go on my knees I pray that God may bless them and make them as numerous and bright as the stars of the heaven above." When Chiniquy visited Hobart in 1879, a riot occurred when hundreds of Catholic opponents forced their way into the lecture hall. The meeting was abandoned and more than five hundred law enforcement personnel were employed for the next meeting, with thousands of protestors outside the building.

In 1864, Chiniquy married Euphémie Allard. The couple had three children together. Chiniquy died in Montreal, Quebec, Canada on January 16, 1899.

== Legacy ==
To this day, some of Chiniquy's works are still promoted among Protestant Christians and Sola scriptura believers. One of his most well-known modern day followers was the American Fundamentalist cartoonist and comic book writer Jack Chick, notable for being the creator of the "Chick tracts"; he also published a comic-form adaptation of Chiniquy's autobiography Fifty Years in The Church of Rome, titled "The Big Betrayal". Chick strongly relied on Chiniquy's claims and books for writing his own anti-Catholic tracts.

== St. Anne Colony ==
Chiniquy, then a Catholic priest, left Canada in the wake of a series of scandals. He was offered a fresh start by James Oliver Van de Velde, Bishop of Chicago, after Ignace Bourget, Bishop of Montreal, asked him to leave in 1851. Chiniquy founded and settled in St. Anne Colony, a village located in Kankakee County, Illinois in 1851. Chiniquy was suspended on 19 August 1856, for public insubordination by Bishop Anthony O'Regan, Van de Velde's successor in Chicago. Because he continued to celebrate Mass and administer the other sacraments, he was excommunicated on 3 September 1856. About two years later, on 3 August 1858, O'Regan's successor, Bishop James Duggan, formally and publicly reconfirmed Chiniquy's excommunication in St. Anne.

Chiniquy had definitively left the Catholic Church in 1858, and subsequently converted to Protestant Christianity in 1860. Along with many followers, he joined the Presbyterian Church in the United States of America (PCUSA). He was admitted as a Presbyterian minister on 1 February 1860. Within two years, Chiniquy, in trouble with the Presbytery of Chicago over his administration of charity funds and a college, according to Elizabeth Ann Kerr McDougall in the Dictionary of Canadian Biography, sought a new connection in order to avoid an expensive presbytery trial. The college is identified in the Seventh Biennial Report of the Superintendent of Public Instruction of the State of Illinois as Saviour's College, founded in 1860; it is listed neither in Universities and Colleges nor Academies and Seminaries of various grades and courses, but in the Theological Seminaries and Church Schools class of institutions. The report states it "is designed to supply the educational wants of the colony brought by Father Chiniquy from Canada to this State, and to prepare men who will be fitted to preach the gospel in the regions whence he came." The report also quotes a description of the school, attributed to correspondence from a Montreal newspaper, unnamed in the report, that people, also unnamed in the report, "examined the day school or college, as the people there delight to call it" and wrote that it had five classes, ranging from students learning the alphabet to students learning the "intricacies of French and English grammar, composition, and the other studies of the school, besides the elements of Algebra, Latin, and Greek."

Alexander F. Kemp was chairman of the Synod of the Canada Presbyterian Church committee that examined Chiniquy's application for admission as a minister. According to Kemp, Chiniquy was involved in both presbytery and civil court proceedings connected with the administration of charitable funds and with what Kemp described as an educational institute. The Presbytery of Chicago charged him with un-ministerial and un-Christian conduct; Chiniquy was expected to answer these charges before the presbytery. At that stage of the proceedings, he and his congregation resolved to separate from the Presbytery of Chicago and the Old School (PCUSA), and to request recognition from the Canada Presbyterian Church. The Presbytery of Chicago charged Chiniquy with misrepresenting that a real college was in operation in St. Anne. After conducting an inquiry, Kemp suggested that Chiniquy and his congregation be admitted into the Canada Presbyterian Church.

In St. Anne, a religious society was incorporated in the state that was named the "Christian Catholic Church at St. Anne". It was classified as a Protestant religious association. Two years later, when it joined the PCUSA in 1860, it took the name of "First Presbyterian Church of St. Anne".

== Archives ==
There is a Charles Chiniquy fonds at Library and Archives Canada. The archival reference number is R7160.
