= Champion, Wisconsin =

- Unincorporated community
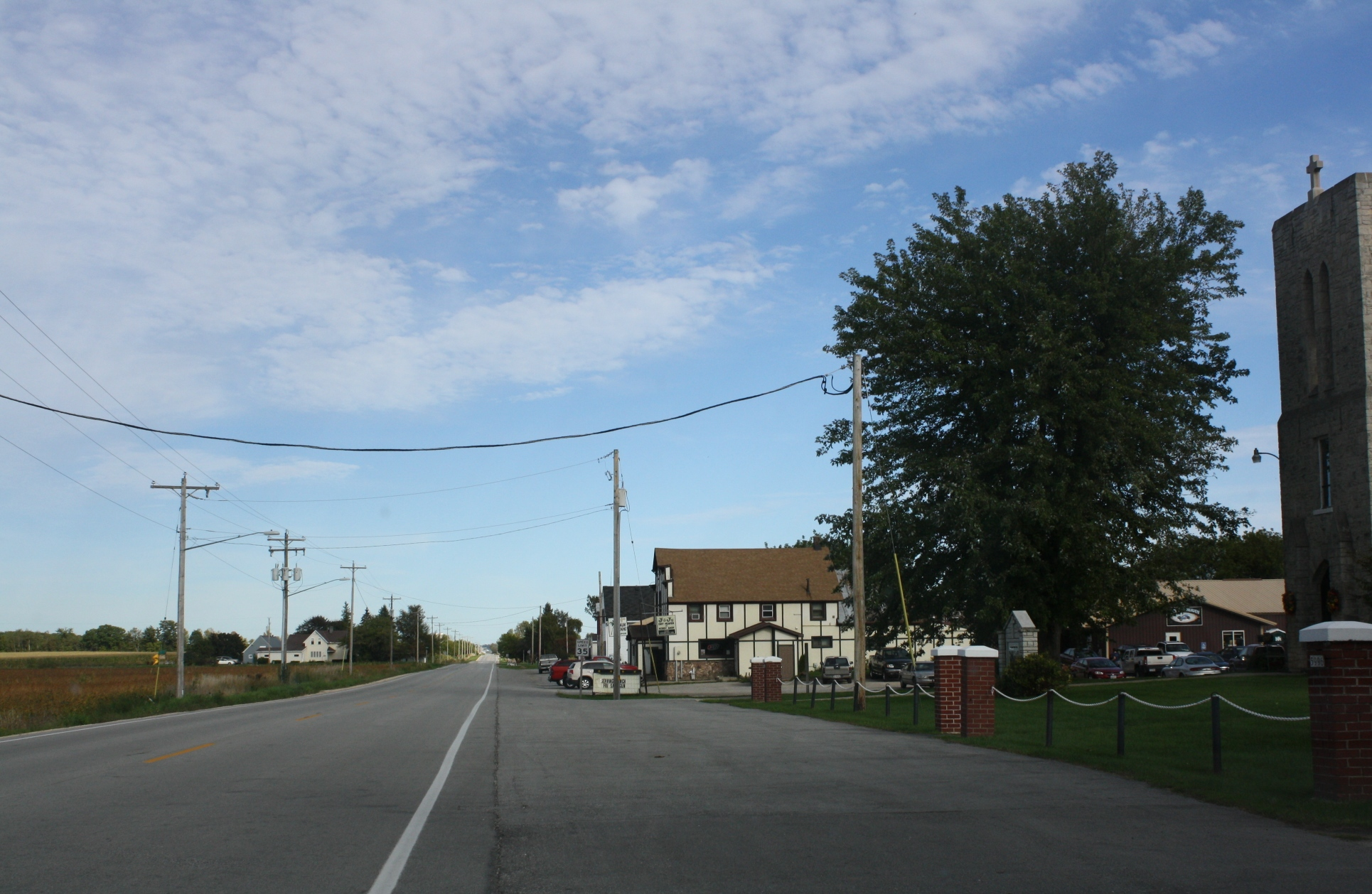
- Looking east at downtown Champion

- Location within Wisconsin Location within the United States
- Coordinates: 44°35′21″N 87°47′39″W
- Country: United States
- State: Wisconsin
- County: Brown
- Town: Green Bay
- Elevation: 771 ft (235 m)
- Time zone: UTC-6 (Central (CST))
  - Summer (DST): UTC-5 (CDT)
- Area code: 920
- GNIS feature ID: 1562939

Champion is an unincorporated community in the town of Green Bay in Brown County, Wisconsin, United States. It is part of the Green Bay Metropolitan Statistical Area. The town hall for the town of Green Bay is located in Champion and the National Shrine of Our Lady of Champion is located just east of Champion.

== History ==
The area was called "Grez-Daems", from 1853 to 1862, named after Belgian priest Father Daems, who is credited with being the founder of the Belgian Colony in Wisconsin. In 1862, the community became known as "Aux Premiers Belges" (The First Belgians). The same area was also known as “Robinsonville”, after Charles D. Robinson, editor of the Green Bay Advocate, an early newspaper started in 1846. The name Robinsonville was given prominence by Adele Brice’s apparitions of the Blessed Virgin Mary in 1858.

When the post office moved to the store and tavern of Mr. Delvaux to be more centrally located, Delvaux said he didn't want the office named after him. The suggestion of “Champion” was from Brise, after a little village near Namur in Belgium where she had planned to join a convent before her family emigrated to the United States.

== Images ==
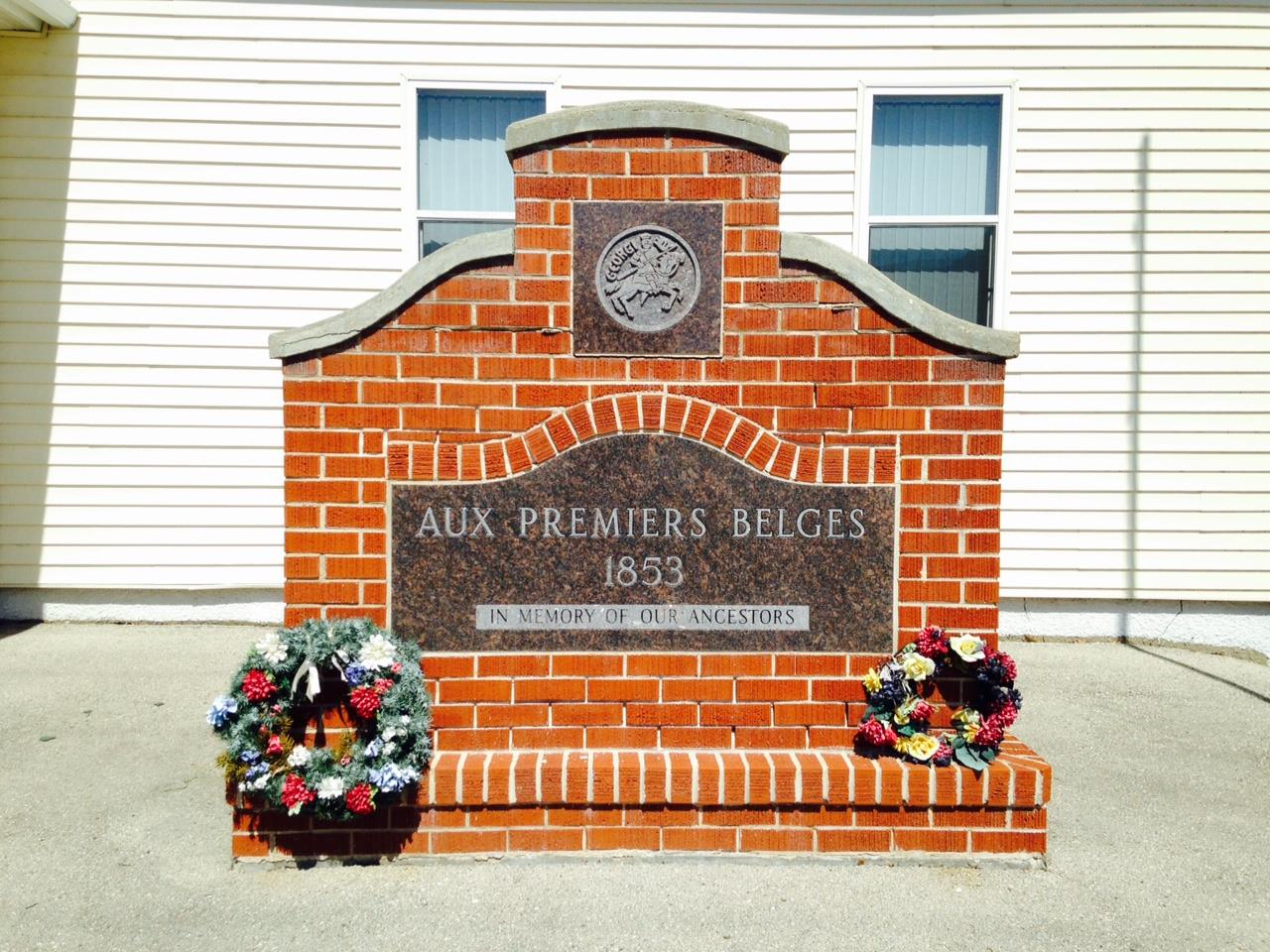
Belgian settlement monument at Green Bay town hall

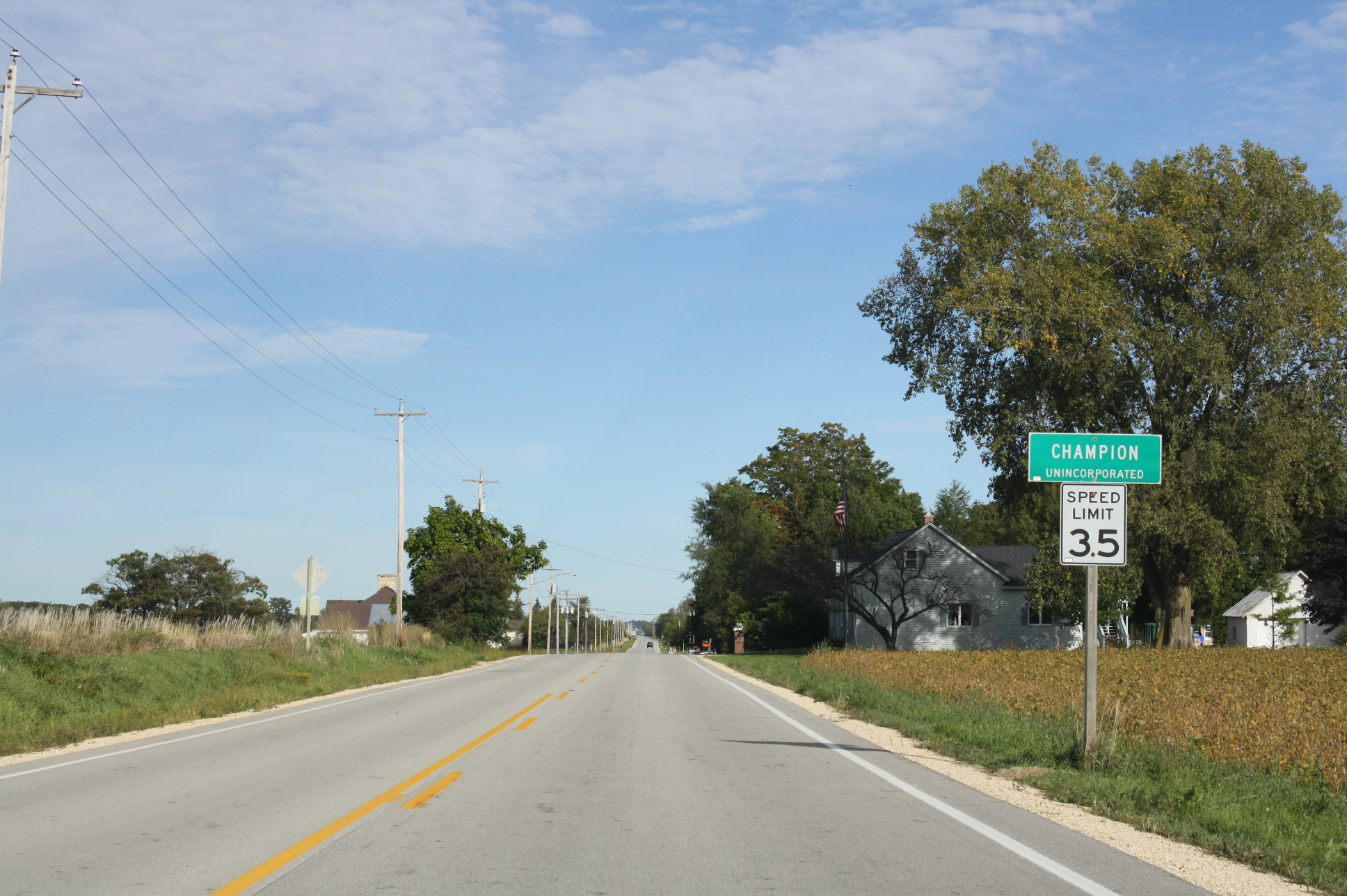
Looking east at Champion's sign

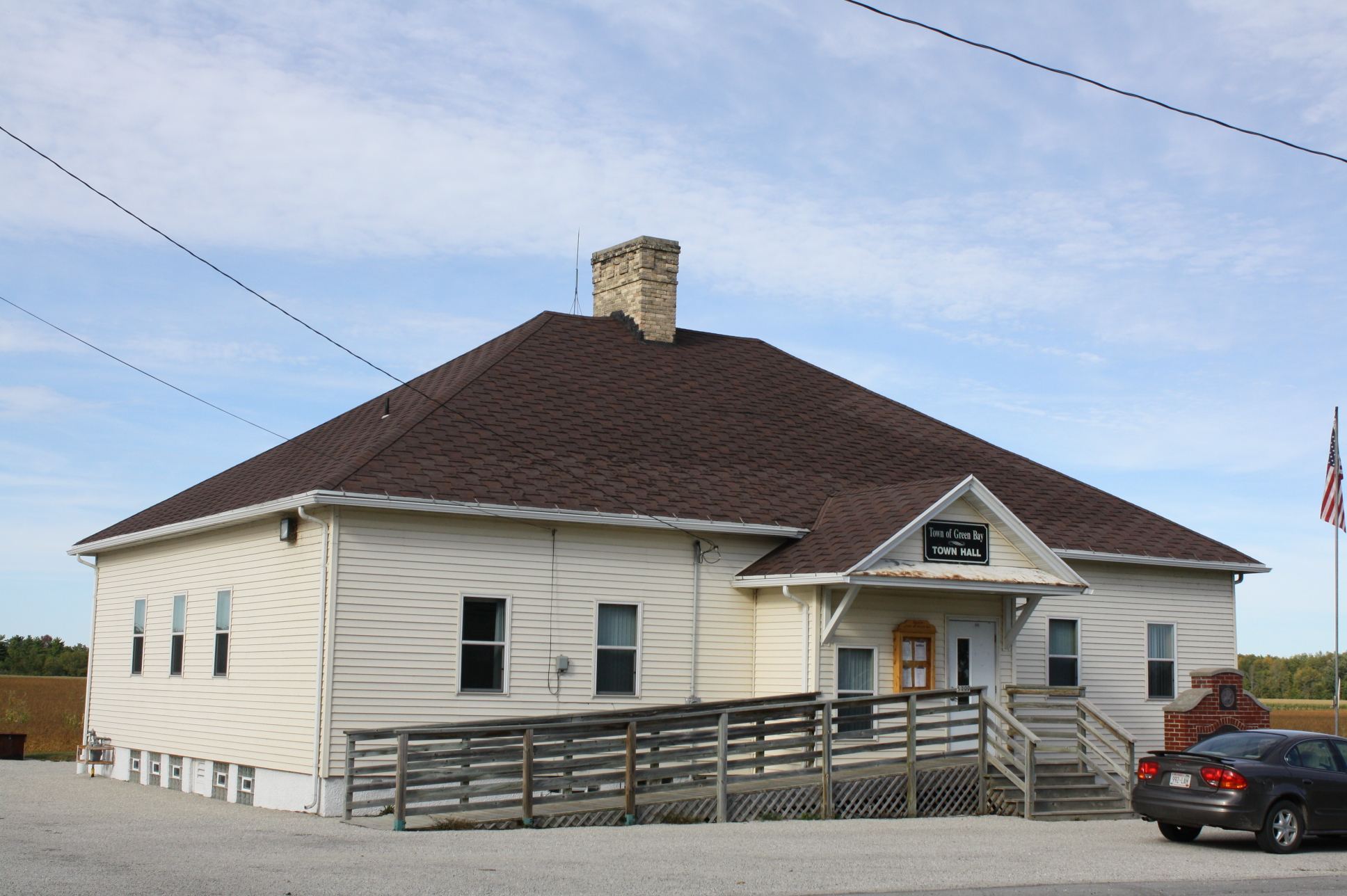
Town hall for the town of Green Bay in Champion

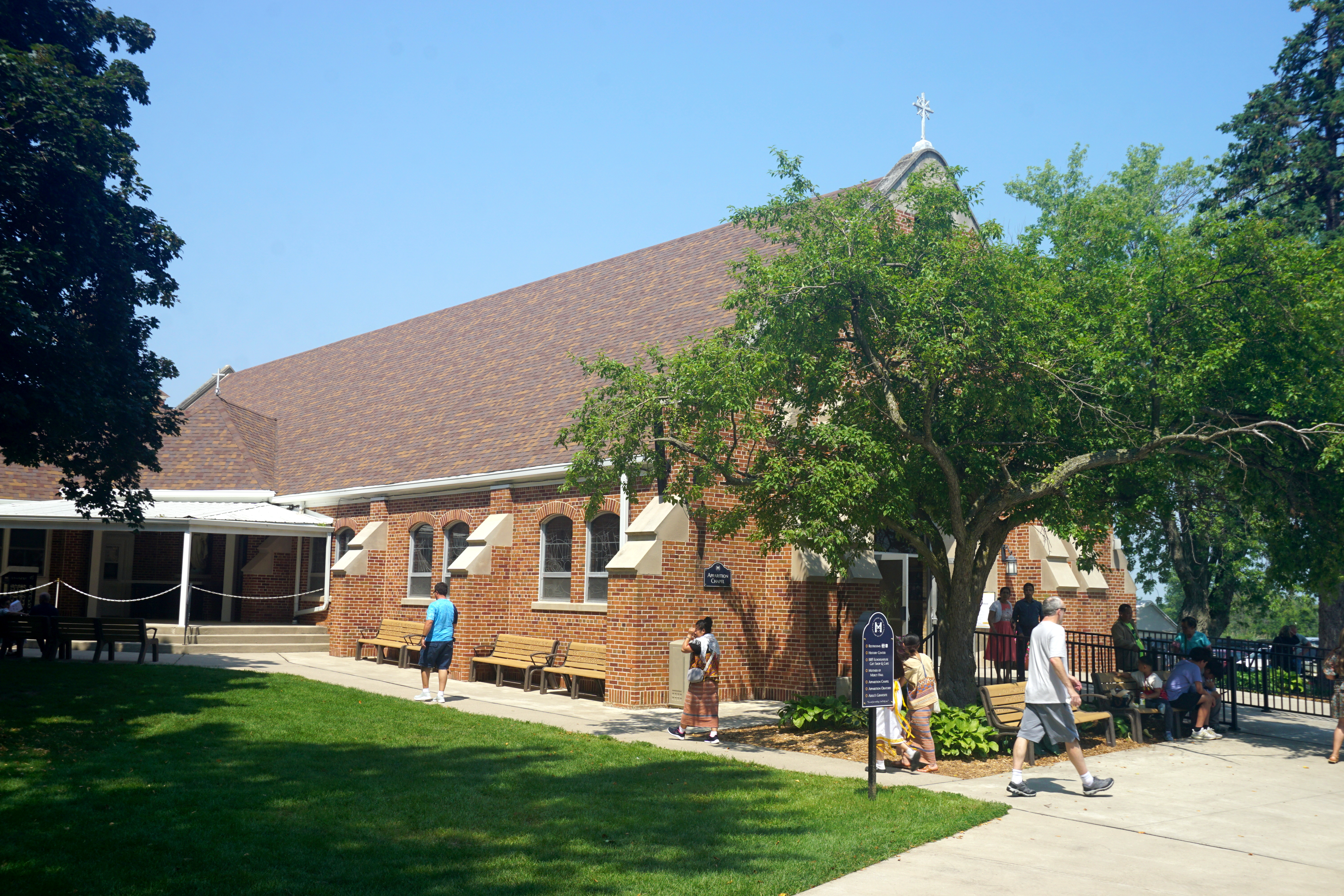
National Shrine of Our Lady of Champion near Champion

== Notable people ==
- Grégoire Dupont, legislator
- Peter Pernin, Catholic pastor (1868-9) and Peshtigo fire memoirist
- Adele Brice, Belgian-born American Marian visionary
