= Green Bay (town), Wisconsin =

Human settlement in Wisconsin, United States of America

Green Bay, Wisconsin
- Town
- Town of Green Bay
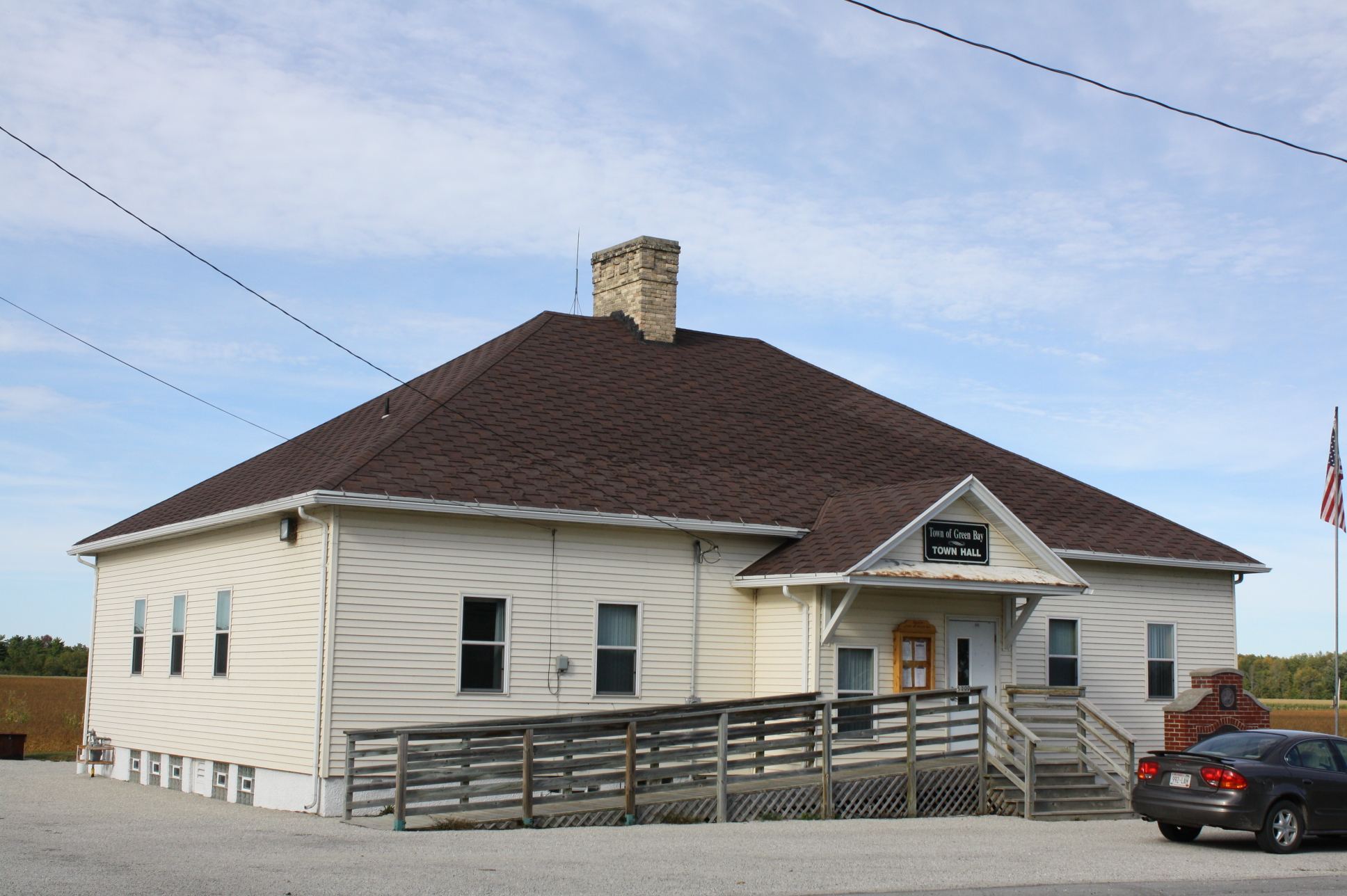
- Town Hall

- Location of the town in Brown County, Wisconsin
- Coordinates: 44°35′21″N 87°47′39″W
- Country: United States
- State: Wisconsin
- County: Brown

Area
  - Total: 30.87 sq mi (80.0 km^{2})
  - Land: 22.11 sq mi (57.3 km^{2})
  - Water: 8.76 sq mi (22.7 km^{2})

Population (2020)
  - Total: 2,197
  - Density: 99.37/sq mi (38.37/km^{2})
- Time zone: UTC-6 (Central (CST))
  - Summer (DST): UTC-5 (CDT)
- Area code(s): 920 & 274
- GNIS feature ID: 1583310

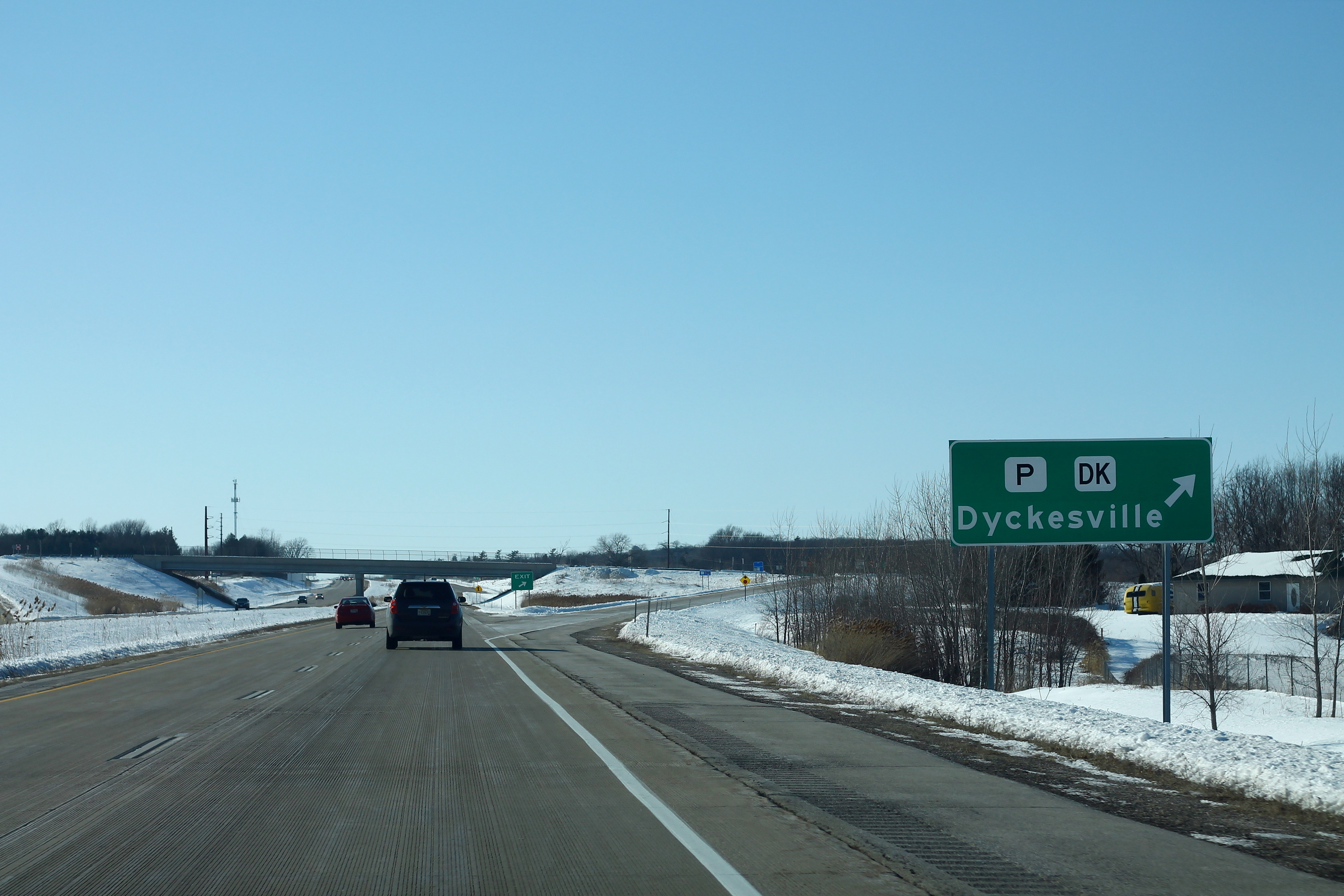
Dyckesville exit and County P overpass on Wisconsin Highway 57 as it passes through the town

Green Bay (/ɡrin ˈbeɪ/ green BAY) is a town in Brown County in the U.S. state of Wisconsin. The population was 2,197 at the 2020 census. The town is located several miles northeast of the city of Green Bay. The unincorporated community of Champion is located in the town, and the unincorporated communities of Dyckesville and New Franken are located partially in the town.

== Geography ==
The town is located on the southern shore of Green Bay, an arm of Lake Michigan. The town is 15 miles (24 km) northeast of the city of Green Bay. The eastern border of the town is the Kewaunee County line.

According to the United States Census Bureau, the town has a total area of 30.8 square miles (79.9 km^{2}), of which 22.1 square miles (57.3 km^{2}) is land and 8.8 square miles (22.7 km^{2}), or 28.38%, is water.

== Demographics ==
As of the census of 2000, there were 1,772 people, 600 households, and 493 families residing in the town. The population density was 80.1 people per square mile (30.9/km^{2}). There were 685 housing units at an average density of 31.0 per square mile (12.0/km^{2}). The racial makeup of the town was 98.36% White, 0.06% Black or African American, 0.23% Native American, 0.62% Asian, 0.11% from other races, and 0.62% from two or more races. Hispanic or Latino of any race were 0.06% of the population.

There were 600 households, out of which 37.8% had children under the age of 18 living with them, 76.3% were married couples living together, 3.3% had a female householder with no husband present, and 17.8% were non-families. 13.8% of all households were made up of individuals, and 4.2% had someone living alone who was 65 years of age or older. The average household size was 2.87 and the average family size was 3.15.

In the town, the population was spread out, with 27.0% under the age of 18, 6.8% from 18 to 24, 31.3% from 25 to 44, 24.9% from 45 to 64, and 10.0% who were 65 years of age or older. The median age was 37 years. For every 100 females, there were 107.5 males. For every 100 females age 18 and over, there were 108.2 males.

The median income for a household in the town was $60,172, and the median income for a family was $63,958. Males had a median income of $38,300 versus $25,156 for females. The per capita income for the town was $22,928. About 1.4% of families and 3.1% of the population were below the poverty line, including 1.4% of those under age 18 and 9.2% of those age 65 or over.

=== Most Belgian-American towns ===
The town of Green Bay is the fifth-most Belgian-American community in the United States, by proportion of residents. It contains the unincorporated community of Champion, the first settlement of Belgians in the area. Originally known as "Aux Premiers Belges," it was later named "Robinsonville", and then "Champion."

1. Union, Door County, Wisconsin: 49%
2. Red River, Wisconsin (Kewaunee County): 47%
3. Brussels, Wisconsin (Door County): 36.4% (composed of "Brussels community" and "Namur Community")
4. Lincoln, Kewaunee County, Wisconsin: 35.4%
5. Green Bay (town), Wisconsin: 31.8%

== Religion ==
The National Shrine of Our Lady of Good Help is in the town of Green Bay, in the unincorporated community of Champion.

== Recreation ==
Bay Shore County Park is between Highway 57 and the shore of Green Bay. Different fossil animals and fossil burrows are preserved in the rocks above the boat ramp at the park, and the different layers of fossils have been diagrammed in detail.

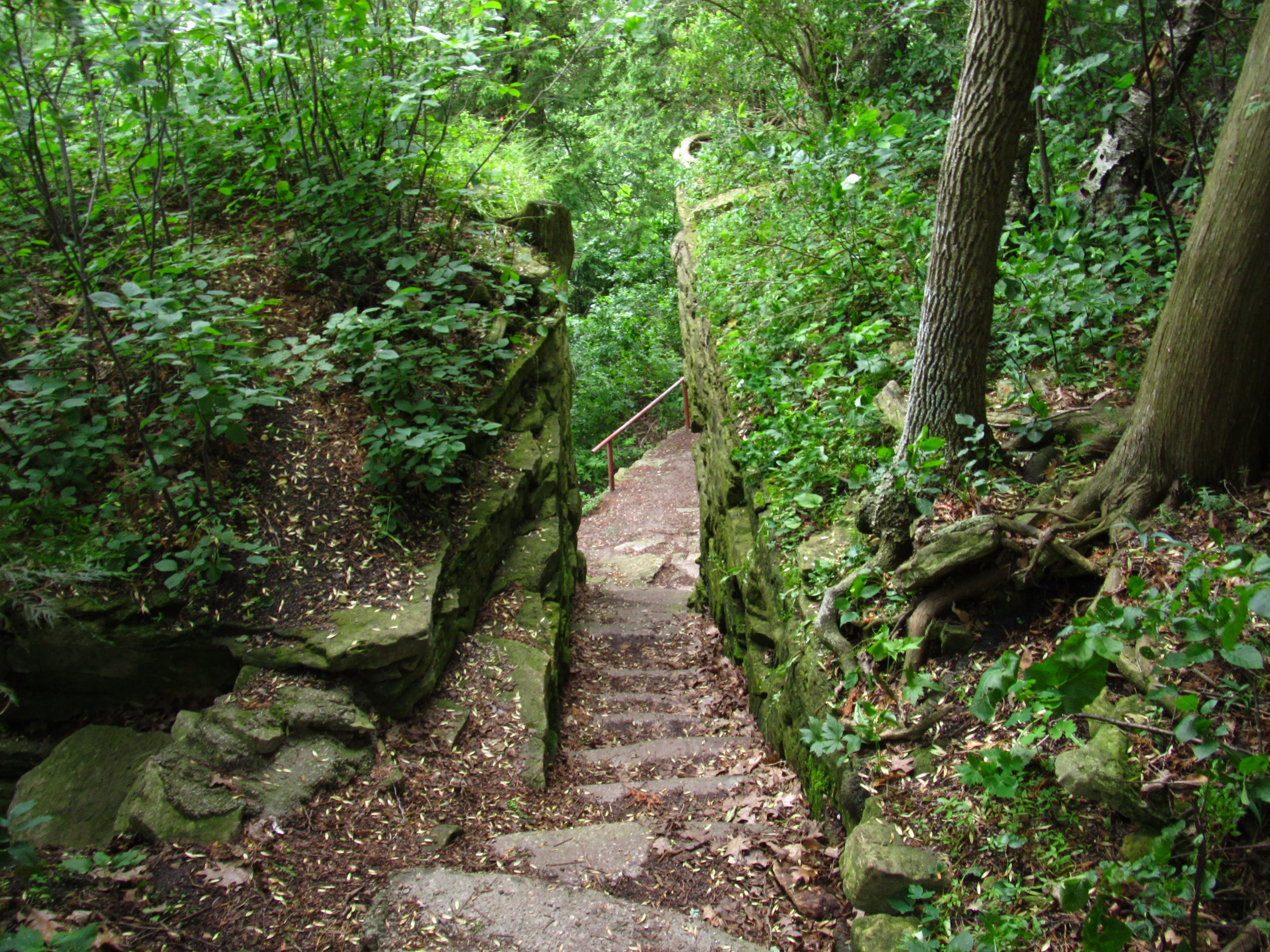
Stairs through the escarpment

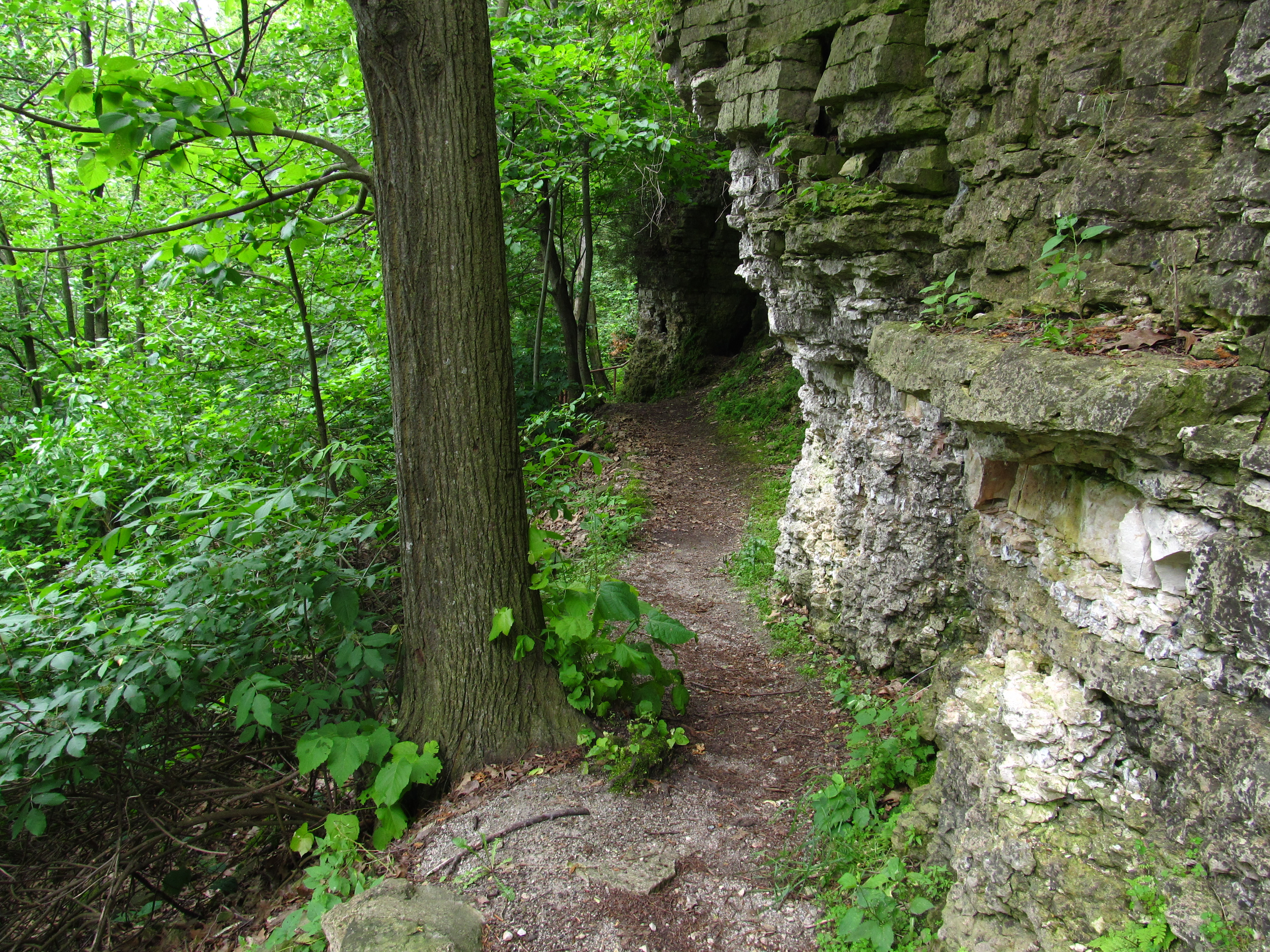
Trail adjacent to the escarpment

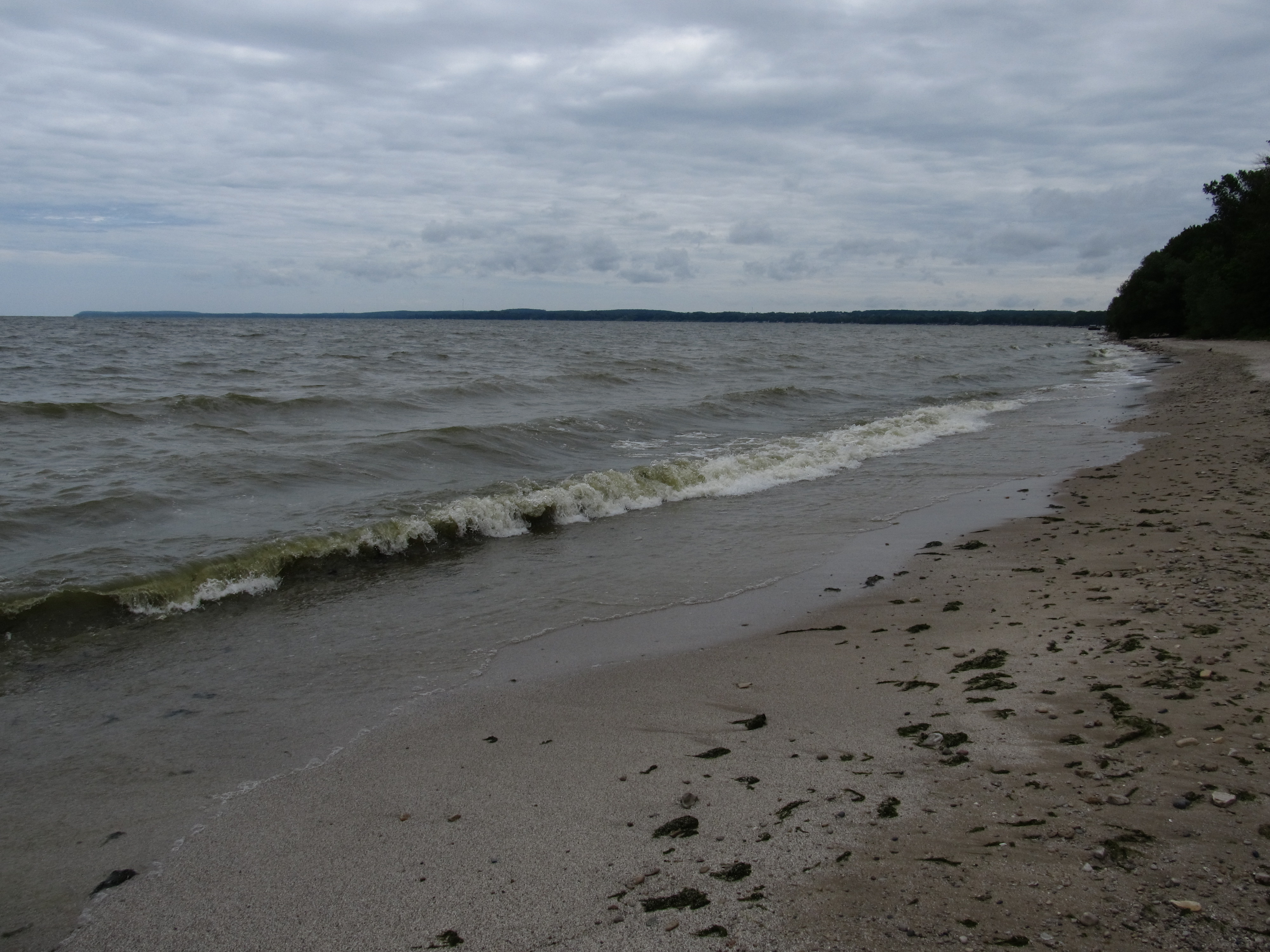
Beach on the shore of Green Bay

== Notable people ==
- Benjamin Fontaine, legislator
