= Flacey-en-Bresse =

- Commune
- The church and surroundings in Flacey-en-Bresse
- Location of Flacey-en-Bresse
- Location within France Location within Bourgogne-Franche-Comté
- Coordinates: 46°35′56″N 5°23′31″E
- Country: France
- Region: Bourgogne-Franche-Comté
- Department: Saône-et-Loire
- Arrondissement: Louhans
- Canton: Cuiseaux
- Area^{1}: 13.72 km^{2} (5.30 sq mi)
- Elevation: 208 m (682 ft)
- Highest elevation: 220 m (720 ft)
- Lowest elevation: 188 m (617 ft)
- Population (2023): 412
  - Density: 30.0/km^{2} (77.8/sq mi)
- Time zone: UTC+01:00 (CET)
  - Summer (DST): UTC+02:00 (CEST)
- INSEE/Postal code: 71198 /71580
- ^{1} French Land Register data, which excludes lakes, ponds, glaciers > 1 km^{2} (0.386 sq mi or 247 acres) and river estuaries.

Flacey-en-Bresse (French pronunciation: [flasɛ ɑ̃ bʁɛs], literally Flacey in Bresse) is a commune in the Saône-et-Loire department in the region of Bourgogne-Franche-Comté in eastern France.

== Geography ==
The Vallière forms part of the commune's north-western border.

== Notable people from Flacey-en-Bresse ==
- Peter Pernin Missionary, survivor and memoirist of the Peshtigo fire

== See also ==
- Communes of the Saône-et-Loire department
