= National Shrine of Our Lady of Champion =

- The chapel at the National Shrine of Our Lady of Champion.
- National Shrine of Our Lady of Champion
- 44°35′26.3″N 87°46′24.8″W
- Location: Champion, Wisconsin
- Country: United States
- Denomination: Catholic
- Website: championshrine.org/

History
- Status: National shrine
- Founded: 1861

Administration
- Diocese: Diocese of Green Bay

Our Lady of Champion
- Location: Champion, Wisconsin, United States
- Date: October 1859
- Witness: Servant of God Adele Brice
- Type: Marian apparition
- Approval: December 8, 2010; Bishop David L. Ricken; Diocese of Green Bay

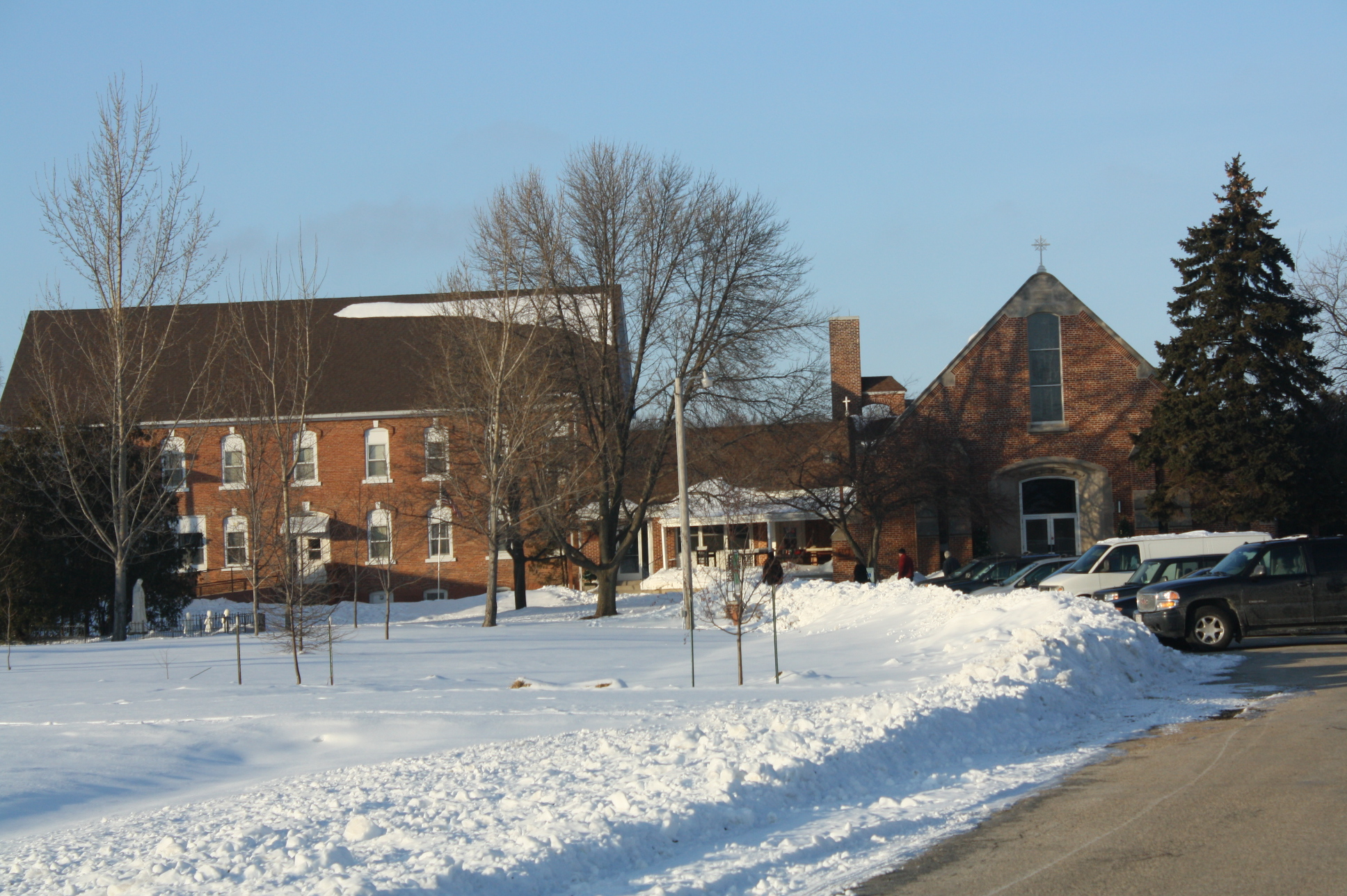
Shrine and school in 2010

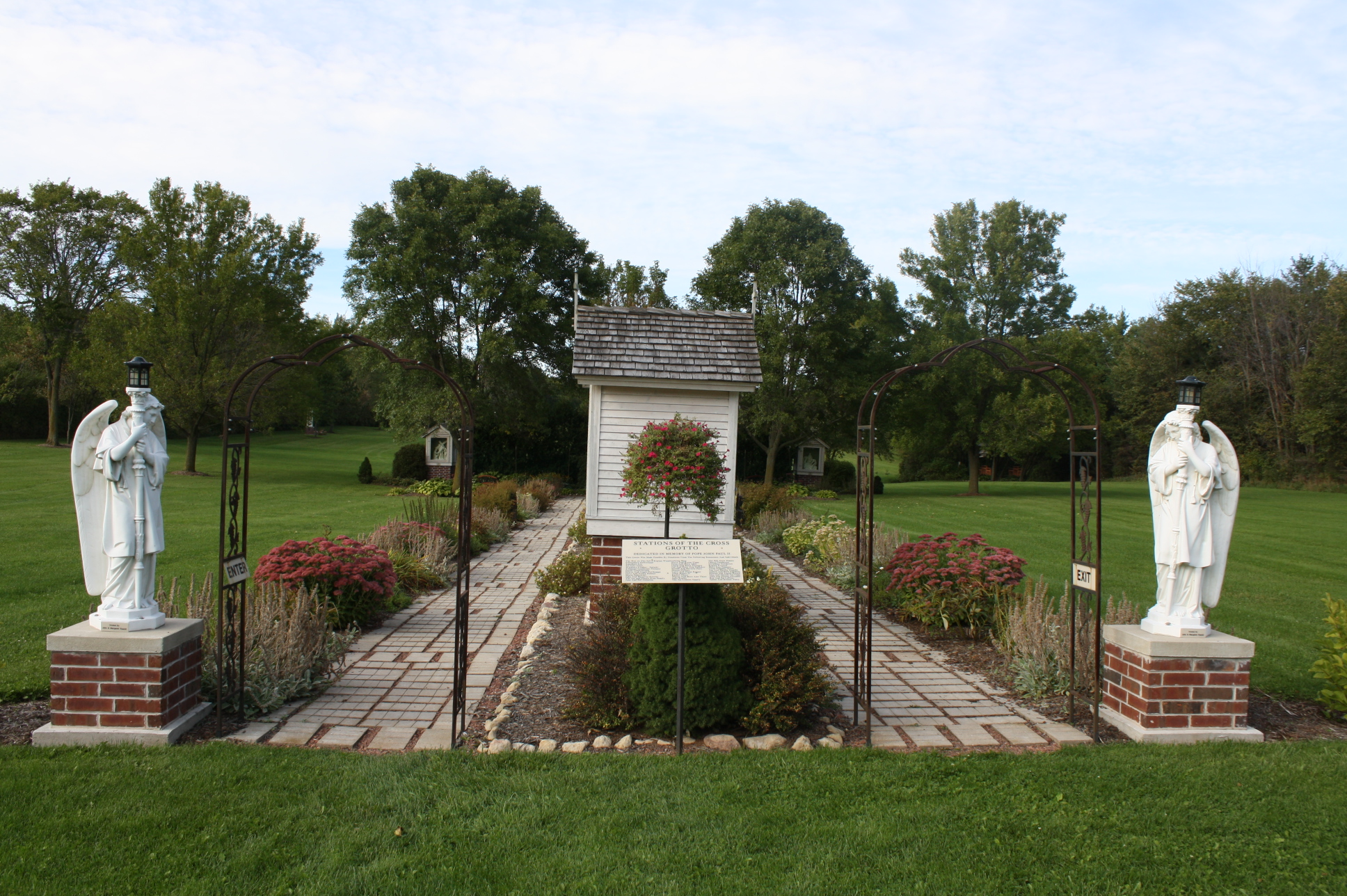
Stations of the Cross at the Shrine

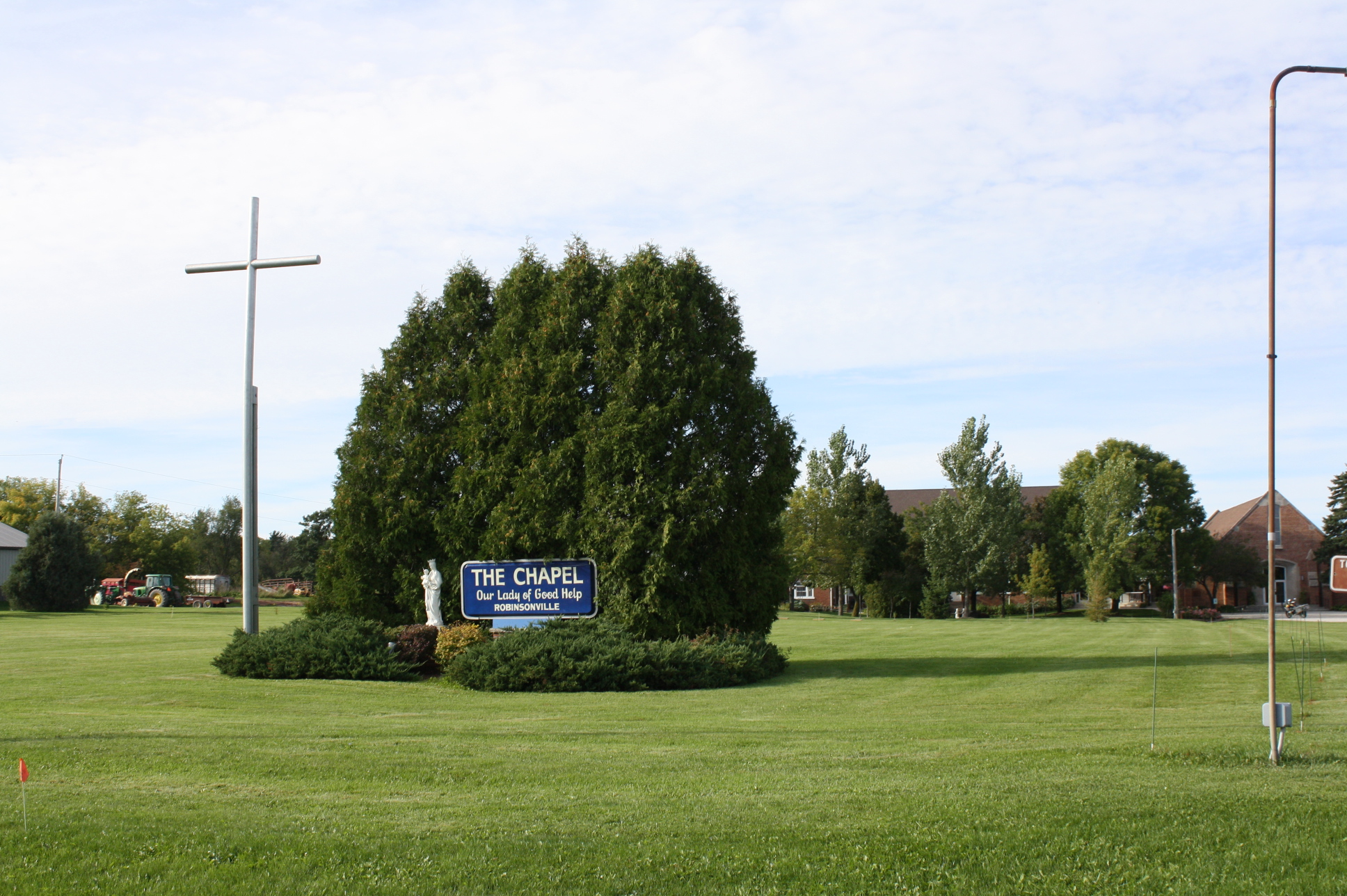
Entrance sign

The National Shrine of Our Lady of Champion, is a Catholic shrine to Mary, mother of God located within the Diocese of Green Bay in the United States. The chapel is in the Champion section of the town of Green Bay, about 16 miles (26 km) northeast of downtown Green Bay proper. It stands on the site of the reported apparition of Mary to a Belgian-born woman, Adele Brice, in 1859.

The apparition was formally approved on December 8, 2010, by Bishop David L. Ricken, becoming the first Marian apparition approved by the Catholic Church in the United States. Bishop Ricken also approved the chapel as a diocesan shrine, recognizing its long history as a place of pilgrimage and prayer. On August 15, 2016, the U.S. Conference of Catholic Bishops designated the shrine as a national shrine. In recognition of this, the shrine's name was changed to The National Shrine of Our Lady of Good Help.

On April 20, 2023, the name of the shrine was changed to The National Shrine of Our Lady of Champion.

== Apparitions of 1859 ==
Adele Brice was born in Belgium in 1831. Together with her parents, she immigrated to Wisconsin in 1855. In early October 1859, Adele reported seeing a woman clothed in dazzling white, a yellow sash around her waist, and a crown of stars on her flowing blonde locks. The lady was surrounded by a bright light, and stood between two trees, a hemlock and a maple. Brice was frightened by the vision and prayed until it disappeared. When she told her parents what she had seen, they suggested that a poor soul might be in need of prayers.

October 9, 1859, Brice saw the apparition a second time while walking to Mass in the community of Bay Settlement. Her sister and another woman, Marie Theresa VanderMissen (1822–1898), were with her at the time, but neither saw anything. She asked the parish priest for advice and he told her if she saw the apparition again, she should ask it, "In the Name of God, who are you and what do you wish of me?"

Returning from the Mass, she saw the apparition a third time, and this time posed the question the priest had told her to ask. The apparition replied, "I am the Queen of Heaven, who prays for the conversion of sinners, and I wish you to do the same." Brice was also given a mission to "gather the children in this wild country and teach them what they should know for salvation."

Brice, who was aged 28 at the time of the apparitions, devoted the rest of her life to teaching children. She initially traveled on foot from house to house, but later opened a small school. Other women joined her in her work and formed a community of sisters according to the rule of the Third Order Franciscans, although Brice never took public vows as a nun. Brice died on July 5, 1896.

== Chapel ==
=== Early history ===
The original chapel was a 10x12 foot wooden structure built by Lambert Brice, Adele's father, at the site of the Marian apparition. Isabella Doyen donated the 5 acres (20,000 m^{2}) around the spot, and a larger (24x40 foot) wooden church was built in 1861. This chapel bore the inscription "Notre Dame de bon Secours, priez pour nous" (“Our Lady of Good Help, pray for us”), giving the shrine its original name. The site became a popular pilgrimage site, and the chapel was soon too small to accommodate the growing number of devotees. A larger brick chapel was built in 1880 and dedicated by Francis Xavier Krautbauer, the second Bishop of Green Bay. A school and convent were also built on the site in the 1880s.

=== Peshtigo Fire ===
Lumber companies and sawmills had been harvesting the woods of northeastern Wisconsin for decades, leaving immense piles of sawdust and branches as they produced lumber and other wood products. The night of October 8, 1871, a firestorm began near Peshtigo, Wisconsin, that spread through the woods and towns, consuming everything in its path. Unable to outrun the flames, nearly 2,000 people in the area died in the inferno. Some people assume that, driven by strong winds, the conflagration leaped across Green Bay of Lake Michigan and began burning huge sections of the Door Peninsula. When the firestorm – whatever its origin – threatened the chapel, visionary Adele Brice refused to leave and instead organized a procession to petition the Virgin Mary for her protection. The surrounding land was destroyed by the fire, but the chapel and its grounds, together with all who had taken refuge there, remained unharmed. The conflagration engulfed about 1,200,000 acres (4,900 km^{2}) and is the deadliest wildfire in recorded history.

=== Present day ===
The current shrine was constructed with support from Bishop Paul Peter Rhode, who dedicated the new building in July 1942. It is a Tudor Gothic-style building and accommodates approximately 300 people in an upper Apparition Chapel, along with a small Apparition Oratory for prayer on the lower level. The Apparition Oratory also contains a collection of crutches left behind in thanksgiving as ex-votos by those who came to pray at the shrine. The shrine grounds have an outdoor area for a rosary walk and Stations of the Cross.

The largest annual gatherings at the chapel are on the feast of the Assumption of the Blessed Virgin Mary, August 15, where Mass is celebrated with an outdoors and a procession is held around the shrine precincts, and the Walk to Mary pilgrimage, which takes place on the first Saturday of May, where pilgrims walk 7, 14, or 22 miles to the Shrine from other locations. Both events attract thousands of people.

The Shrine of Our Lady of Champion gained national recognition when the apparitions were approved after a two-year investigation by Bishop David Ricken on December 8, 2010. This makes it the first and only apparition approved by the Catholic Church in the United States. Bishop Ricken noted his predecessors had implicitly endorsed the shrine in holding services there over the years.

On August 15, 2016, the United States Conference of Catholic Bishops designated the church as a national shrine. To reflect this, the shrine's name was changed to The National Shrine of Our Lady of Good Help.

On April 20, 2023, the shrine was again renamed to The National Shrine of Our Lady of Champion.

On January 30, 2026, Bishop David L. Ricken officially opened the cause for the canonization of Adele Brice and named her a Servant of God.

== See also ==
- Shrines to the Virgin Mary
- List of shrines
