= James Duggan =

Irish-American prelate

The Right Reverend James Duggan
- Bishop-Emeritus of Chicago
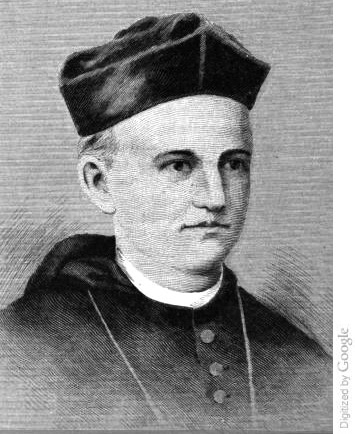
- Church: Catholic
- Archdiocese: Chicago
- Appointed: 9 January 1857
- Predecessor: Anthony O'Regan
- Successor: Patrick Feehan
- Previous posts: Coadjutor Archbishop of Saint Louis (1857-1859); Titular Bishop of Galaba (1857-1859)

Orders
- Ordination: 29 May 1847 by Peter Kenrick
- Consecration: 3 May 1857 by Peter Kenrick

Personal details
- Born: May 22, 1825 Maynooth, County Kildare, Ireland
- Died: March 27, 1899 (aged 73) Saint Louis, Missouri, U.S.

James Duggan (May 22, 1825 – March 27, 1899) was an Irish-born American Catholic prelate who served as Bishop of Chicago from 1859 until his resignation in 1880. However, from 1869 to 1880, he was held in a sanatorium in Missouri due to insanity.

Duggan previously served as coadjutor Archbishop of St. Louis from 1857 to 1859.

== Biography ==
=== Early years ===
James Duggan was born on May 22, 1825, in Maynooth, County Kildare, Ireland, a clothier's son. At the invitation of Bishop Peter Kenrick, recruiting young men to fill the need for priests in Missouri, he emigrated to the United States in 1842, to complete studies for the priesthood at St. Vincent's Seminary in Cape Girardeau, Missouri.

=== Priesthood ===
Duggan was ordained a priest for the Diocese of St. Louis by Kenrick in St. Louis on May 29, 1847.

In November 1853, Bishop James Van Velde left the Diocese of Chicago after Pope Pius IX appointed him as bishop of the Diocese of Natchez in Mississippi. Duggan was named as the temporary administrator of the diocese, serving until the installation of Anthony O'Regan in late 1854 as the new bishop. After Duggan returned to St. Louis, Kenrick appointed him as vicar general.

=== Coadjutor archbishop of St. Louis ===
Duggan was appointed as coadjutor archbishop of St. Louis and titular bishop of Gabala by Pope Pius IX on January 9, 1857, to assist Kenrick. On May 3, 1857, Kenrick consecrated Duggan at the Cathedral of St. Louis in St. Louis.

While coadjutor archbishop, Duggan also served as administrator of Chicago for a second time when Pius IX accepted O'Regan's resignation in June 1858 for health reasons. When Duggan became administrator, the city was still recovering financially from the Panic of 1857. In addition, there was a great deal of animosity among parishioners toward past bishops. The French-Canadian Catholic community believed that Bishop Anthony O'Regan had stolen their parish property. The German immigrants, the largest Catholic community in the diocese, resented that the pope had chosen O'Regan, an Irish cleric, as their bishop.

=== Bishop of Chicago ===
On January 21, 1859, Pius IX appointed Duggan as bishop of Chicago. That same year, Duggan founded the House of the Good Shepherd in Chicago for what were termed "delinquent women." Its operation was given to the religious sisters of the Sisters of the Holy Cross.

During his times in Illinois, Dugan had become close friends with US Senator Stephen A Douglas. Douglas had engaged with Abraham Lincoln in a famous series of debates about slavery in 1858. On June 2, 1861, Duggan visited Douglas on his deathbed in Chicago. Douglas would die the next day.

In 1863, Duggan laid the foundation for a new building at the University of St. Mary of the Lake. The diocese also established new schools of medicine and law there. However, as financial pressures increased and enrollment dropped, a rift developed between Duggan and the university administration. St. Mary of the Lake closed in 1866 due to its financial problems.

Duggan in 1864 denounced the Fenian Brotherhood as being illegal and condemned by the Catholic Church. The Brotherhood was a secret society of Irish immigrants that started during the American Civil War. Its ultimate aim was fomenting an armed rebellion in Ireland against British rule. Duggan warned that any Catholics participating in the Brotherhood would be denied the sacraments. This denunciation prompted animosity against Duggan among many Irish congregants and clergy in the diocese.

St. Mary of the Lake University closed in 1866 due to its financial problems. In October 1866, Duggan traveled to Baltimore to attend the Second Plenary Council of Baltimore. Duggan had held a reputation in Chicago for intelligence, affability, and eloquence. However, after returning from Baltimore, he started exhibiting mood swings, erratic behavior and signs of psychological stress. His colleagues in the diocese became concerned for his mental health. At some point during the ensuing two years, Duggen took a trip to Europe to recuperate. While he was away, several clergy in the diocese wrote to the Vatican, asking them to examine Duggen's competency.

After arriving back in Chicago, Duggan in 1868 closed the seminary on the Saint Mary of the Lake campus and converted it into an orphanage. He also dismissed four priests that had been his close advisors, alarming others in the Chicago hierarchy. Duggan invited the Sisters of Charity to open St. Joseph's Hospital in Chicago that same year; he provided them with furniture and beds from the closed seminary.

=== Institutionalization and death ===
On April 14, 1869, Pius IX ruled that Duggan was no longer mentally capable of performing his duties and sent him to a sanatorium operated by the Sisters of Charity in St. Louis. The pope felt it unjust to simply remove Duggan as bishop since he had broken no canon laws. Therefore, he would officially remain bishop of Chicago.

Pius IX named Reverend Thomas Foley from the Archdiocese of Baltimore as coadjutor bishop to administer the diocese, filling that role until his death in 1879. In September 1880, Duggan was sufficiently rational to sign a letter of resignation as bishop of Chicago, allowing the pope to appoint a new one.

Duggan died at the sanatorium in St. Louis on March 27, 1899. He was buried in Calvary Cemetery in Evanston, Illinois.

== Legacy ==
On March 29, 2001, the archdiocese moved Duggan's remains to the Bishop's Mausoleum at Mount Carmel Cemetery in Hillside, Illinois. At the reinterment ceremony, Cardinal Francis George spoke about rectifying the injustice that had been done to Duggan and the stigma of mental illness.
