= Rule of life =

Ruleset describing a lifeway

Monks and other religious institutes generally follow a rule of life, i.e., one of the great religious rules as guidance to their life and growth in their religious journey. These are: the Rule of St. Basil, the Rule of Saint Benedict, the Rule of Saint Augustine, and the Rule of Saint Francis. Additionally many institutes follow the Rule of Saint Albert of the Carmelites or the one followed by the Order of Preachers.

The Rule of St. Basil, credited to the 4th century bishop Basil of Caesarea and one of the earliest rules for Christian monastic life, is followed primarily by monastic communities of the Eastern Christian tradition. Most Western monastics (Benedictines, Cistercians, Trappists, Carthusians etc.) observe the Rule of Saint Benedict, a collection of precepts for what is called contemplative religious life written by Benedict of Nursia. The Rule of Saint Augustine stresses self-denial, moderation, and care for those in need.

Jesuits follow what is called not a rule, but the constitutions composed by their founder, Ignatius of Loyola, which laid aside traditional practices such as chanting the Liturgy of the hours in favour of greater adaptability and mobility under a more authoritarian regime. Other institutes combine a rule with constitutions that give more precise indications for the life of the members. Thus the Capuchin constitutions of 1536 are added to the Rule of Saint Francis.

In addition to the more fundamental provisions of the rule or constitutions, religious institutes have statutes that are more easily subject to change.

== See also ==
- Book of Discipline, a book detailing the beliefs, standards, doctrines, canon law, and polity of a particular Christian denomination.
- Code of conduct, a set of rules outlining the norms, rules, and responsibilities or proper practices of an individual party or an organization.
- Lifeway
- Ordnung, the set of rules for church members in the Anabaptist tradition
- Social norm, a shared standard of acceptable behavior by a group
