= Anthony O'Regan =

Irish prelate

The Right Reverend Anthony O'Regan
- Bishop-Emeritus of Chicago; Titular Bishop of Dora
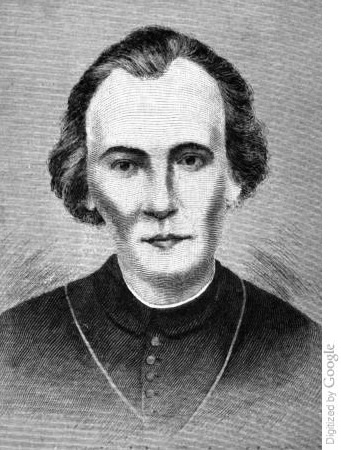
- Church: Catholic
- Archdiocese: Chicago
- Appointed: 9 December 1853
- Predecessor: James Oliver Van de Velde, S.J.
- Successor: James Duggan
- Previous post: Apostolic Administrator of Quincy (1853-1857)

Orders
- Ordination: 29 November 1834 by John MacHale
- Consecration: 25 July 1854 by Peter Kenrick

Personal details
- Born: 27 July 1809 Lavalleyroe, County Mayo, Ireland
- Died: 13 November 1866 (aged 57) London, England
- Education: Maynooth College

Anthony O'Regan (27 July 1809 – 13 November 1866) was an Irish Catholic prelate who served as Bishop of Chicago from 1854 to 1858.

== Biography ==
=== Early life ===
Anthony O'Regan was born in Lavalleyroe, County Mayo, and studied at Maynooth College in Maynooth, Ireland.

O'Regan was ordained to the priesthood on 29 November 1834 for the Archdiocese of Tuam in Tuam, Ireland, by Archbishop John MacHale. Following his ordination, MacHale appointed O'Regan as professor of scripture, Hebrew language and dogmatic theology at St. Jarlath's College in Tuam. He was named president of the college in 1844.

In 1849, Archbishop Peter Kenrick of the Archdiocese of St. Louis recruited O'Regan to head the newly established theological seminary in Cardondelet, then a village near St. Louis, Missouri.

=== Bishop of Chicago ===
On 9 December 1853, O'Regan was appointed the third bishop of Chicago by Pope Pius IX. Feeling that he lacked the pastoral experience to run a diocese, O'Regan refused the appointment. However, when Pius IX told him to accept it, O'Regan acquiesced. He received his episcopal consecration on 25 July 1854, from Kenrick, with Bishops James Oliver Van de Velde and John Henni serving as co-consecrators, at the Cathedral of St. Louis. While still in St. Louis, O'Regan suffered a nervous illness.

After recovering from his illness, O'Regan arrived in Chicago; he was installed as bishop on 3 September 1853. He soon began construction on a new episcopal residence, completed in 1856. O'Regan purchased property for several churches and Calvary Cemetery.

An able administrator and strong disciplinarian, O'Regan alienated many clergy with his management style. The French-Canadian community also came into conflict with him, stating that he stole a plot of land from a parish that was planning to build a church. They also accused him of stealing priestly vestments from a parish. In return, O'Regan castigated the French-Canadian community several times in the Chicago press. A crash in the Chicago real estate market in 1857 was another stressor for O'Regan.

Unable to cope with the diocese and in declining health, O'Regan traveled to Rome in 1857 to submit his resignation as bishop of Chicago; Pius IX accepted on 25 June 1858, and named him titular bishop of Dora.

=== Death and legacy ===
O'Regan retired to London, England, where he befriended Cardinals Nicholas Wiseman and Henry Edward Manning. O'Regan died from liver disease on 13 November 1866 at age 57. His funeral mass was celebrated by Archbishop MacHale at Tuam Cathedral, and his remains were buried in Cloonfad, Ireland.
