= List of urban fires =

Major urban fires affecting more than one building

This is a list of major urban conflagrations. Before the 20th century, fires were a major hazard to urban areas and the cause of massive amounts of damage to cities.

For notable fires that involved a single structure, see list of building or structure fires. Other lists record wildfires (including forest fires) and transportation fires, though those that caused significant urban damage also appear on that list.

== Antiquity to Middle Ages ==
- 587 BC – The destruction of the Temple and city of Jerusalem.
- 330 BC – Persepolis destroyed by fire after its capture by Alexander the Great.
- 146 BC – Carthage was systematically burnt down over 17 days by the Romans at the end of the Third Punic War.
- 64 – Great Fire of Rome, Italy.
- 79 – Lyon burned to ashes.
- 406 – A great fire burns down much of Constantinople.
- 532 – The Nika riots result in the destruction of much of Constantinople by fire.
- 798 – London nearly destroyed.
- 847 – Borgo, the area around Saint Peter's Basilica in Rome, was devastated by fire.
- 1041 – Fire destroys most of the old city of Bremen, Germany, including the cathedral.
- 1046 – A fire in Hildesheim, Germany, destroys parts of the city, including the cathedral.
- 1132 – In June, a huge fire in Hangzhou, China, destroyed 13,000 houses.
- 1135 – Great Medieval London Fire of 1135. The first of the two Great Medieval Fires of London. This blaze was so severe that it destroyed most of the city between St. Paul's and St. Clement Danes in Westminster.
- 1137 – A Great Fire in Hangzhou, China, destroyed 10,000 houses.
- 1157 – First Fire of Lübeck, Germany, destroys the city.
- 1204 – Sack of Constantinople (1204). Constantinople was burned three times during the Fourth Crusade.
- 1212 – The Great Fire of Southwark London 1212. The second of the two Great Medieval Fires of London. As many as 3,000 people died on the London Bridge while trying to flee the city.
- 1251 – Second Fire of Lübeck, Germany, triggers the use of stone as a fire-safe building material.
- 1253 – Great Fire of Utrecht, the Netherlands, lasted for nine days and destroyed much of the city.
- 1276 – Third Fire of Lübeck, Germany, results in a comprehensive fire safety system. This was the last major fire in the city before bombing of WW II.
- 1327 – Fire of Munich, Germany, destroys one-third of the city, 30 deaths.
- 1405 – Fire of Bern, Switzerland, destroys 600 houses, over 100 deaths.
- 1421 – First Great Fire of Amsterdam, the Netherlands.
- 1426 – Hanyang fires (now Seoul) in Joseon.
- 1438 – Great Fire of Gouda, the Netherlands, almost destroys the entire city.
- 1452 – Second Great Fire of Amsterdam, the Netherlands, destroys three-quarters of the city.

== 16th century ==
- 1540 - 1540 European drought was a climatic event that caused many city fires.
- 1544 – Burning of Edinburgh - An English amphibious raid destroyed portions of the city and many surrounding villages.
- 1547 – The 1547 Moscow fire sparked a rebellion.
- 1571 – The 1571 Moscow fire occurred when the forces of the Crimean Khan Devlet I Giray raided the city.

== 17th century ==
- 1608 – First settlement in Jamestown, Virginia burnt.
- 1615 – Great Fire of Wymondham, Norfolk, England, two simultaneous fires destroyed 300 properties.
- 1624 – Oslo, Norway, destroyed by fire.
- 1625 – First Great Stockholm Fire, Sweden, burned for three days and destroyed a fifth of the infrastructure.
- 1633 – Great Istanbul Fire of 1633, Ottoman Empire, modern Turkey, started in the Cibali Gate Port due to a reckless caulker and burned for three days from early Friday morning to Sunday. About 20,000 buildings and all the ships docked on the Cibali Gate Port were demolished.
- 1652 – Glasgow, Scotland, a third of the city was destroyed and over 1,000 families left homeless.
- 1653 – Great Fire of Marlborough, England, destroyed the Guildhall, St. Mary's Church, the County Armoury, and 224 dwellings.
- 1656 – Fire of Aachen destroyed 4,664 houses, kills 17.
- 1657 – Great Fire of Meireki destroyed two-thirds of the Japanese capital Edo (modern-day Tokyo).
- 1660 – Fire in Istanbul, Turkey, destroyed two-thirds of the city and killed an estimated 40,000 people.
- 1663 – Great Fire of Nagasaki destroyed the port of Nagasaki in Japan.

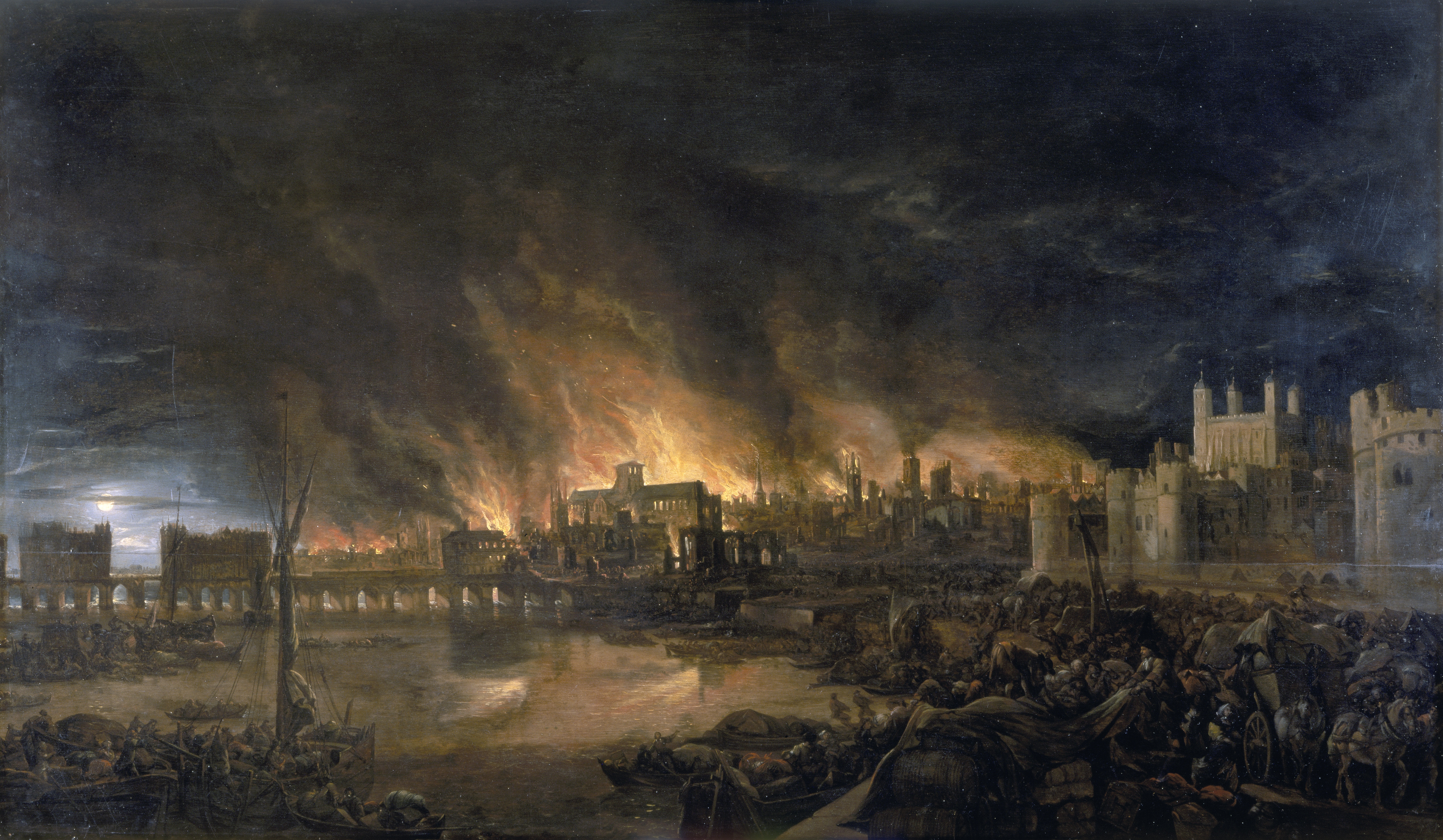
Great Fire of London, 1666

- 1666 – Great Fire of London of 1666, which originated in a baker's shop on Pudding Lane and destroyed much of London.
- 1675 – Great Fire of Northampton, England. The blaze was caused by sparks from an open fire in St. Mary's Street near Northampton castle. In six hours it devastated the town centre, destroying about 600 buildings (three-quarters of the town) including All Saints church. 11 people died and about 700 families were made homeless.
- 1676 – Jamestown, Virginia was burned by Nathaniel Bacon and his followers during Bacon's Rebellion to prevent Governor Berkley from using it as a base.
- 1677 – Fire of Rostock, Germany, destroyed 700 houses and accelerated the city's economic decline at the end of the Hanseatic period.
- 1678 – Hardegsen. Germany, experienced a fire during the Christmas fair that destroyed most of the town centre. There were no injuries as people were in church.
- 1684 – Toompea (part of modern Tallinn), a fire destroyed most of the hilltop-town.
- 1689 – Fire of Skopje of 1689, present-day capital of North Macedonia was burned.
- 1692 – Two-thirds of Usingen, Germany, was razed, later replaced by a baroque town centre.
- 1694 – Great Fire of Warwick, England.
- 1696 – St. John's, Newfoundland, and 35 other settlements were burnt by French forces under Pierre Le Moyne d'Iberville.

== 18th century ==
- 1700 – Edinburgh, Scotland, over one half of the city was destroyed.
- 1702 – Uppsala, Sweden, devastated in large part and the cathedral and Uppsala Castle severely damaged.
- 1702 – Bergen, at the time the largest city in Norway, seven-eighths destroyed during a storm.
- 1707 – Xàtiva, the second most important city in the former Kingdom of Valencia, was burnt down as an exemplary punishment by the Bourbon king Philip V of Spain after besieging and conquering it.
- 1711 – Great Boston Fire of 1711. Destroyed the First Town-House.
- 1726 – Reutlingen, Germany, Free Imperial City, 80% of all residential houses and almost all public buildings destroyed, making 1,200 families homeless.
- 1728 – Copenhagen Fire of 1728, Denmark, two-fifths of the city burned down during three days. 3,650 families became homeless.
- 1731 – Blandford Forum, Dorset, England, a large majority of the town was destroyed on 4 June. The aftermath of this fire had an Act of Parliament passed stating that rebuilding work must be in brick and tile.
- 1731 – Tiverton fire, Devon, England, burnt nearly 300 houses.
- 1734 – Montreal, New France.
- 1752 – Fire destroys 18,000 houses in Moscow, 5–6 May.
- 1754 – The Great Fire of Hindon swept through the village of Hindon, Wiltshire, burning 144 houses and buildings to the ground.
- 1759 – The Second Great Stockholm Fire (Swedish: Mariabranden meaning brand = fire) in Södermalm, Stockholm, Sweden, destroyed about 300 buildings.
- 1760 – Fire in the town of Porvoo, Finland (then part of Sweden) burnt down most of the settlement on 11 June. Propagated by long drought and strong wind.
- 1760 – Great Boston Fire of 1760, 349 buildings destroyed.
- 1775 – Great Fire of Tartu, Estonia, nearly 200 buildings destroyed.

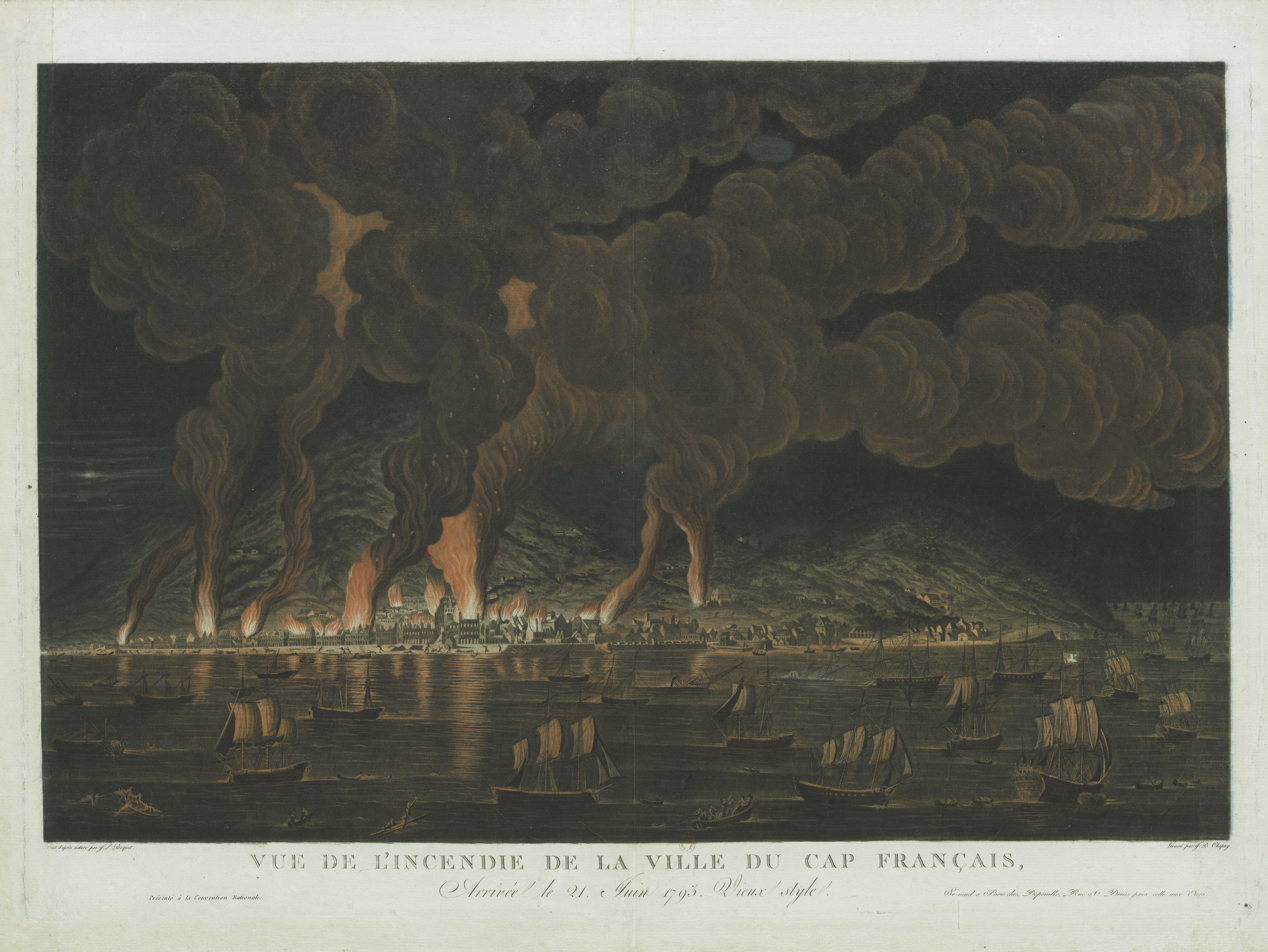
Fire of Cap Français, Haiti, 21 June 1793

- 1776 – First Great Fire of New York City of 1776.
- 1776 – Around two-thirds of Varaždin, the capital of Croatia at the time, destroyed in a fire of unknown origin.
- 1787 – Great Boston Fire of 1787. 100 buildings destroyed in the southern part of Boston.
- 1788 – First Great New Orleans Fire of 1788, 856 out of 1,100 structures burned.
- 1788 – Great Fire of Tenmei, Kyoto, Japan, 150 killed, 37,000 houses burned, on 6 March.
- 1793 – Cap Français (modern-day Cap-Haïtien, Haiti).
- 1794 – Second Great New Orleans Fire of 1794, 212 structures destroyed.
- 1795 – Copenhagen fire of 1795.

== 19th century ==
=== 1800s ===
- 1805 – Great Fire of 1805: Detroit, Michigan Territory, then a wooden frontier settlement, burnt except for a river warehouse.
- 1807 – The Second Battle of Copenhagen led to the burning of over a thousand buildings in the city, including the Church of Our Lady.

=== 1810s ===
- 1811 – Great Fire of Podil in Kiev, Russian Empire. Over 2,000 buildings, 12 churches and 3 abbeys destroyed; about 30 deaths.
- 1812 – The Fire of Moscow of 1812, which was started to deny shelter to Napoleon.
- 1812–1814 – The War of 1812 involved several major urban fires:
  - 1813 – Buffalo, New York.
  - 1813 – York, Upper Canada.
  - 1814 – Burning of Washington.
- 1813 – Portsmouth, New Hampshire.
- 1814 – Great fire of Tirschenreuth in Tirschenreuth, Bavaria, totally destroyed the town apart from the parish church and three neighboring buildings.
- 1817 – St. John's, Newfoundland.

=== 1820s ===
- 1820 – Ponce, Puerto Rico, a Spanish settlement, was almost completely destroyed on 27 February.
- 1820 – Great Savannah Fire burnt almost 500 structures, with damages of about US$4 million.
- 1821 – Paramaribo, Suriname, fire destroyed over 400 houses.
- 1821 – Great Fire of Fayetteville destroyed 500 buildings in the city.
- 1825 – The 1825 Miramichi Fire destroyed the city of Miramichi, New Brunswick.
- 1827 – Great Fire of Turku, Finland.
- 1829 – Fire destroyed hundreds of buildings in Augusta, Georgia.

=== 1830s ===
- 1831 – A fire in Fayetteville, North Carolina destroyed hundreds of buildings, and almost completely leveled the city.
- 1835 – Second Great Fire of New York City of 1835.
- 1838 – Charleston, South Carolina, over 1,000 buildings damaged.

=== 1840s ===
- 1842 – Great fire of Hamburg, about a quarter of the inner city destroyed, 51 killed, and an estimated 20,000 homeless.

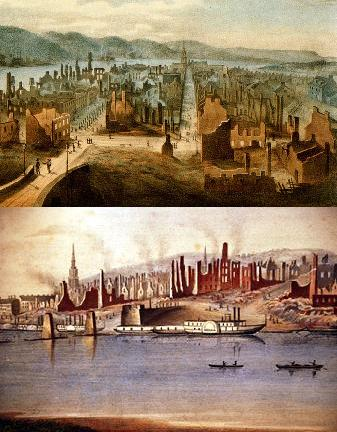
Views of Pittsburgh the day after the 1845 Great Fire. Detail from William Coventry wall print, "Great Conflagration at Pittsburgh."

- 1845 – Great New York City Fire of 1845, 345 buildings destroyed.
- 1845 – Great Fire of Pittsburgh destroyed over 1,000 buildings.
- 1845 – A fire at La Playa, the city port of Ponce, Puerto Rico, wiped out most of the Ponce vicinity in March.
- 1846 – Great Fire of 1846 in St. John's, Newfoundland, destroyed about 2,000 buildings and left 12,000 homeless.
- 1847 – Great Fire of Bucharest, Romania, 15 were killed and 1,850 buildings were destroyed, roughly one-third of the city.
- 1848 – Fire in Medina, Ohio, destroyed the entire business district.
- 1848 – A fire destroyed at least 500 buildings in Albany, New York.
- 1849 – St. Louis Fire of 1849, three were killed, including the first US firefighter ever killed in the line of duty.
- 1849 – First Great Fire of Toronto of 1849.

=== 1850s ===
- 1850 – Kraków Fire of 1850, Poland, affects 10% of the city area.
- 1851 – San Francisco Fire of 1851 destroyed 2,000 buildings.
- 1852 – Vaasa, Finland.
- 1852 – Great Montreal Fire of 1852 in Montreal left 10,000 of the city's 57,000 residents homeless.
- 1854 – The Great fire of Newcastle and Gateshead, England, started by a spectacular explosion, killed 53 and leveled substantial property in both towns.
- 1858 – A large fire in Auckland, New Zealand, destroyed 3 hotels, 20 shops, more than 50 houses, the police station, theater, post office and several other buildings in the centre of town, an entire city block. At the time Auckland had a population of about 6,300.
- 1858 – 1858 Christiania fire, Norway severely damaged the city.

=== 1860s ===
- 1862 – Troy, New York, 671 buildings destroyed.
- 1862 – Valparaíso, Chile was almost completely destroyed by a fire.
- 1863 – San Francisco Fire of 1863 destroyed an entire block in the downtown area of San Francisco.
- 1864 – Great Fire of Brisbane in Queensland, Australia, burnt over four city blocks with over 50 houses and dozens of businesses razed.
- 1861–1865 – The American Civil War involved several major city fires:
  - 1861 – Charleston, South Carolina.
  - 1861 – Lawrence, Kansas, Confederate raiders under William Quantrill burnt much of the town.
  - 1864 – Chambersburg, Pennsylvania, Confederate forces under John McCausland burnt the town after they fail to provide a ransom of $500,000 in US currency.
  - 1864 – Atlanta, Georgia, burnt after time given for evacuation of citizens by order of William Tecumseh Sherman.
  - 1865 – Columbia, South Carolina, burnt while being occupied by troops commanded by William Tecumseh Sherman.
  - 1865 – Richmond, Virginia, burnt by retreating Confederates.
- 1865 – 100 buildings destroyed in downtown Augusta, Maine.
- 1866 - The Crystal Palace in Sydney, Australia was destroyed by fire on 20 December. Called the Great Fire of the Crystal Palace, fine arts and tropical department was lost.
- 1866 – Great Portland Fire of 1866, Maine, destroyed the commercial district and left 10,000 homeless.
- 1866 – Great Fire of Quebec City, Quebec, razed an entire faubourg and left 20,000 homeless.
- 1868 – Auerbach in der Oberpfalz, Bavaria. Arson destroyed 107 houses and 146 other buildings; four deaths.
- 1869 – Great Fire of Whitstable of 1869, Kent, England, fed by strong winds, destroying 71 buildings.

=== 1870s ===
- 1870 – Fire in Medina, Ohio, started in a wooden building with a barber shop and consumed all but two blocks of the business district, nearly wiping out the entire town.
- 1871 – Fires deliberately set during the Paris Commune in May destroyed the Royal Palace of the Tuileries, the Louvre Library, the Palais de Justice, the Hôtel de Ville, the Gare de Lyon, and the Palais d'Orsay.
- 1871 – Strong winds fed several simultaneous fires in Wisconsin, Michigan and Illinois on 8–9 October named the Great Fires of 1871:
  - 1871 – Great Chicago Fire of 1871 destroyed the downtown on 8 October and died out the following night. About 250 dead.
  - 1871 – Peshtigo Fire of 1871, several towns destroyed in a firestorm that reached Michigan, 1,500–2,500 dead. Deadliest wildfire in US history.
  - 1871 – Great Michigan Fire of 1871 was a series of simultaneous fires, the most prominent of which was the Port Huron Fire, which killed over 200 people in Port Huron, Michigan.
  - 1871 – The Urbana fire destroyed central Urbana, Illinois, on 9 October.
- 1872 – Great Boston Fire of 1872, destroyed 776 buildings and killed at least 20 people.
- 1874 – Chicago Fire of 1874, 14 July, was in some respects very similar to the 1871 fire, but was stopped by a new fire-proof wall. It destroyed 812 structures and killed 20 people.
- 1875 – Great Whiskey Fire, Dublin, 18 June, killed 13 people, and destroyed a malt house, a bonded warehouse, houses and a tannery in Mill Street and Chamber Street.
- 1877 – Paris, Texas, the first of three fires that destroyed much of the town.
- 1877 – Saint John, New Brunswick, fire destroyed 1,600 buildings.
- 1878 – The Great Fire of Hong Kong destroyed 350 to 400 buildings across more than 10 acres (40,000 m^{2}) of central Hong Kong.
- 1879 – Hakodate fire, Hakodate, Hokkaidō, Japan, caused 67 fatalities, 20,000 homeless.
- 1879 – A large fire nearly destroyed the town of Deadwood, South Dakota destroying at least 300 buildings and killing one.
- 1879 – Great Reno Fire of 1879, which killed five people and destroyed about 350 structures.

=== 1880s ===
- 1880 – On 25 September, another fire took place destroying most of the older civil records (births, baptisms, marriages, etc.) of the Ponce, Puerto Rico, parish.
- 1881 – The Great Ryōgoku Fire and Hisamatsuchō Fire occurred in January and February, respectively, destroying over 20,000 homes in total in Tokyo, Japan.
- 1881 – Thumb Fire in Michigan burned over a million acres during a drought, 282 killed.
- 1882 - The exhibition building constructed to house the Sydney International Exhibition in 1879 in Sydney, Australia. On 22 September, 1882 it was completely destroyed by fire. It was designed by James Barnet and constructed by John Young, at a cost of £191,800 in only eight months.
- 1883 – In mid-August, a Great Fire broke out in Kuala Terengganu, Terengganu, destroying the royal palace and 1,600 buildings, many housing gunpowder.
- 1886 – Fire in Calgary, Alberta.
- 1886 – Great Vancouver Fire, Vancouver, British Columbia.
- 1888 – Sundsvall Fire of 1888, Sweden, left 9,000 homeless.
- 1889 – Great Seattle Fire, Washington, destroyed the central business district.
- 1889 – Great Spokane Fire, Washington, destroyed the downtown commercial district.
- 1889 – Great Ellensburg Fire, Washington, resulted in the city's bid to become the state capital ending in failure.
- 1889 – Great Bakersfield Fire of 1889, California, destroyed 196 buildings and killed one person.
- 1889 – The First Great Fire of Lynn, Massachusetts, destroyed about 100 buildings and took over two weeks to put out.

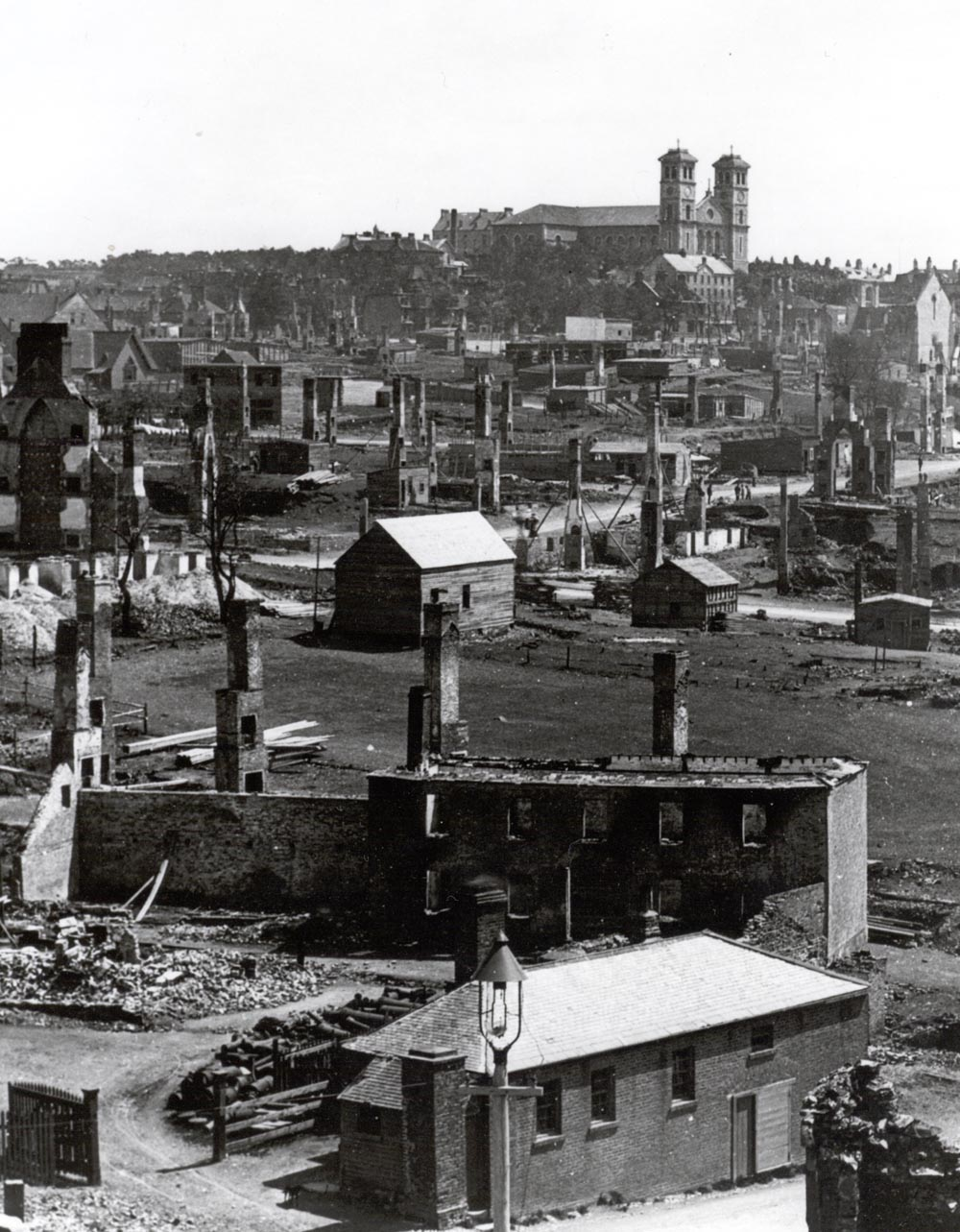
City of St. John's after the Great Fire of 1892

=== 1890s ===
- 1892 – Great Fire of 1892 in St. John's, Newfoundland.
- 1893 – Clarksville, Virginia, fire destroyed many of the blocks between the river (now the Kerr Reservoir) and 5th Street in the historic commercial core.
- 1894 – A large blaze destroyed much of downtown of Bath, Maine. The fire damaged a large area due to a burst pipe leaving no available water at the scene.
- 1894 – Great Hinckley Fire, Minnesota was a firestorm that destroyed several towns; over 400 killed.
- 1894 – A fire affected the business section of Frederick, South Dakota, causing over $100,000 in damage.
- 1894 – A great blaze destroyed the entirety of Sheffield, Iowa.
- 1894 – In a widely reported incident, a fire destroyed the entire downtown of Marion, North Carolina save one building, and destroyed 31 homes.
- 1894 – Almost the entirety of the business section of Edon, Ohio destroyed by a fire.
- 1894 – A fire nearly destroyed the town of Townshend, Vermont.
- 1894 – A fire in LaMoure, North Dakota destroyed the entire business center of the town.
- 1894 – A large fire destroyed much of Norway, Maine.
- 1894 – Great Fire in Hudson, Massachusetts caused by Independence Day celebrations destroyed a large area of the downtown and cost $500,000.
- 1894 – A fire starting in a barber shop engulfed the town of Gifford, Illinois.
- 1894 – Great Fire in Shanghai destroyed over 1,000 buildings.
- 1894 – Much of downtown El Paso, Illinois destroyed in a fire costing $250,000.
- 1894 – A fire in Conrad, Iowa destroyed the downtown, which was quickly rebuilt in brick.
- 1894 – The downtown of Dalton, Ohio was destroyed in a fire that was suspected to have been caused by arson, costing $250,000.
- 1894 – 10 business blocks and 50 houses were destroyed in a large fire in Chester Hill, Ohio, killing one.
- 1894 – A wildfire destroyed the entirety of Phillips, Wisconsin killing 20 people.
- 1896 – Paris, Texas, the second of three fires that destroyed much of the town.
- 1897 – The Great Fire of Windsor, Nova Scotia, Canada, destroyed 80% of the town.
- 1898 – Great Fire of New Westminster, British Columbia.
- 1898 – Great fire of Park City, Utah.
- 1899 – El Polvorin Fire in Ponce, Puerto Rico, occurred on 25 January Street. The fire started at the US Munitions Depot (on the lot currently occupied by the Ponce High School). The heroes in that fire are remembered with monuments and an obelisk in Plaza Las Delicias.

== 20th century ==
=== 1900s ===
- 1900 – Hull–Ottawa Fire of 1900, Canada. Starting in Hull, Quebec, the fire crossed the river to Ottawa, Ontario, and destroyed large areas of both cities.
- 1900 – Sandon, British Columbia, Canada, destroyed by fire.
- 1901 – Great Jacksonville Fire of 1901 in Jacksonville, Florida, destroyed the downtown area with flames seen for hundreds of miles.
- 1902 – The Great Fire of Mit Ghamr, Egypt.
- 1902 – The Great Conflagration of 1902, Paterson, New Jersey.
- 1902 – The town of Alexander City, Alabama, was completely destroyed by a large fire.
- 1903 – A fire destroyed over 400 buildings in Saint-Hyacinthe, Quebec.
- 1904 – Great Baltimore Fire of 1904.
- 1904 – Second Great Fire of Toronto of 1904.
- 1904 – Yazoo City, Mississippi fire, 25 May, destroyed entire business district of ca. 125 buildings; US$2,000,000 in damages.
- 1904 – Ålesund Fire, 850 buildings destroyed, c. 10,000 made homeless; the fire started during a violent storm.
- 1906 – San Francisco earthquake and fire.
- 1906 – Dundee Fire of 1906, Scotland, began at a whiskey warehouse with alcohol explosions spreading flames, several blocks burnt.
- 1907 – Hakodate, Hokkaido, Japan, a fire that broke out in the evening of 25 August burnt for six hours, destroying an estimated 60–70% of the city, leaving 60,000+ homeless and causing at least 8,000,000 yen in property damage, including many of the city's historical buildings destroyed.
- 1908 – First Great Chelsea Fire on April 12. Nearly half the city of Chelsea, Massachusetts, was destroyed.
- 1908 – A fire destroyed most of the town of Fernie, British Columbia.
- 1908 – The greater part of the city of Trois-Rivières was destroyed by a fire; most of the city's original buildings, many dating to the French colonial years, were destroyed.
- 1909 – Phoenix, British Columbia, destroyed by fire, then rebuilt.

=== 1910s ===
- 1910 – Lake Charles fire in Lake Charles, Louisiana, $750,000 worth of damage, 85 dead.
- 1910 – Great Fire of Fort Smith Arkansas.
- 1911 – Oscoda/AuSable, Michigan.
- 1911 – Great Fire of 1911 in Bangor, Maine, destroyed hundreds of buildings.
- 1911 – Great Porcupine Fire in Porcupine, Ontario. Destroyed up to 494,000 acres of forest.
- 1912 – Houston, Texas, 56 city blocks; Houston's largest fire.
- 1912 – Maryland Agricultural College, now the University of Maryland.
- 1914 – Great Salem Fire of 1914, Massachusetts.
- 1916 – Bergen, Norway. About 300 buildings razed.
- 1916 – Matheson Fire, Matheson, Ontario. Destroyed approximately 490,000 acres of land.
- 1916 – Paris, Texas Fire of 1916. Largest of 3 historical fires that destroyed most of the central business district and a large residential section.
- 1917 – The Halifax Explosion, the largest man-made explosion before the atomic bomb, sparked fires throughout Halifax, Nova Scotia.
- 1917 – Great Atlanta fire of 1917, during which over 300 acres (1.2 km^{2}, 73 blocks) were destroyed.
- 1917 – Great Thessaloniki Fire of 1917, Thessaloniki, Greece. About 9,500 buildings were destroyed.
- 1917 – In Gyöngyös, Hungary, a fire destroyed a number of buildings, leaving around 8,000 people homeless.
- 1919 – A wildfire destroyed the town of Lac La Biche, Alberta causing an estimated $200,000 in damage.

=== 1920s ===
- 1920 – The Burning of Cork, Ireland, a fire set on 11 December by the British Auxiliaries in revenge after an ambush by the IRA destroyed much of the old city centre of Cork.
- 1921 – The Tulsa race massacre resulted in the destruction of 35 city blocks and 1,256 residences by arson.
- 1922 - The Fire of Manisa, Manisa, Greek Zone of Smyrna.
- 1922 – The Great Fire of Smyrna, Smyrna, Greek Zone of Smyrna, estimated at least 10,000 and up to 100,000 Greeks and Armenians killed.
- 1922 – On 2 September, fire destroyed most of downtown Frisco, Texas.
- 1922 – Most of downtown Astoria, Oregon burnt.
- 1922 – The Great Fire of 1922 in the Timiskaming District, Ontario, Canada, killed 43 people and burnt down 18 townships.
- 1923 – 1923 Tokyo fire following the Great Kantō earthquake razed half the city with over 100,000 deaths.
- 1923 – 1923 Berkeley Fire, California, destroyed at least 640 structures.
- 1925 – 1925 Decatur St. Fire, Atlanta, Georgia, left six firefighters dead, eight others seriously injured.
- 1928 – Great Fall River fire of 1928, Massachusetts.

=== 1930s ===
- 1931 – Napier and Hastings, New Zealand. Fire engulfed much of these twin cities in the aftermath of the 1931 Hawke's Bay earthquake.
- 1931 – Downtown fire in Marshfield, Wisconsin, killed six on 28 March.
- 1931 – Half of downtown Lillooet, British Columbia, Canada, was destroyed by fire.
- 1934 – Hakodate, Hokkaido, a household fire began on 21 March and spread to the surrounding areas including a local court, department store, school and hospital. Over two days 2,166 people lost their lives, with 9,485 injured, 145,500 people made homeless, and 11,055 buildings lost.
- 1938 – 1938 Changsha fire, 56,000 buildings burnt by the Chinese army during the Second Sino-Japanese War to prevent the Japanese from getting resources, 3,000 civilians killed.
- 1939 – Luftwaffe Bombing of Warsaw on 1 September, at the outbreak of World War II, left an estimated 1,500 killed.
- 1939 – Great Lagunillas Fire at Ciudad Ojeda, Venezuela, on 14 November.

=== 1940s ===
- 1940–1945 – Air raids during World War II resulted in many major city fires:
  - 1940 – Bombing of Rotterdam, 14 May, forcing the capitulation of the Dutch government. 800 killed, 24.000 houses destroyed, 80,000 left homeless.
  - 1940 – Second Great Fire of London, one of the most destructive air raids of The Blitz. 1,500 were killed.
  - 1942 – German air bombardment of Stalingrad, Soviet Union, resulting in firestorm and 955 fatalities (original Soviet estimate).
  - 1943 – Hamburg, 45,000 killed (largest in an air-raid on Germany).
  - 1943 – Kassel, 10,000 killed.
  - 1944 – Braunschweig, 2,600 killed but 30,000 rescued.
  - 1944 – Darmstadt, 12,000 killed.
  - 1944 – Heilbronn, 6,500 killed.
  - 1945 – Dresden, around 30,000 killed in firestorm during one of the most controversial Allied air-raids.
  - 1945 – Pforzheim, a quarter of the town's population (17,000) killed.
  - 1945 – Hildesheim, 1,500 killed.
  - 1945 – Tokyo, the largest urban conflagration in history, with over 100,000 killed.
  - 1945 – Würzburg, 5,000 killed.
  - 1945 – Kobe, 8,800 killed.
  - 1945 – Atomic bombings of Hiroshima and Nagasaki, 105,000 to 120,000 killed; large fires in each city.
- 1941 – The great fire of Santander, Spain, destroyed the greater part of the medieval town centre.
- 1944 – Destruction of Warsaw by the German army and Waffen SS, as a reprisal for the Warsaw Uprising, included the deliberate burning of many buildings.
- 1946 – Bandung, a city in West Java, Indonesia, was burnt on 24 March by Indonesians to prevent the Dutch from retaking the city, an event called "Bandung sea of fire."
- 1947 – Texas City Disaster, two ships exploded, igniting fires throughout the city and chemical works, 460–600 killed.
- 1948 – Fukui earthquake with fire, 46,000 buildings and houses lost on 28 June.
- 1949 – A fire burned for 18 hours in Chongqing's waterfront and banking district, on 2 September, killed 2,865 people and left more than 100,000 homeless. 7,000 buildings were destroyed.

=== 1950s ===
- 1952 – The Cairo fire, Egypt.
- 1953 – Shek Kip Mei fire in a squatter area in Hong Kong left 58,000 homeless.
- 1953 – Busan station fire in South Korea, 3,132 houses destroyed, 30,000 displaced.
- 1954 – 1954 Iwanai Fire, an affective strong wind by Typhoon Marie in Hokkaido on 26 September, according to a Japan Fire and Disaster Management Agency official confirmed report, 38 persons perished, 551 persons were hurt, total 261.4 acres were lost.
- 1954 – Busan Yongdusan fires in South Korea. Two fires within weeks of each other caused the destruction of hundreds of shanty buildings and more than 3,400 National Treasures.
- 1955 – The Freeman Pier Fire in Seaside Heights & Seaside Park, New Jersey. At least 30 businesses lost, 50 residents evacuated, no major injuries.
- 1956 – Franklin Street fire in New Haven, Connecticut, killed 15 on 25 January.

=== 1960s ===
- 1961 – Bukit Ho Swee fire, flames erupt in a squatter settlement in Singapore, making 16,000 homeless.
- 1961 – Brentwood-Bel Air fire in Los Angeles, burned 6,090 acres (24.6 km^{2}) and destroyed 484 homes.
- 1963 – Fretz Building, Philadelphia, Pennsylvania, 12-alarm fire was the largest in city history. 50 homes and multiple businesses destroyed along with original fire building.
- 1964 – The Bellflower Street Conflagration in Boston destroyed 19 apartment buildings and damaged 11.
- 1966 – Fire in Iloilo City, the Philippines, devastated most of the downtown area.

=== 1970s ===
- 1973 – Second Great Chelsea Fire on 14 October destroyed 18 city blocks.
- 1974 – Chelsea, Massachusetts, a 24 May fire at the American Barrel Company spread to several other businesses in a two block area.

=== 1980s ===
- 1981 – Arson-initiated firestorm in Lynn, Massachusetts levelled downtown factory area under redevelopment.
- 1982 – Keane fire, Alberta, Canada, consumed more than 500,000 hectares of forest.
- 1982 – Village of Lopez, Sullivan County, Pennsylvania, entire business district, including two hotels and the fire department leveled by a wind-whipped fire. It also sparked a 100-acre forest fire nearby.
- 1983 – 1983 Buffalo propane explosion in Buffalo, New York killed five firefighters and two others and destroyed millions in property.
- 1983 – Dushore, Pennsylvania A fire destroyed two blocks of the historic business district, eight businesses and four homes. The fire was intentionally set.
- 1984 – Oil spill set fire to the shantytown of Vila Socó, Cubatão, São Paulo, Brazil, on 25 February; official death toll is 93 people although speculation is more than 200.
- 1985 – MOVE incident in Philadelphia destroyed 65 houses on Osage Avenue and left 250 homeless. 11 people died in the fire or were shot by police trying to escape.
- 1985 – Annanar forest fire, Portugal, 1,500 km^{2} destroyed, killing 14.
- 1986 – Chu Ku Tsai village fire, Hong Kong, left 2,000 homeless on Lunar New Year holiday.
- 1986 – Aberdeen Typhoon Shelter fire, Aberdeen, Hong Kong, 150 vessels destroyed, 1,700 homeless and 2 injured on 25 December.
- 1988 – Great Lashio Fire, Lashio, Myanmar, killed 134 and destroyed 2,000 buildings.
- 1988 – A fire in Lisbon, Portugal, destroyed seven blocks of houses (7,500 m^{2}) on 25 August.
- 1988 – The Perkasie, Pennsylvania, fire destroyed one and a half blocks of its historic downtown.

=== 1990s ===
- 1990 – A tanker truck carrying LPG overturned and exploded on New Phetchaburi Road, Bangkok, Thailand. The fire and explosion burned 51 shop-houses, killed 88, injured 36.
- 1991 – An 18 wheeler-truck carrying electric detonators and dynamite (total weight of 20 tons), from Phuket to Saraburi, turned over and exploded after some people tried to break open the container, caused fire and killed more than 100, injured 100 and destroyed surrounding building, the blast radius reached 1 km.
- 1991 – Oakland Hills firestorm killed 25 and destroyed 3,469 homes and apartments.
- 1993 – A tsunami and fires occurred at Okushiri Island, Japan, following the 12 July Hokkaidō earthquake, with 645 houses lost and 202 people killed.
- 1995 – Great Hanshin earthquake with fire, Kobe, Japan.

== 21st century ==
=== 2000s ===
- 2001 – Terrorist attacks of 11 September 2001. Of the initial casualties, approximately 2,600 deaths (including 343 firefighters and 71 law enforcement officers) were caused by fires that followed the crashes of jetliners into the World Trade Center towers in New York. At the Pentagon in Washington, D.C., 125 people were killed by the plane crash and subsequent fire.
- 2001 – A wildfire destroyed 290,000 acres of land in the hamlet of Chisholm, Alberta.
- 2002 – Lagos armoury explosion caused fires in Northern Lagos, Nigeria, which killed at least 1,100 people.
- 2002 – Edinburgh Cowgate fire, Scotland, 150 people fled their homes but there were no injuries.
- 2002 – Rodeo–Chediski Fire.
- 2003 – Canberra bushfires killed four and destroyed over 500 homes.
- 2003 – Cedar Fire, San Diego, tenth-largest California brush fire that killed 15 and destroyed 2,232 homes.
- 2007 – Greek forest fires destroyed 2,100 buildings.
- 2008 – Camden Market Fire, which caused severe damage to one of North London's most famous shopping districts.
- 2009 – Black Saturday Bushfires of 7 February 2009 in Victoria, Australia, resulted in 173 deaths.

=== 2010s ===
- 2010 – 2010 Thai political protests in Bangkok, burnt BEC TV3, CentralWorld and many buildings.
- 2010 – Dhaka fire kills 117 people in the Nimtali area of Old Dhaka, Bangladesh.
- 2011 – Devastating fire in Manila, Philippines, left about 8,000 people homeless and 9 injured in a Makati squatter community.
- 2011 – A wildfire destroyed over 400 buildings and cost an estimated $750 million in damage in Slave Lake, Alberta.
- 2012 – Hurricane Sandy caused a six-alarm fire that destroyed 121 homes in Breezy Point, Queens, New York.
- 2013 – Yarnell Hill Fire burnt over 13 square miles, destroyed over 100 homes, and killed 19 firefighters.
- 2013 – Lac-Mégantic derailment caused an explosion and fire in the town centre that destroyed over 30 buildings and killed 46. The event was the deadliest train accident in Canada since 1864.
- 2013 – Boardwalk fire in Seaside Heights & Seaside Park, New Jersey. At least 19 buildings destroyed, 30 businesses lost, no major injuries.
- 2014 – Valparaíso wildfire devastated several areas of Valparaíso, Chile, destroying 2,500 homes and killing at least 15 people.
- 2015 – 420 homes burnt down in Shira, Russia during the 2015 Russian wildfires.
- 2015 – Tianjin Port fire and explosions killed at least 173 people, damaged 300 buildings and over 10,000 vehicles.
- 2016 – Fort McMurray wildfire in Alberta destroyed approximately 2,400 homes and buildings, and forced a complete evacuation.
- 2016 – The Gatlinburg Fire began as a wildfire in the Great Smoky Mountains National Park, and spread into the town of Gatlinburg, Tennessee, killing 14.
- 2016 – A fire started in a ramen shop burnt 140 buildings in Itoigawa, Japan.
- 2017 – October 2017 Iberian wildfires. A fire started in Galicia, a province with high risk of wildfire and spread dangerously quick thanks to Hurricane Ophelia (2017) through Spain and Portugal.
- 2017 – On 17 October, separate fires raged across five counties in northern California, causing extensive damage in Sonoma and Napa Counties. The fires burnt 160,000 acres, destroyed 5,700 buildings, and killed 43. The two largest fires were the Tubbs Fire and Atlas Fire. The city of Santa Rosa, California sustained heavy damage, with over 2,800 buildings destroyed.
- 2018 – Kemerovo fire at the Winter Cherry complex mall in Kemerovo, Russia, killed 60 people. The blaze started on the top floor of the four-story complex, and people were seen jumping from windows to escape it.
- 2018 – Camp Fire. California's deadliest and most destructive wildfire left at least 81 people dead and torched more than 152,000 acres. The fire burnt through the towns of Paradise and Concow and other populated areas including Magelia, CenterVille and Butte Creek Canyon, and destroyed the historic Honey Run Covered Bridge, one of the last three-tier bridges that stood in the US.
- 2018 – Between 23 July and 25 July, Greece experienced a national tragedy when a huge fire near Marathon in Attika killed 100 people. The inefficient fire service is said to have been a major factor for the disastrous outcome. The fire broke out in a nearby forest and quickly expanded to the surrounding towns.
- 2019 – Another Dhaka fire killed 78 people on 20 February in Churihatta, Chawkbazar area of old Dhaka, Bangladesh.

=== 2020s ===
- 2020 – The Almeda Drive Fire in Jackson County, Oregon burnt down the towns of Talent and Phoenix.
- 2020 – The Beachie Creek Fire in Marion County, Oregon destroyed the towns of Detroit and Gates. The fire erupted due to historic winds causing downed powerlines throughout the Santiam Canyon on 8 September, causing the death of five people.
- 2020 – Arson damage from 164 structure fires during the George Floyd protests in Minneapolis–Saint Paul resulted in one death.
- 2020 – August 2020 California lightning wildfires in northern coastal area of California burnt millions of acres and several thousand homes.
- 2021 – A fire burnt a number of homes in Nowa Biala, Poland.
- 2021 – The Lytton Creek Wildfire in Lytton, British Columbia destroyed 90% of the town of Lytton.
- 2021 – The Caldor Fire burnt Grizzly Flats, California and Omo Ranch, California.
- 2021 – A fire broke out in the town of El Cayo on the cay of Bonacca which is part of an island named Guanaja. The fire injured four residents and destroyed more than 200 structures.
- 2021 – 50+ MPH winds blew the West Wind Fire into Denton, Montana, burning 25 homes and several other outbuildings including the town's grain elevators.
- 2021 – Over 1,000 homes burnt, and at least one person died in Marshall, Superior, and Louisville, Colorado in the Marshall fire.
- 2023 – 2023 Hawaii wildfires. In the most significant wildfire event in Hawaiian history, the city of Lahaina suffered widespread devastation. This fire is believed to have killed 102+ people, destroying over 2,000 homes, as well as several historic landmarks in Lahaina.
- 2023 – Most of Enterprise, Northwest Territories is destroyed by wildfire.
- 2024 – Stinnett, Texas was almost completely engulfed by the Smokehouse Creek Fire with over 500 structures destroyed.
- 2024 – Jasper, Alberta was half destroyed by a wildfire.
- 2025 – Los Angeles.
- 2025 – Palacios de Jamuz in Spain was severely damaged in the 2025 European and Mediterranean wildfires.
- 2025 – Oita City Fire destroyed 170 buildings and killed one. Described as the largest urban fire in Japan in nearly 50 years.
- 2025 – Wang Fuk Court fire destroyed 7 out of 8 buildings in a housing estate. Described as the largest urban fire in Hong Kong in over 60 years. Killed at least 168.
- 2026 – Namaygoosisagagun First Nation, Ontario is destroyed by a wildfire.
- 2026 – The Krokstadelva fire destroyed 100 homes in Krokstadelva, Norway.
- 2026 – The complex of 3 fires, Old Trails, Fairview, and Autumn Lane in the Spokane area.

== See also ==
- List of fires
  - List of building or structure fires
  - List of transportation fires
  - List of forest fires
  - List of wildfires
- Conflagration § Notable examples
- Firestorm § City firestorms
- Coal seam fire
- Oil well fire
