= Bakersfield Department of Development Services =

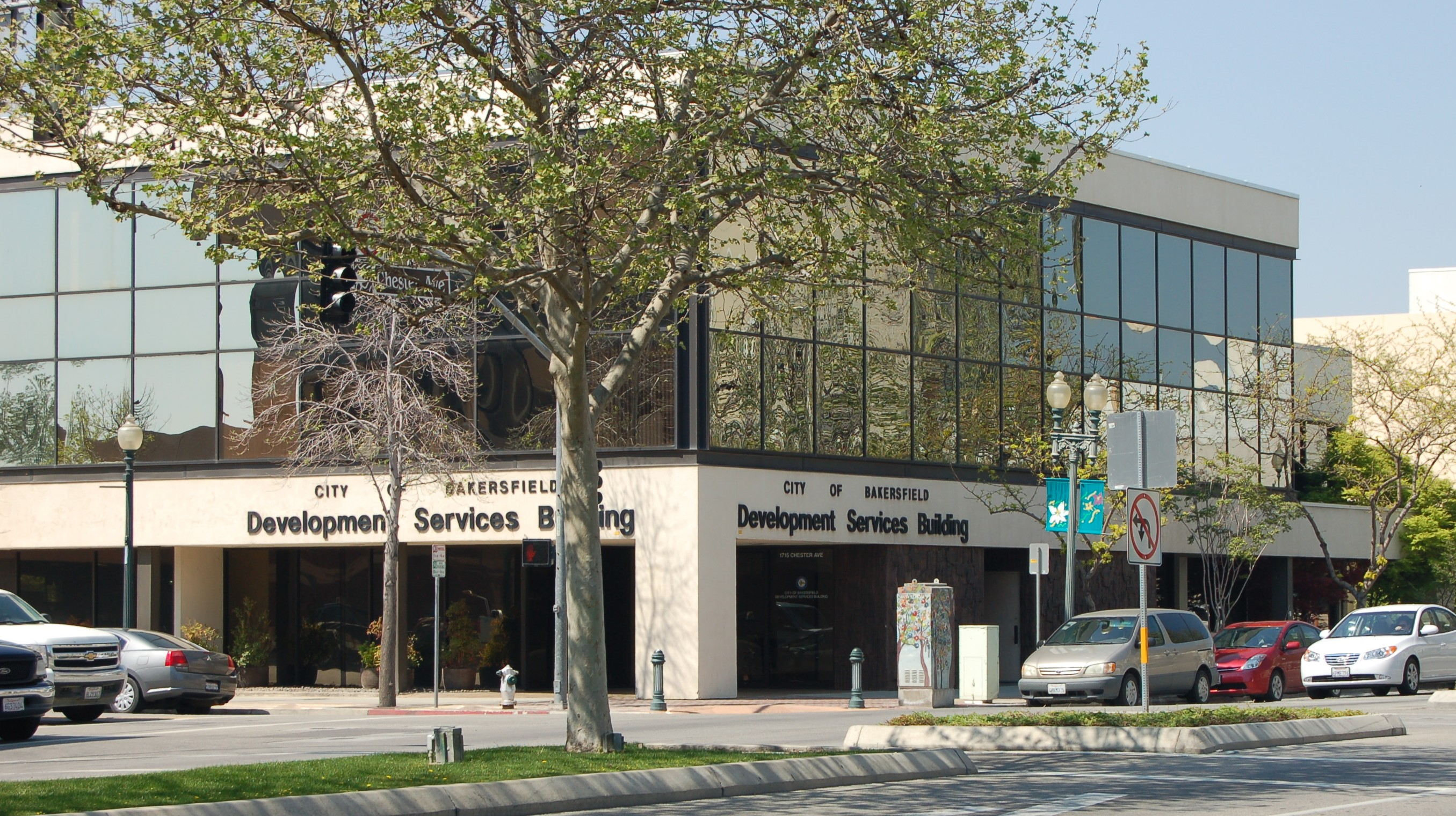
- Department Headquarters

Agency overview
- Preceding agencies: Building Department; Planning Department
- Jurisdiction: Bakersfield, California
- Headquarters: Development Services Building; 35°22′28″N 119°01′09″W
- Annual budget: $8.2 million (2009-10)
- Agency executive: Development Services Director
- Website: bakersfieldcity.us/cityservices/devsrv

The Bakersfield Department of Development Services is a department of the city of Bakersfield, California. The department enforces the city's building codes and land use policies. It also issues building permits, and give approval for new land development. It also provides inspections of new and existing buildings.

The department was formed from the consolidation of the Building Department and the Planning Department (which became the Building Division and Planning Division). It is headquartered in the Development Services Building at the intersection of 17th Street and Chester Ave, in the Civic Center, downtown.

== History ==
=== Building Division ===
Bakersfield's building code has seen large changes as a result of two major disasters. They would also drastically change the look of the city. The first was the Great Fire of 1889. Prior to the fire, most of the city was constructed out of wood. This allowed the fire to spread quickly from building to building. After the fire, it was decided the buildings in the central business district would be constructed of non flammable materials. This also changed the look of the city from a "frontier town" to a "metropolitan city".

The second event was the 1952 earthquake. Similar to the great fire, a lot of the city was destroyed. When examined, most of the buildings that survived were reinforced structures (primarily reinforced concrete). Many of the buildings that fell were built with non-reinforced brick. When the city was rebuilt, it was required that large structures be constructed with reinforced materials.

=== Planning Division ===
Bakersfield's planning department has faced some major challenges in the development of the city. One of the largest was the integration of Central Bakersfield with East Bakersfield (former town of Sumner and later Kern City). Constructed by Southern Pacific, after a land dispute with the city, East Bakersfield's street layout had three major differences. The two cities had streets of different widths; Bakersfield's streets were approximately 20 feet wider. Bakersfield's streets were layout parallel to north/south and east/west while East Bakersfield's streets were parallel to Southern Pacific's tracks; about 30 degrees different. Also, the streets did not match up. The north sidewalk of a Bakersfield street almost lined up with the south sidewalk of the corresponding East Bakersfield street.

Several decisions were made to resolve the problems. First, Union Avenue would be the dividing line between the two regions. Streets would be constructed parallel to existing streets in both areas up to Union. Minor streets would simple terminate, with a medium separating the two. Major streets would directly connect at Union (creating an intersection) and then transition between the two street systems within one block. Most of this was done on the eastside, where there was less development, but some were done on the west.
