= 2021 Guanaja fire =

Fire in Guanaja, Honduras

- Date: 2 October 2021
- Location: Guanaja Island, Bay Islands, Honduras; 16.441877°N 85.887055°W
- Type: Fire
- Cause: Unknown
- Injuries: 4

On 2 October 2021, a large fire occurred in the town of El Cayo on a cay named Bonacca which is part of an island named Guanaja off the north coast of Honduras. The fire started around daybreak and spread quickly into businesses and homes. It forced hundreds of residents to evacuate and flee for safety. No-one was killed; four people were injured in the blaze and hospitalized. The cause of the fire is still unknown.

== Events ==
=== Start of the fire ===
The unexpected fire started around dawn and minutes after the blaze had sparked, it had already spread into structures, which were mostly made out of wood. During the blaze, people had raced into their homes to grab any of their belongings as quickly as possible and grab buckets full of water to keep the blaze from growing any further, although they struggled to bring it under control because they have no fire service on the island. Several videos of the fire show the inferno spreading quickly and people evacuating out the island by boat with all of their furniture and belongings.

=== Emergency response ===
Hours later, while the fire was still burning, the Honduran Air Force kept dropping water on the blaze to douse the flames. After the fire was under control, police helped people gather what's left of their possessions. Humanitarian aid was provided for people mostly affected by the blaze that occurred during daybreak. Some shelters were put on the main island of Guanaja for residents who lost their homes.

== Aftermath ==
As a result, the fire destroyed over 200 homes and businesses and damaged 120 more. More than 400 people were displaced because of the inferno. There were no deaths reported and there were only 4 injuries. The cause of the fire is still under investigation. The fire was fully contained at around 11:00am (CST) on 3 October 2021.

== See also ==
- List of fires
- List of town and city fires
