= 1953 Busan station fire =

Fire in Busan, South Korea

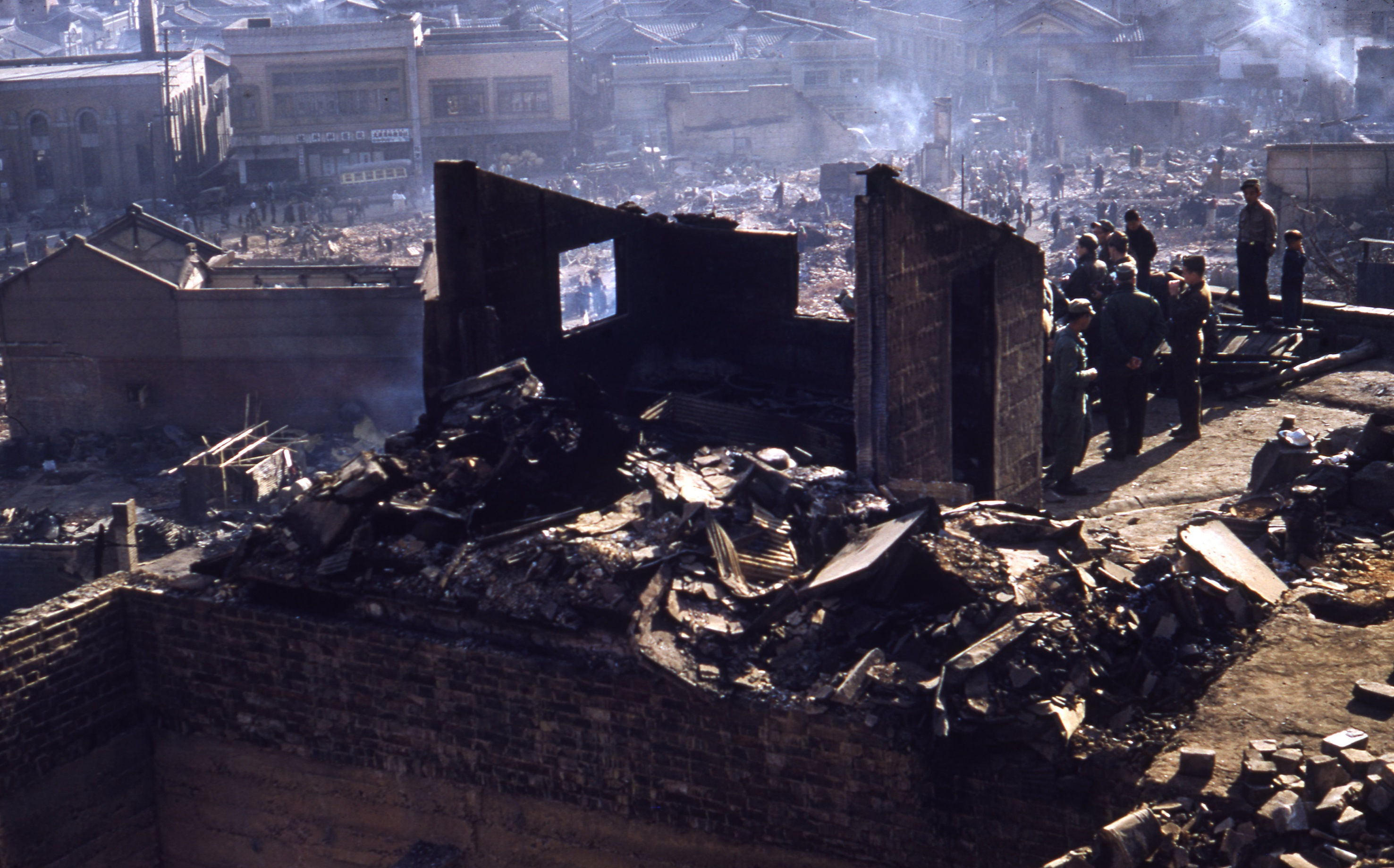
- Soldiers inspecting damage just after the fire
- Date: November 27–28, 1953
- Time: 8:20 p.m. (KST)
- Duration: 14 hours
- Location: Busan, South Korea
- Property damage: 3,132 houses destroyed, major buildings in the downtown area destroyed, total damages of 200 billion hwan
- Displaced: 30,000

The 1953 Busan station fire (Korean: 부산역전 대화재; Hanja: 釜山驛前大火災) was a major fire on November 27, 1953, in the vicinity of the old Busan station in Busan, South Korea.

== Background ==
Before the 1950–1953 Korean War, Busan's infrastructure could accommodate around 300,000 people. However, during the war the population surged to around 1,000,000 due to the arrival of war refugees. The refugees set up numerous shanty towns in the city. These settlements often had poor access to water and utilities, and were often highly flammable. A number of fires broke out in these settlements. The refugee population did not decrease even after the July 1953 signing of the Korean Armistice Agreement, which froze the conflict. Even more people entered the city and settled in these impromptu settlements.

== Fire ==
Around 8:20 p.m. on November 27, 1953, a fireplace fire in a room belonging to Heo Do-yeong (허도영; 許道榮), in Yeongju-dong began spreading. Due to strong winds, the fire traveled quickly, and came to affect around 1,250 houses and major buildings in the downtown area, centered around Busan station. The fire raged for around 14 hours, and was only completely extinguished by 10:20 a.m. the following morning.

=== Aftermath ===
The fire destroyed 3,132 houses, caused 29 deaths, and displaced around 30,000 people in 6,000 households. The damages cost around 200 billion hwan. The fire destroyed the old Busan station building; the current Busan station was constructed in a different spot in 1968.

The city government organized relief efforts, and relocated displaced people elsewhere. The government also worked on constructing more permanent housing and demolishing other shanty towns. United Nations Command soldiers in the city, under general Richard S. Whitcomb, distributed their own supplies for the refugees, and ended up assisting 23,100 people. Its engineers worked to clear the burned remains and construct temporary facilities for the displaced people. Whitcomb ordered the distribution in violation of U.S. military law; for this he was summoned to the U.S.

Much of what was destroyed was not reconstructed promptly.

== Legacy ==
There is a memorial at Exit 12 of Jungang station to the fire.

== See also ==
- 1953 Gukje Market fire
- 1954 Busan Yongdusan fires
