= Guanaja =

Island in Central America

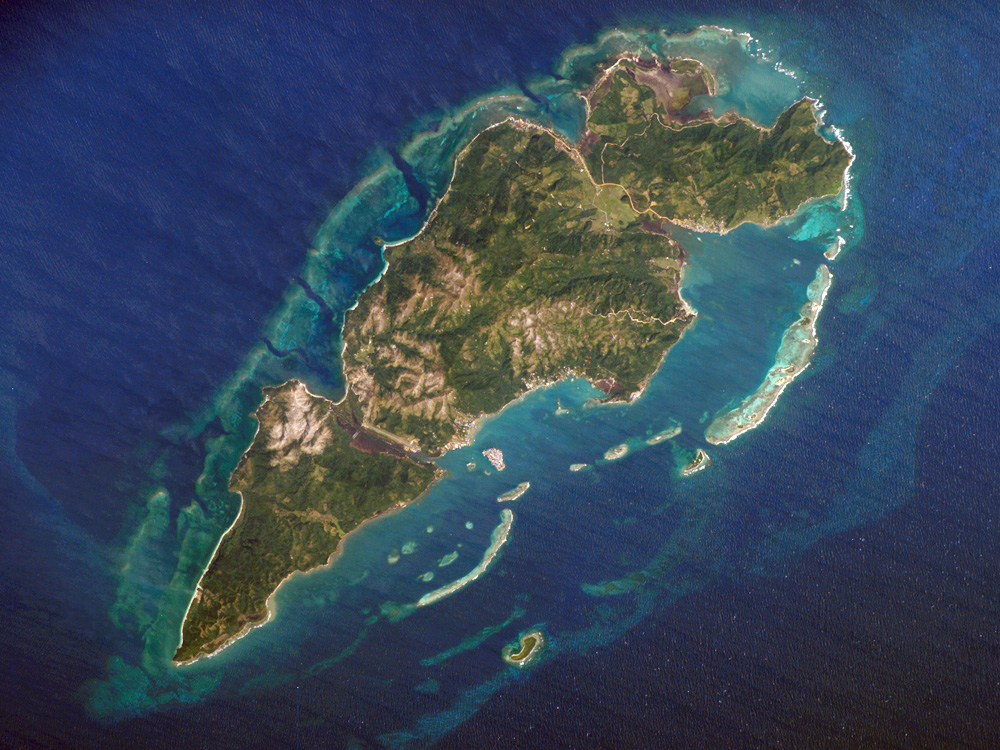
- NASA satellite photograph of Guanaja

- Location within Honduras Location within the Caribbean

Geography
- Location: Caribbean Sea
- Coordinates: 16°28′N 85°53′W
- Archipelago: Bay Islands
- Area: 50 km^{2} (19 sq mi)

Administration
- Honduras
- Department: Islas de la Bahía

Demographics
- Population: 5538 (2015)

Ramsar Wetland
- Official name: Sistema de Humedales de la Isla de Guanaja
- Designated: 25 October 2021
- Reference no.: 2456

Guanaja is one of the Bay Islands of Honduras and is in the Caribbean. It is about 70 kilometres (43 mi) off the north coast of Honduras, and 12 kilometres (7.5 mi) from the island of Roatan. One of the cays off Guanaja, also called Guanaja or Bonacca or Low Cay (or just simply, The Cay), is near the main island, and contains most of the approximately 5,538 people who live in Guanaja. The densely populated cay has been described as the Venice of Honduras because of the waterways that run through it. The other two main settlements on Guanaja are Mangrove Bight and Savannah Bight. Smaller settlements includes Pelican Reef, East End and North East Bight.

The primary source of income for the islanders is fishing and shrimping. Tourism is confined to a handful of small resorts that cater to divers, snorkelers and adventure travellers. The island's warm, clear waters support an extensive coral reef that is part of the Mesoamerican Barrier Reef and second only to the Great Barrier Reef off the coasts of Australia. Currently, there is still access to fresh water on Guanaja, and several waterfalls can be seen. Since 2021 the entire island and its cays have been designated as a protected Ramsar site.

== History ==
Christopher Columbus landed on Guanaja on his fourth voyage in 1502. Notably, this was the first time he came across cacao, which is the core of chocolate. He landed on Soldado Beach on the north side of the island. In later years Cayman Islanders settled in the Bay Islands, which explains the diffusion of Spanish and English language.

Homer Hickam was one of the first scuba explorers of Guanaja, first visiting in 1973. Along with a team of other scuba explorers, he extensively mapped the reef system around the island for sport divers. He still owns property on the northeast end of the island.

In late October 1998, most of the buildings and homes on the island were destroyed by Hurricane Mitch. The islanders have since rebuilt, and although there are still repercussions to the economy from Mitch, tourism has been recovering. The majority of the mangrove and pine forests, which were destroyed as a direct consequence of the passage of the hurricane sweeping across the island for two days, are slowly making a comeback.

Guanaja was also known as:

- Caguamara (1600)
- Isla Pinos (1600)
- Guanaca (1601)
- Guanaia (1657)
- Guanaja (1749)
- Bonaccao (1771)
- Bonacca (1779)

Inhabited by the Payans Indian, Christopher Columbus landed 30 July 1502, Pedro Moreno landed in 1524, Spanish slaves raids 1516–1526, buccaneering during 16th and 17th century and removal of Indians to Golfete Dulce. British Colony of Bay Islands 1852. Ceded to The Republic of Honduras 1861.

=== Traditions on special holidays ===
The residents of Guanaja also have a different culture, so each important date in the year should be highlighted; for example, on 15 September (independence from Honduras), 31 October (Halloween), 25 December (Christmas) etc. What they call Old Junk or Junkanoo (old garbage) is a group of people in masks wearing old rags even up to palm trees and running through the streets of El Cayo or The Key they consider it something very fun to be part of their culture and something that has been done for years.

=== Settlers of Guanaja ===
In 1502, Christopher Columbus came to this island. He called it Isla de Los Pinos (Isle of Pines) although it was already known as Guanaca by its inhabitants. This name appears as early as 1511 on the Peter Martyr map, but it later was modified by English pirates, privateers and settlers and was pronounced Bonacca. There have been other names for the island over the years before the Bay Islands were turned over to Honduras as the English, the Dutch and the Spaniards modified the name to their liking.

Upon gaining possession of the Bay Islands the Honduran government made Guanaja the official name of the island but the residents kept the old name for as long as they could and older inhabitants throughout the islands still call it Bonacca. The main settlement is called The Cay, an abbreviation of Lower Cays, the original name. It was first settled by the Haylocks who had moved to the two little cays that lay about a half kilometre off the south shore of the main island to get rid of the flies that plagued them during calm nights. They eventually stayed and later deeded the southernmost cay (Hog Cay) to the Kirkconnells. Many other families, among others the Boddens (later a portion of Boddens were renamed Bordens), the Phillips and the Woods, came later and by the 1880s a thriving community had developed.

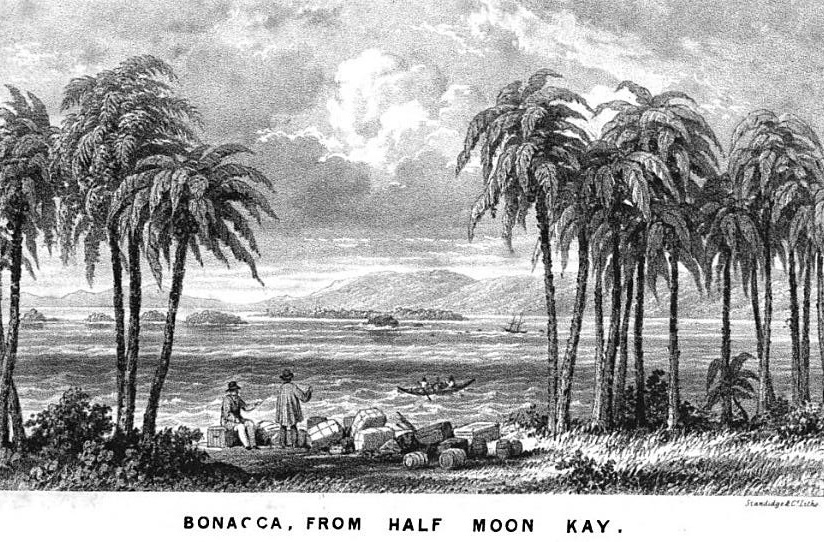
Bonacca c. 1842

The village of Savana Bight was founded by families from Olancho; they were the Escalantes, the Peraltas, and the Zunigas. Later the Watlers from the Cayman Islands took up residence there as well.

Later on, and also from Grand Cayman, came the Tatums, the Merrens, the Bennetts, the Forbes and others, who set up residence east of Savana Bight, calling the area East End, while the Parchmonts settled in some of the upper Cays. The first families to settle in North East Bight were the Ebanks, the Hydes and the Greenwoods. Angelo Elwin, son of the first magistrate of the Bay Island who resided in Roatan, was the first person to settle on the upper north side of the island. Elwin's bride was a Moore and three or four of her brothers followed her from Barbarat to Bonacca. The Moores like the Elwins had come to the Bay Islands from Belize. Unlike other settlers, Angelo Elwin was in possession of a deed signed by the authorities in Roatan which granted him the land between Michael's Rock and the lower end of the Bay. The Moores acquired properties from Elvin and built their homes in what is now called Mangrove Bight. They were joined later by the Powerys and much later by the Johnsons and the Jacksons.

On 2 October 2021, a fire at dawn grew out of control and swept through the island, engulfing some 200 structures. The Honduran military was called on to help with the rescue, dropping water onto the flames and extinguishing it. There were no casualties.

== Environment ==
=== Important Bird Area ===
The island is part of the Islas de la Bahía y Cayos Cochinos Important Bird Area (IBA), designated as such by BirdLife International because it supports significant populations of white-crowned pigeons, chimney swifts and yellow-naped amazons.

=== Climate ===
Guanaja has a borderline tropical monsoon climate (Köppen Am), very close to being a tropical rainforest climate (Af). The weather is very warm to hot and humid throughout the year, with rainfall fluctuating from moderate to very heavy depending upon the strength of the northeast trade winds and of Caribbean hurricanes.

Climate data for Guanaja
Month	Jan	Feb	Mar	Apr	May	Jun	Jul	Aug	Sep	Oct	Nov	Dec	Year
Mean daily maximum °C (°F)	28 (82)	28 (83)	30 (86)	31 (87)	31 (88)	32 (89)	31 (88)	31 (88)	32 (89)	30 (86)	29 (85)	29 (84)	30 (86)
Mean daily minimum °C (°F)	25 (77)	25 (77)	26 (78)	27 (80)	27 (81)	28 (82)	27 (81)	28 (82)	28 (82)	27 (80)	26 (78)	25 (77)	27 (80)
Average rainfall mm (inches)	220 (8.6)	120 (4.7)	81 (3.2)	58 (2.3)	69 (2.7)	150 (5.8)	260 (10.4)	180 (6.9)	150 (6.1)	450 (17.8)	420 (16.4)	360 (14)	2,520 (99.1)
Source: Weatherbase

== Demographics ==
At the time of the 2013 Honduras census, Guanaja municipality had a population of 5,445. Of these, 70.19% were Mestizo, 12.18% Black or Afro-Honduran, 9.91% White, 3.22% Indigenous (2.66% Miskito) and 4.51% others.

=== Caracoles ===
The Caracol people are an English-speaking people who have been established in Northern Honduras (specifically, the Bay Islands) since the early 19th century and are mainly of African descent with some European admixture. They are originally migrants from the English-speaking Caribbean who came to work on the construction of railroads as well as on banana plantations for the United Fruit Co. Caracol is a Spanish term that literally translates as conch, snail or shell and relates the people of the Bay Islands to their unique environment and their seafaring culture.

English is the first language of all native islanders regardless of race, and Spanish is spoken second, whereas mainland Honduras is primarily Spanish-speaking. This comes as a result of the island's past as a British colony. With the steady influx of mainland Hondurans migrating to the islands an increase in Spanish has arisen, but because of the tourism and cruise ship industry that support the islands, English continues to be the first spoken and dominant language among native island peoples. Over time the form of English spoken by the Caracol has changed. The language differs mostly in morphology but also in pronunciation and accent and, to a lesser extent, in syntax and vocabulary, from the English of the other British Caribbean colonies. Evidenced by the usage of the wide variety of old standard English terms and words that are used throughout the islands. They are similar enough to be mutually intelligible and understood throughout the entire Bay Islands. The language can also be learned, although it is not taught in the general sense, whilst the accent derived from the wide variety of expatriates living and working on the Islands from North America and Europe.

== Transportation ==
Black Rock Point Lighthouse
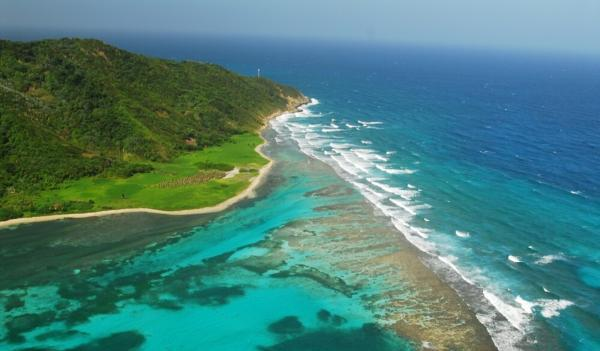
- The lighthouse is at the end of the land
- Location: Guanaja, Bay Islands Department, Honduras
- Coordinates: 16°29′53.3″N 85°49′01.8″W

Tower
- Foundation: concrete base
- Construction: steel post
- Height: 12 metres (39 ft)
- Shape: cylindrical post with light
- Markings: white and red horizontal band post
- Power source: solar power

Light
- Focal height: 22 metres (72 ft)
- Range: 19 nautical miles (35 km; 22 mi)
- Characteristic: Fl W 9s.

Transportation is sparse, and as of 2006, there were only three cars on the island, but by the end of 2011, there were roughly 40. While there is only one road, from Mangrove Bight to Savannah Bight, the most common means of transportation are boats. A channel locally known as "The Canal" allows access from the south to the north side of the island without having to go all the way around. Guanaja is served by the Guanaja Airport (GJA). As of 2011, access to Guanaja is only by air flights from the Honduran mainland town of La Ceiba and a twice-weekly ferry from Trujillo. Along with private boats and charter planes, there are now flights from Roatan to Guanaja daily. Travel between Roatan and Guanaja is now also possible by the Galaxy ferry on select days of the week.

Currently, the main transportation is limited to boats. There are some cars and small motorcycles for rent, but the road is only two miles long.

== See also ==
- List of lighthouses in Honduras
