= Great Reno Fire of 1879 =

1879 urban conflagration in Reno, Nevada

- Date: March 2, 1879
- Location: Reno, Washoe County, Nevada

Statistics
- Burned area: 50 acres (20 ha; 0.078 sq mi)

Impacts
- Deaths: 5
- Injuries: Unknown
- Structures destroyed: 350
- Cost: $810,000 (1879 USD)

Ignition
- Cause: Sparks from a stovepipe

The Great Reno Fire of 1879 was an urban conflagration that burned in Reno, Washoe County, Nevada on March 2, 1879. Fire alarms throughout the city began ringing at 5:55 am after sparks from a poorly constructed stovepipe ignited a pile of wood. The fire burned 50 acres (20 ha; 0.078 sq mi) and was extinguished by that evening. The fire killed five people, destroyed 350 structures, and incurred about $810,000 in damage.

== Background ==
The Washoe Zephyr is a routine, local wind that occurs in the Truckee Meadows. The sun warms the ground. Warm air rises from the ground, traveling west and cooling and sinking near the Sierra Nevada. This subsequently lowers the atmospheric pressure. This sinking motion creates high atmospheric pressure near the Sierra Nevada; the movement of air from high pressure to low pressure creates wind. The Truckee Meadows typically sees the strongest winds in spring.

The morning of the fire, the wind was described as so strong that "pedestrians found it difficult to walk" and "firemen on the scene brought their hoses so close to the flames that their hair was burned, but the Washoe Zephyr winds blew the water into an ineffective spray." On March 10, 1879, the Reno Evening Gazette stated the past ten days were a continuous windstorm.

== Events ==
Sparks from a poorly constructed stovepipe set a stack of wood behind the Railroad Hotel ablaze. An elderly woman was the first to notice the fire and attempted to lift a barrel of water but was unable to. She started yelling for her sons. When they arrived, they pulled the fire alarm at the firehouse. Before firefighting efforts could begin, wind–blown sparks had reached the Reno Lumber Yard across the city. The wind blew embers around the city. The winds blew the blaze into northeast Reno. Structures on ranches three miles (4.8 km) from the main fire were ignited by blowing embers. At the firestorm's peak, shingles and other debris were blown and held against buildings. Equipment was sent in from Carson City, Virginia City, Verdi, Truckee, Boca, and Bronco. The fire was extinguished before sunset. The fire burned 50 acres (20 ha).

== Effects ==
The conflagration destroyed about 350 structures, including most of the businesses in downtown Reno. Fifty families lost their homes. Damage estimates were roughly $800,000, and the Nevada Legislature utilized $10,000 to help impacted residents recover. Two or three railroad cars owned by Central Pacific Railroad were also destroyed. Five people were killed.
