= 1954 Busan Yongdusan fires =

Large fires in Busan, South Korea

The Busan Yongdusan fires, also known as the Yongdusan Park Great Fire (Korean: 용두산 공원 대화재; Hanja: 龍頭山公園大火災), was a series of two fires that happened on 10 and 26 December 1954, around Yongdusan Park, Busan, South Korea. The fires resulted in the destruction of hundreds of shanty buildings, along with the evacuation of around 7,420 refugees in total.

The 26 December fire, in particular, caused the loss of more than 3,400 historic relics, including historic portraits of kings of the Joseon dynasty (1392–1897). The relics, many of which were considered National Treasures, had been brought to the area for safekeeping during the 1950–1953 Korean War and were kept in a local warehouse owned by the Busan National Music Center. Of the 48 royal portraits kept in the warehouse, 30 were completely destroyed in the fire. The others were recovered in varying conditions, with most being heavily damaged.

== Background ==
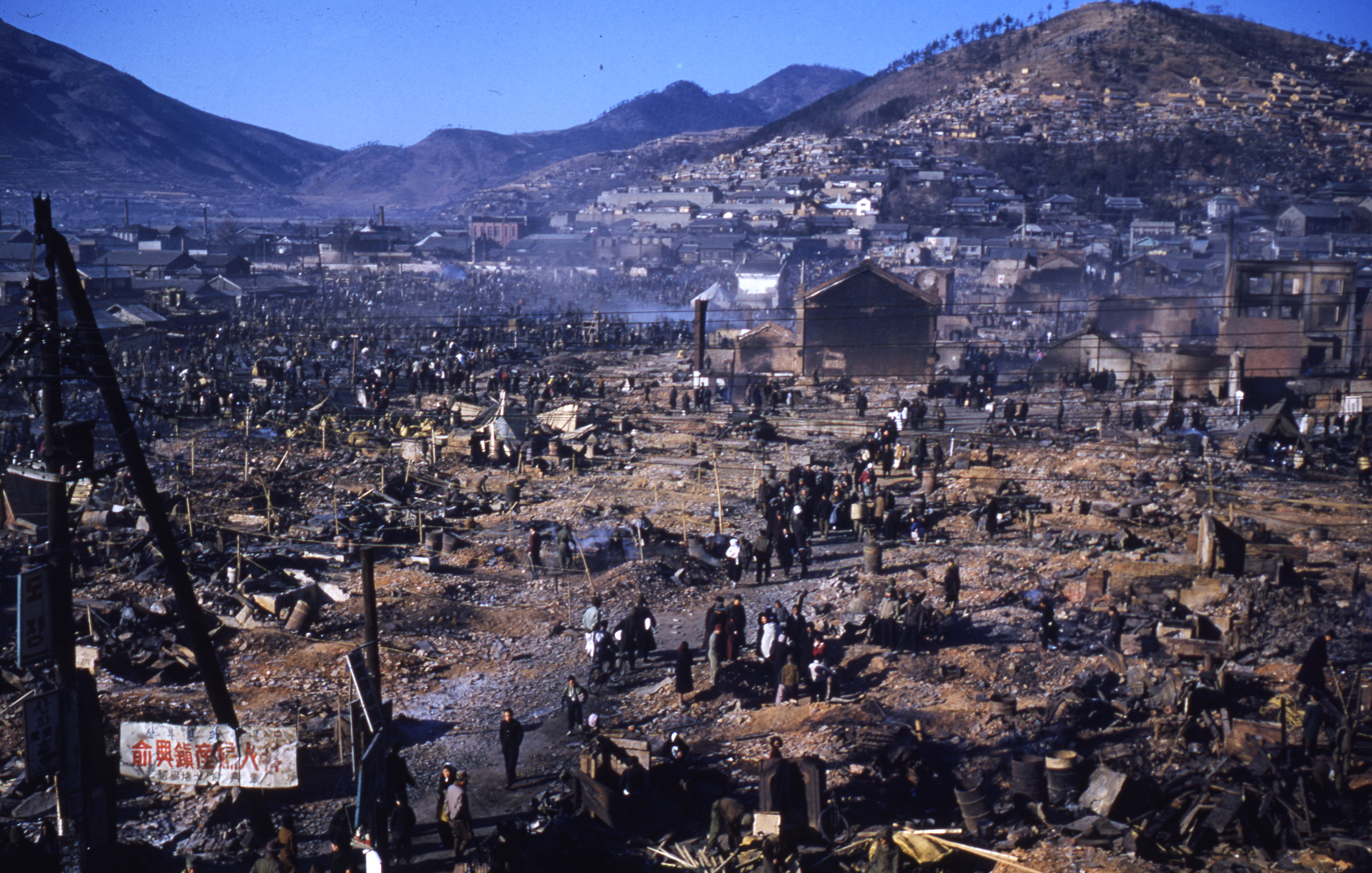
Refugees amidst the ruins of Gukje Market, after a January 1953 fire

During the Korean War, around 1 million refugees arrived in Busan. As the city was previously built to accommodate around 300,000 people, the refugees put a severe strain on the city's resources. Numerous shacks were constructed in close proximity. The shacks were often made from highly flammable materials, including plywood and cardboard boxes. Other factors also contributed to risk of fire, including poor access to water and the use of fire for keeping warm in the winter.

A number of significant fires occurred in Busan before the 1954 Yongdusan fire. For example, cases of great fires occurred on 5 December 1951, 2 January 1952, 30 January 1953, and 27 November 1953.

=== Relocation of relics ===
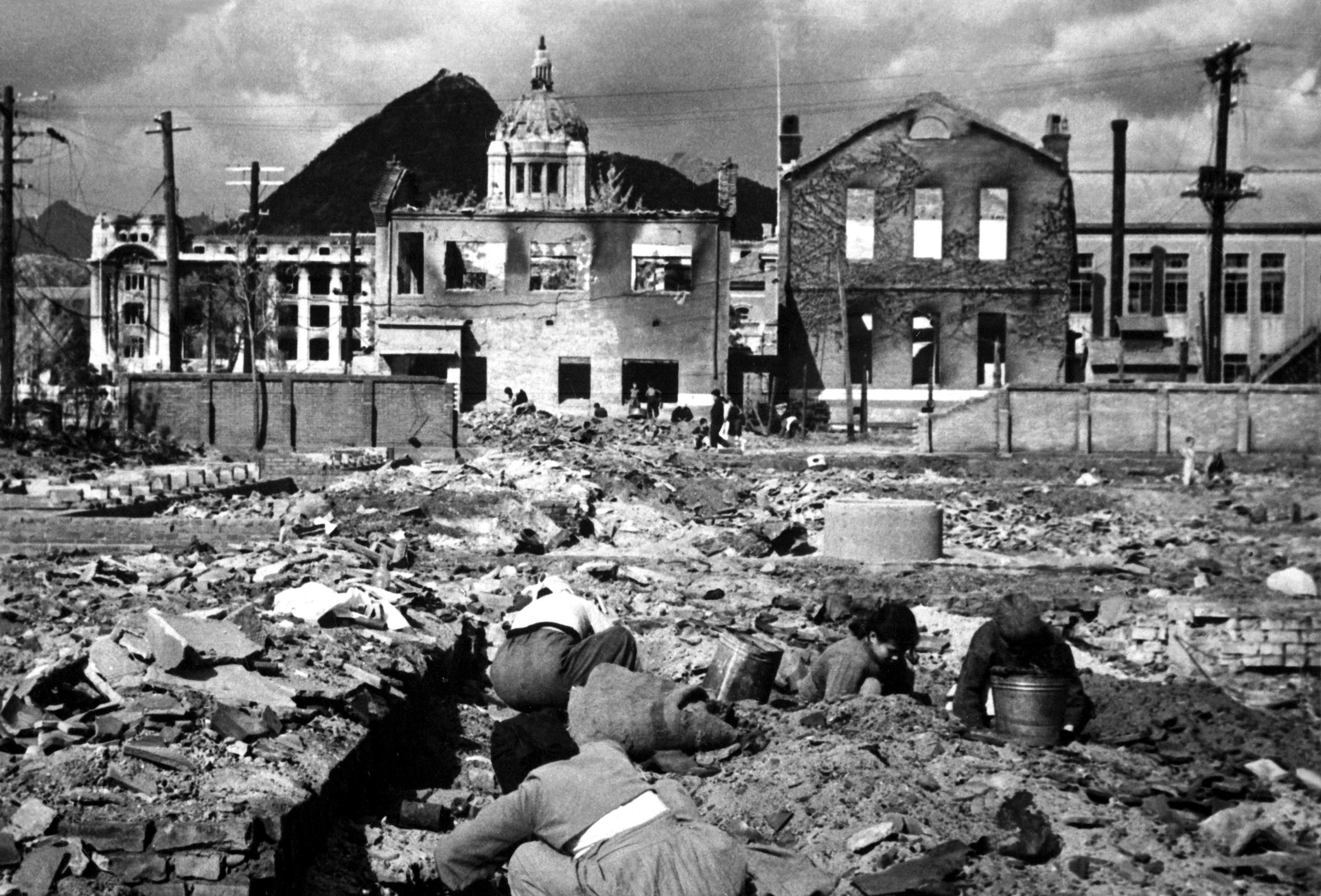
Severe damage to buildings in Seoul (1 November 1950)

On 28 September 1950, after Seoul was recaptured during the Second Battle of Seoul, the South Korean government began moving around 4,000 historical relics from the Korean royal family to a storage facility for the Busan National Music Center (부산국악원) in Donggwang-dong (near Yongdusan), Busan. Busan, which was made the provisional capital of South Korea, was further away from the border with North Korea, and thus thought to be safer for the artifacts.

Among these relics were royal portraits from the Changdeokgung Seonwonjeon, items from the National Museum of Korea, items from the Deoksugung Art Museum, volumes of the Veritable Records of the Joseon Dynasty stored at Seoul National University, the Seungjeongwon ilgi, the Records of the Border Defense Council, and the Ilseongnok. Other items included crafts and instruments.

These items were protected even through the signing of the 1953 Korean Armistice Agreement, which froze the conflict. Amidst continued uncertainty about the resilience of the ceasefire, costs of again relocating the artifacts, and the repair efforts underway in Seoul, they continued to keep the artifacts in Busan. In October 1954, National Museum of Korea director Kim Jae-won (김재원; 1909–1990) sent a letter to the Ministry of Education in which he expressed his concerns about the safety of the artifacts from fire, but little was reportedly done in response.

== 10 December fire ==
First Busan Yongdusan fire
- Shanty houses burning in the fire
- Date: 10 December 1954; 3:57 a.m. – 6:30 a.m.
- Location: Donggwang-dong, Jung District, Busan, South Korea
- Coordinates: 35°06′04.9″N 129°02′01.5″E

Impacts
- Deaths: 4
- Evacuated: 6,000
- Structures destroyed: 448 buildings, 435 shacks

On 10 December 1954, a fire began in Donggwang-dong, Jung District, at 3:57 a.m., when Yun Dong-geun (윤동근; 尹東根), a local clothing vendor, mishandled a brick of honeycomb briquette. The fire destroyed around 448 buildings and 435 shacks in the Yongdusan area. Four people died, and 6,000 people were affected by the fire. The fire completely burned down a local church, a hotel, a YMCA center, and a provisional facility belonging to Donggwang Elementary School. The fire went out by 6:30 a.m.

In 2006, several photos of the fire were revealed in an exhibition in Busan, along with historic photos of refugees and shanty houses. The photos, which were originally taken by a U.S. soldier, were purchased by Kim Han-geun, director of the Busan Buddhist History Research Institute (부산불교역사연구소), from a U.S. auction.

== 26 December fire ==
Second Busan Yongdusan fire
- Date: 26 December 1954; 6:20 a.m. – 11:00 a.m.
- Location: Donggwang-dong, Jung District, Busan, South Korea
- Coordinates: 35°05′58.7″N 129°01′55.4″E

Impacts
- Deaths: 1
- Evacuated: 1,420
- Structures destroyed: 298 shacks
- Cost: 3.97 million hwan

At around 6:20 a.m. on 26 December 1954, a fire began spreading from an unattended candle lit by a housekeeper on the second floor of a shanty building in Yongdusan. The fire destroyed 298 shanty buildings, affecting 1,420 people and killing one person. It was extinguished by 11 a.m. After these two fires, most of the shacks on Yongdusan were destroyed.

After the 26 December fire, a fact-finding team was dispatched to Busan. On 6 January 1955, they announced that of about 4,000 relics, more than 3,400 were lost. Around 546 relics in varying conditions were salvaged. Of the 48 royal portraits, 30 were lost completely, and 18 were recovered in varying conditions. On 8 January 1955, Minister of Home Affairs Baek Han-seong denied the reports, claiming that only 400 relics, all of which were not national treasures, were lost in the fire. He further assured that nobody would be held responsible for the fires.

It is still not known with certainty everything that was lost in the fire; there was a list documenting the items in the collection, but it was destroyed in an arson incident on 6 June 1960, at Changdeokgung, and no copies of it had been made. Some portraits were recovered in such poor condition that it is uncertain who they are of.

== Legacy ==
The fires are now considered among Busan's largest. The loss of the cultural relics has since been evaluated as a tragedy. While other portraits had been previously lost due to Korea's wars, such as the 1592–1598 Japanese invasions of Korea, the 1627 Later Jin invasion of Joseon, the 1636–1637 Qing invasion of Joseon, many had still survived until the time of the fire. At the end of the Joseon dynasty, among the 19 Joseon monarchs whose royal portraits were created, the portraits of Taejo, Sejo, Sukjong, Yeongjo, Jeongjo, Sunjo, Heonjong, Cheoljong, Gojong, and Sunjong were left. After the fire, only the royal portraits of four monarchs: Taejo, Sejo, Yeongjo, and Cheoljong, have survived with recognizable faces. (Note: Other than Gojong and Sunjong, whose portraits also remain along with their photographs)

Royal portraits of Joseon that were damaged in the fire
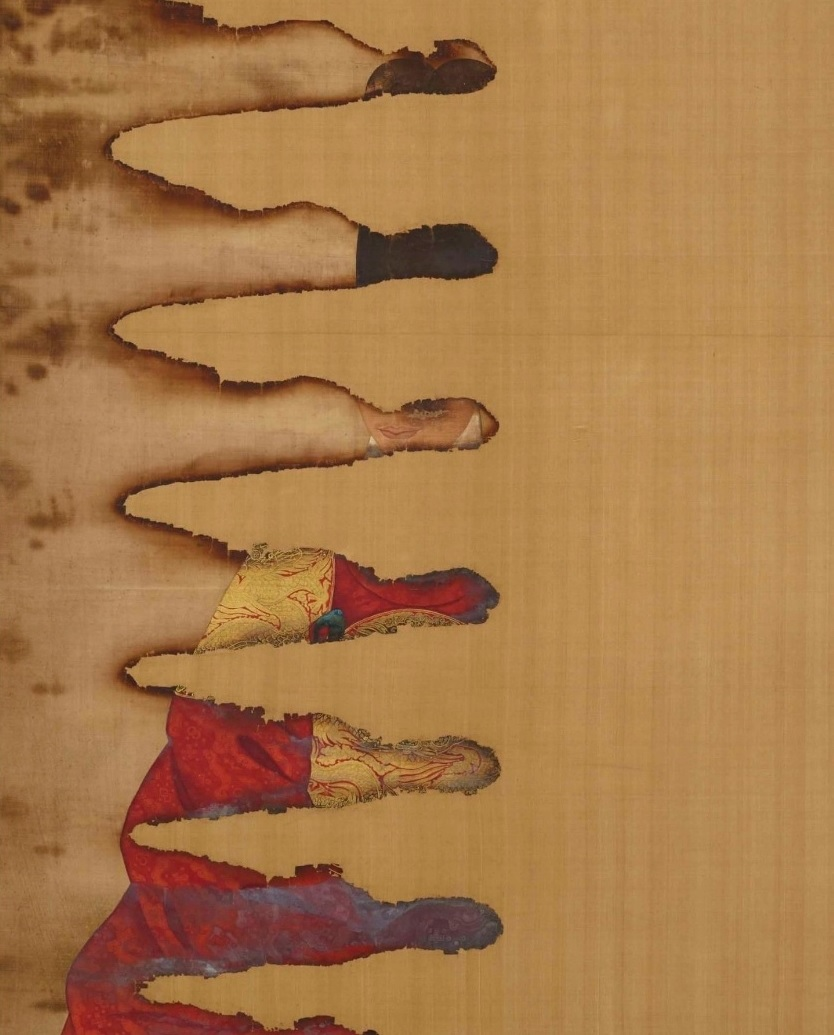
Portrait of Sunjo of Joseon, 1808

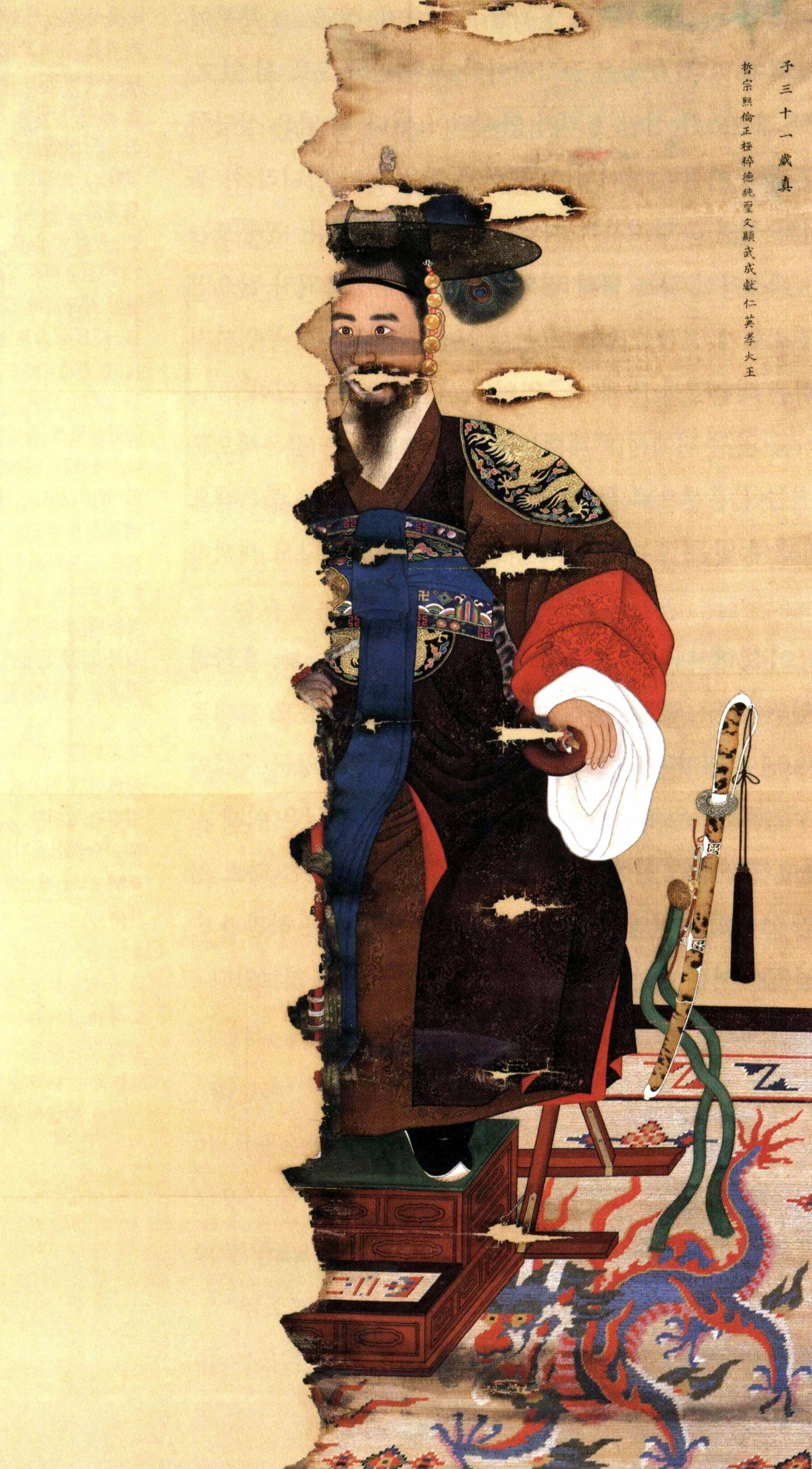
Portrait of Cheoljong of Joseon, 1861

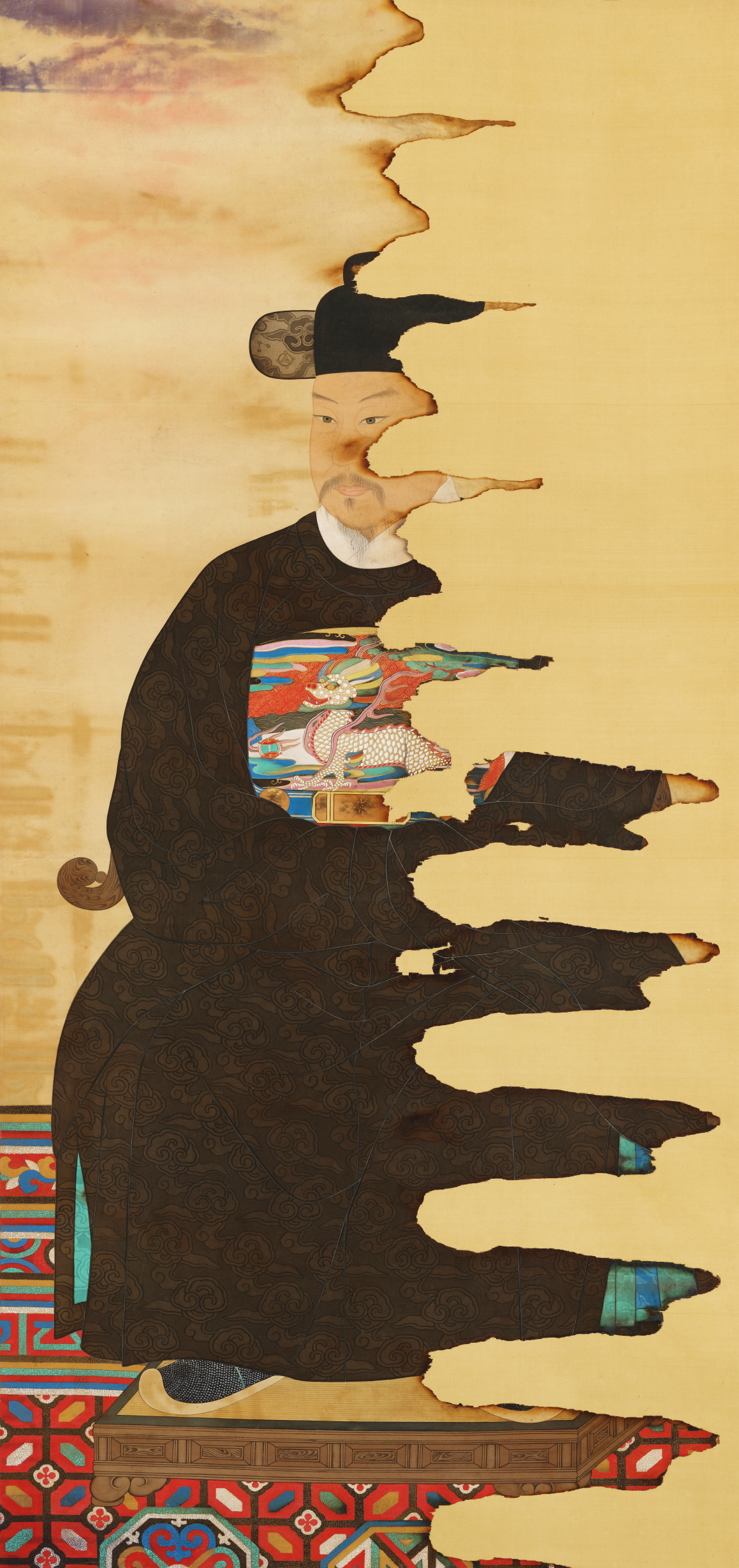
Portrait of Wonjong of Joseon, 1935

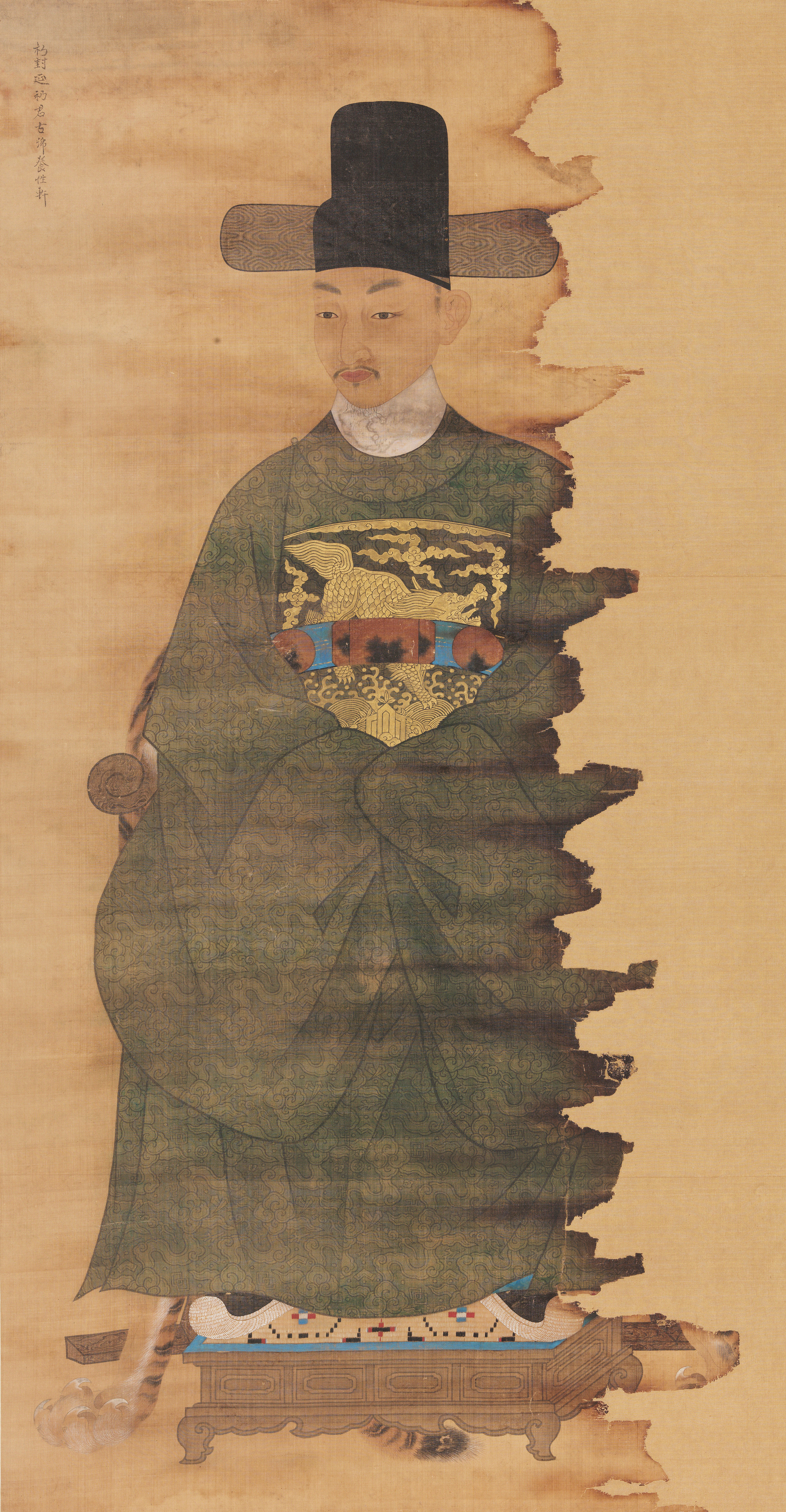
Portrait of Prince Yeoning, 1714

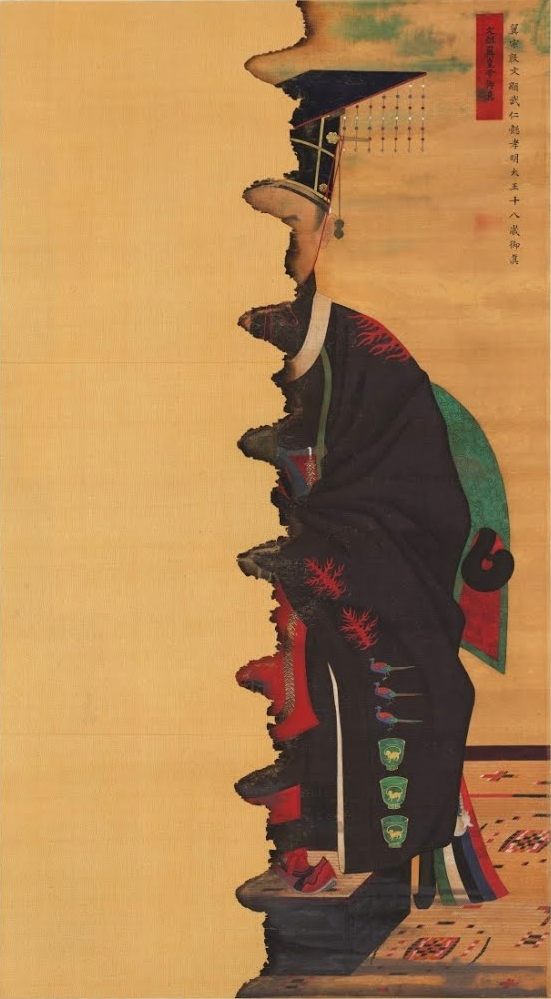
Portrait of Crown Prince Hyomyeong, 1826

Sejo of Joseon's face was originally deemed lost when two of his last remaining portraits were destroyed in the fire. However, in November 2016, a sketch of his portrait "miraculously" emerged in an auction, which was subsequently purchased by the National Palace Museum of Korea. The sketch was drawn by painter Kim Eun-ho when he was commissioned to create a portrait of Sejo in 1935.

In 1955, a stone tablet was installed in Yongdusan Park with an inscription of a bujeok. The bujeok was in the form of four Chinese characters meaning "water" (水) surrounding "fire" (火), with text written below which described a yearning for protection from fire.

== See also ==
- 1953 Gukje Market fire
- 1953 Busan station fire
