= 1426 Hanyang fires =

1426 fires in Hanyang, Joseon

In 1426, two large fires broke out on consecutive days in Hanyang (now Seoul), the capital of Joseon. The fires destroyed 114 rooms of a royal villa and approximately 2,400 houses. This was approximately 15% of the total homes in the city (16,921). Casualties included 9 men and 23 women; fatalities are not mentioned in records of the incident. The second fire destroyed 200 of houses of that total figure. The monarch at the time, Sejong, was outside the city on a hunting trip. He rushed back after hearing the news and began relief efforts.

At the time, traditional houses (hanok) had thatched roofs, which were highly flammable. The government had attempted to convert many thatched-roof buildings into tile roofs beginning in 1406. However, the high price of the tiles made them inaccessible to common people. After the 1426 fires, the government made an effort to distribute the tiles for lower cost or for free to many houses. Sejong also dictated instructions for urban design to deter fires. Instructions included building walls between structures in the palaces, making roads wider, tearing down buildings that were built too close to each other, and adding a gap between every five buildings. He also established a fire watch, which would observe the city from a watch tower. If they observed a fire, a bell would be rung to notify the public.
