= Krokstadelva =

Town in Drammen Municipality, Norway

Coordinates: 59°45′29″N 10°0′21″E

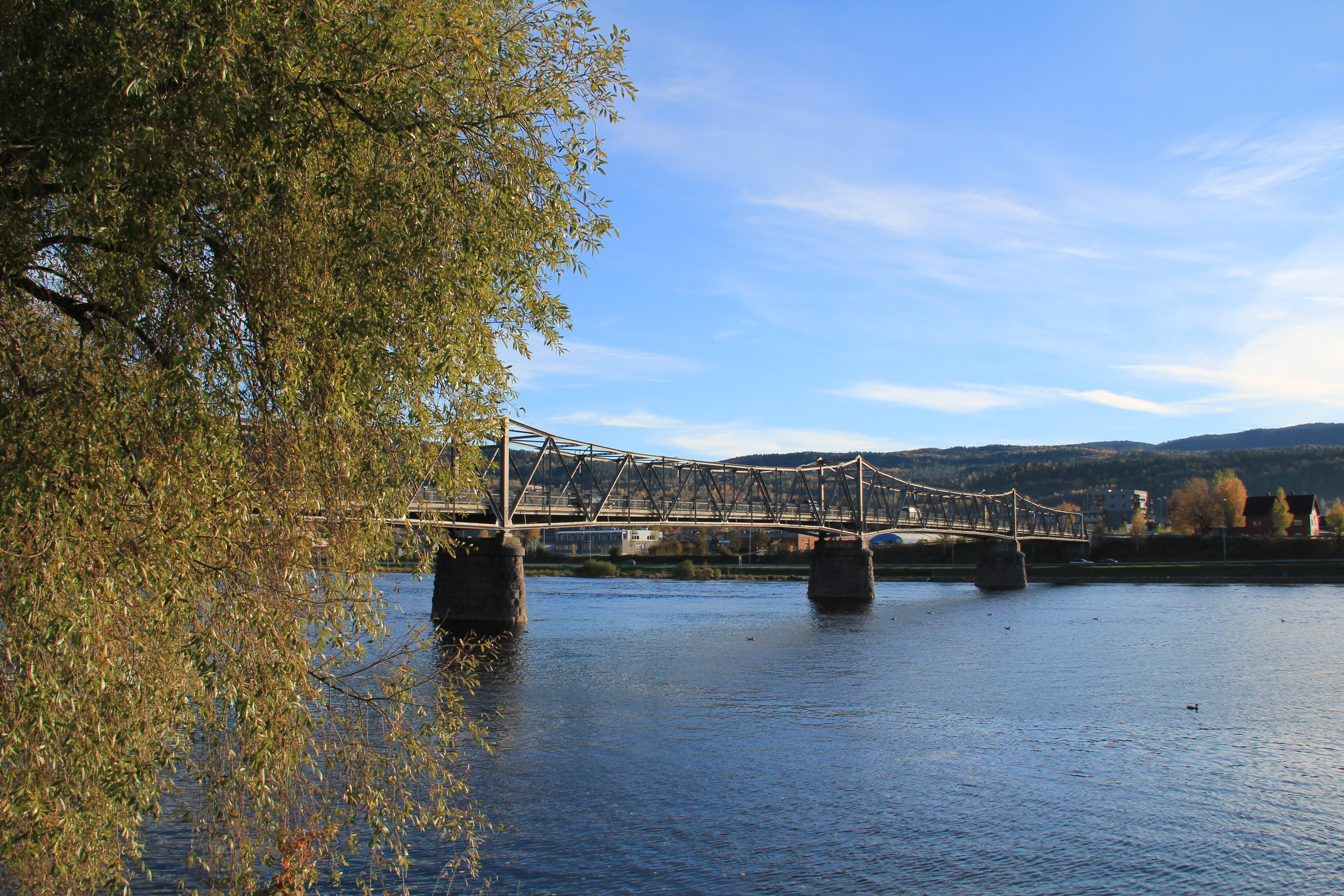
Mjøndalsbrua crosses over Drammenselva connecting Krokstadelva with Mjøndalen

Krokstadelva is a town in Drammen municipality, part of the Buskerud county in Norway. It is situated north of the Drammenselva river and opposite Mjøndalen.

== History ==
The name Krokstadelva comes from the farm name Krokstad ("a Krokstadum"), where the first part is possibly the rare male name Krok ("Krókr").

On the mountainside a fortification is present, supposed to defend the area against a possible Swedish invasion in connection with the dissolution of the union in 1905.

From 17 July 2026, a large fire ran through the hilly neighbourhood. More than 100 homes were destroyed, and at least 400 people were severely affected.

== Industry and commerce ==
Historically Krokstadelva was known for its industry; including paper & pulp production, forestry, technical-chemical manufacturing and apparel production. Today much of this industry has been phased out, and the local commerce has been given a boost in a large shopping mall located close to the town center; Alti Buskerud, formerly Buskerud Storsenter and Spareland. The shopping mall is owned by CityCon, and has around 70 stores and 1200 parking spots.

== Education ==
The town has four public schools, two primary schools (1st–7th grade) and two secondary schools (8th–10th grade). The largest primary school is Krokstad skole with about 540 students and the largest secondary school is Eknes skole with about 330 students. The Nedre Eiker Municipal Music school is also located in Krokstadelva, where about 105 students are engaged in extracurricular music education. There are two public preschools in Krokstadelva, with a total capacity of 165 children. The town also has seven private preschools.

== Culture and sports activities ==
Krokstadelva features a combined sports hall and public indoor swimming pool, situated next to Eknes skole. The local sports association is IF Birkebeineren (IBK) which primarily focuses on football, crosscountry skiing, cycling and tennis. The town also has a judo club, and there is ample opportunity for hiking, crosscountry running and crosscountry skiing in the forest areas adjacent to the town. There was previously a gymnasticsclub in IF Birkebeineren
