= Krokstadelva fire =

2026 fire in Drammen, Norway

- Part of the 2026 wildfire season
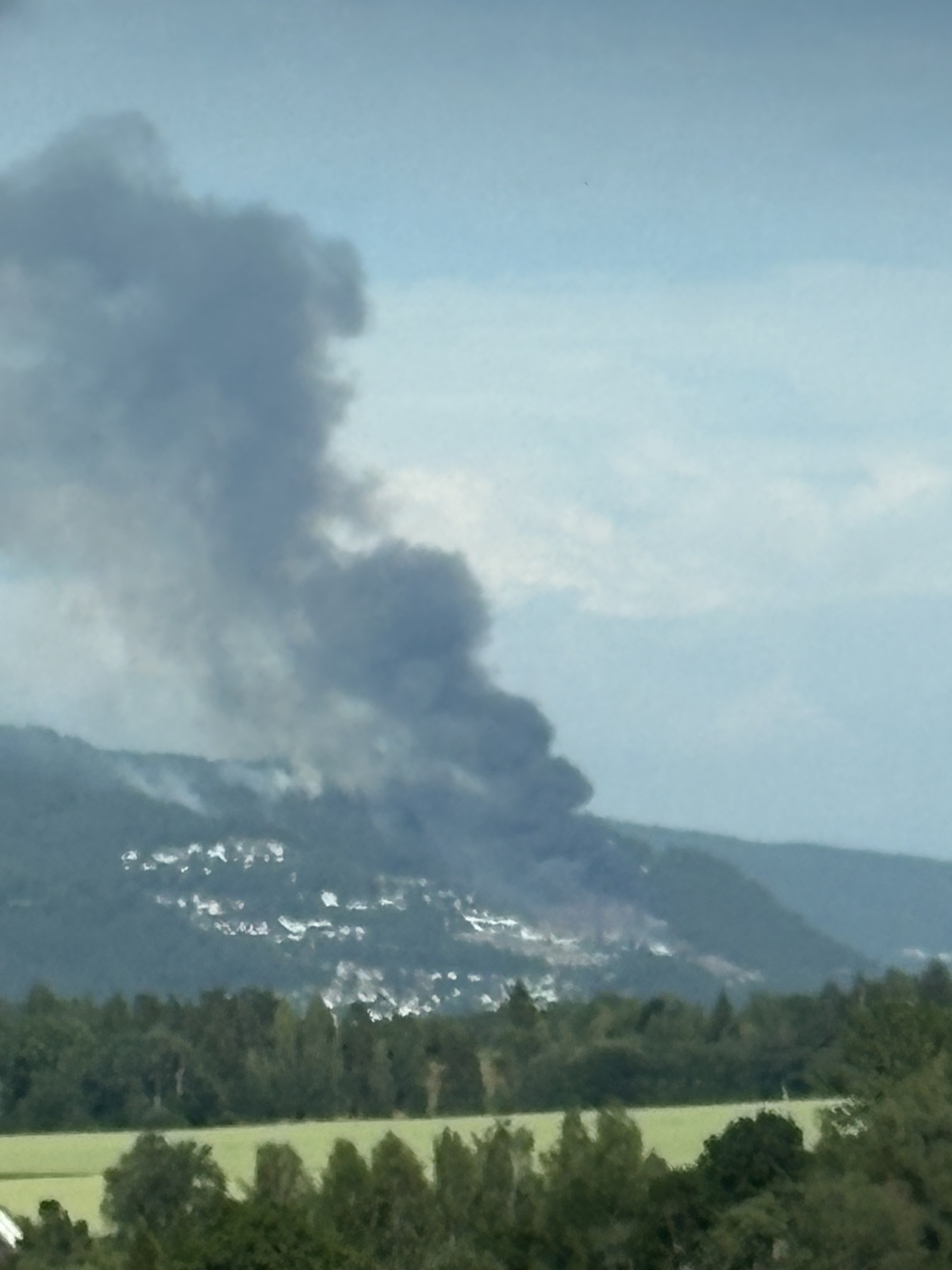
- The fire seen from Vestfossen two hours after it broke out
- Date: 17 July – 21 July 2026 (CEST)
- Location: Krokstadelva, Norway
- Coordinates: 59°45′38″N 10°2′21″E

Impacts
- Injuries: 11 reported
- Evacuated: 400+
- Structures destroyed: 50+
- Cost: at least 1 billion NOK

The Krokstadelva fire was a 2026 residential and wildfire in eastern Norway, one of the largest residential fires in modern Norwegian history. The fire broke out on the afternoon on 17 July 2026 in Krokstadelva, Drammen, Buskerud, Norway, and spread quickly due to dry vegetation, high winds and warm temperatures. Within hours of the fire being discovered, several hundred people were evacuated, and more than one hundred residential units were reported as completely destroyed by nighttime. The fire was brought under control four days later.

== Timeline ==
The fire was first reported by the authorities at 15:39 local time, four minutes after the first call from a resident. Witness statements and video from a nearby surveillance camera show the fire starting around 15:30 with smoke visible at 15:32. Despite a fast response from the local fire department, the fire developed during quickly during the afternoon to affect many residents of the Stenseth housing estate. Due to a long period of warm weather without rainfall, the vegetation was extremely dry, which, along with high winds, caused the fire to spread quickly. By 18:55, the fire had spread uphill to a larger area covering more than 100 residential units, all of which were completely burnt to the ground. At 22:00, the fire was still out of control, flaring up in different places at different times, with fire departments from three counties and eight municipalities taking part, including six helicopters. The fire also spread to a nearby forest, where it was still burning the following day. By early 21 July, the fire was brought under control. Authorities stated that they expect the extinguishing work to continue for at least ten days, with smoldering still being a big issue.

While some people were reported missing soon after the fire broke out, everyone was accounted for by 18:55, and there were no reported fatalities. By 19 July, at least eleven people were listed as injured, none of which were life-threatening. One firefighter suffered from burn injuries, and eight police officers and three civilian volunteers suffered smoke inhalation.

On 21 July, police indicated that they had been questioning a man identified as a suspect in the fire, stating that while the exact cause of the fire was still unknown it appeared to be accidental.

Initial reports have estimated the damages to exceed 1 billion kr (US$100 million). It is the worst fire disaster in Norway since the 2014 Lærdal fire and reportedly the largest residential fire in modern Norwegian history.

== Reactions ==
On the eve of the fire breaking out, Prime Minister Jonas Gahr Støre stated that he had "deep sympathy for those who have been evacuated, and all who have lost their houses and homes in the fire". Haakon, Crown Prince of Norway, visited the area on 19 July and described the experience as "upsetting" and "very difficult". Prime Minister Støre later visited the area on 21 July.
