= Great Bakersfield Fire of 1889 =

Conflagration in Bakersfield, California

Coordinates: 35°22′37″N 119°1′8″W

- Date: July 7, 1889
- Location: Bakersfield, California
- Outcome: 196 buildings destroyed, $1 million property damage, 1,500 homeless Marked the transition from a frontier town to a metropolitan city.
- Deaths: 1

The Great Bakersfield Fire of 1889 was a conflagration in Bakersfield, California. The fire burned for three hours and destroyed most of the town (later reincorporated as a city). In total, 196 buildings were destroyed, one man killed, and 1,500 people rendered homeless. The fire marked the transition of Bakersfield from a frontier town to a metropolitan city.

Prior to the fire, Bakersfield could best be described as a frontier town. Most buildings were constructed from wood in a low density configuration. Buildings were also set back from the sidewalks. The town did have a network of fire hydrants. Water was delivered by Scribner's Water Tower.

== The Great Fire ==
The fire started on July 7, 1889. Accounts vary as to its origin, however, the best-supported view was that it began in Mrs. N. E. Kelesy's residence near the intersection of 20th Street and Chester Avenue. She was preparing Sunday dinner, which was an all day affair. Apparently, gas fumes from the stove caught fire and then caught the house on fire. Smoke was spotted at 9:00 am, and firefighters were quickly dispatched.

At that point, the fire was too large for a single hose connected to a single fire hydrant to handle. More men were dispatched, and another connection was made at a neighboring hydrant. It was at this point that a horrific discovery was made. There was not enough water pressure in the line to deliver water to the fire.

The fire jumped to the neighboring undertakers building. Since the town's buildings were mostly constructed from wood, the fire quickly jumped from building to building. The town's fire engine finally arrived, but it took 20 minutes for enough steam pressure to build for operation. At that point, the fire was large enough that little could be done to stop it.

When the fire reached the Southern Hotel, it was hot enough that the solder used in the indoor plumbing was liquefied. The updraft created by the fire transported the solder into the air, and it rained on the streets below. Later, the fire jumped to Scribner's Water Tower at a location which firefighters could not reach it. However, the structure was saved when Will Houghton leaned out a neighboring window and threw a bucket of water on it. In the Kern Valley Bank, a bathtub filled with water was used to attempt to save that building, but the effort failed. After three hours, the fire was extinguished.

== The Aftermath ==
The results of the fire were devastating. Fifteen city blocks were destroyed which was most of the city. In total: 147 businesses, 44 homes, and 5 hotels were destroyed (a total of 196 buildings). One man was killed in the fire, and 1,500 people were homeless. Property damage was estimated at an even $1 million. The only two structures to survive in the central business district were Scribner's Water Tower and St. Paul's Episcopal Church.

The local newspapers were destroyed, however, George Wear (who owned the Gazette) saved a hand press. With that, news about the fire was published. The next day, food began to arrive from neighboring ranches. The water tower would continue to provide drinking water. Haggin and Carr brought supplies from their store in Belleview Ranch, and businessmen from neighboring Sumner also assisted. Later money and clothing began to arrive. Tehachapi even donated $74.50 (about $2,422 in 2023 dollars) to assist. Later, assistance began to arrive from Sacramento, Los Angeles, San Francisco, and Fresno. However, by that point, rebuilding efforts were well underway.

== Reconstruction ==
After the fire, the Fresno Expositor predicted that the citizens of Bakersfield would not rebuild, and simply drift away. The prediction was understandable. The town did not have direct rail access. The Southern Pacific Railroad was constructed to the east, through Sumner. With the importance of the railroad, it was believable that Sumner would become the dominant town.

The city leaders would act in a completely opposite direction than the Fresno newspaper predicted. Instead of moving away, they started planning a town three or four times bigger than the one which was destroyed. In 1890, the town had a population of 2,626, but the new town was planned to support a population of 10,000 - 15,000 people.

With this attitude, most of the buildings were rebuilt larger and grander than the previous. Most were constructed out of brick with an ornate and decorative style. The look of the town had been transformed from a frontier style, to a metropolitan style. The finest was the Southern Hotel, which cost $110,000 (over $3.25 Million in 2023 dollars) to construct. The hotel was three stories tall and contained 84 rooms. All of the rooms were equipped with hot and cold running water and gas. Designed for a city 10 times the size of Bakersfield, it was considered a rival to the finest hotels in San Francisco.

The city leaders planned for a population of 10,000-15,000 people. By the 1900 census, the city had grown to 4,836, an 84% increase. With the construction of the San Francisco and San Joaquin Valley Railroad through Bakersfield in 1898, and the discovery of oil in 1899, Bakersfield grew to a population of 12,727 in the 1910 census (a 163% increase). By comparison, in the 2010 census, Bakersfield had a population of 347,483.
