= List of fires =

List of notable fires

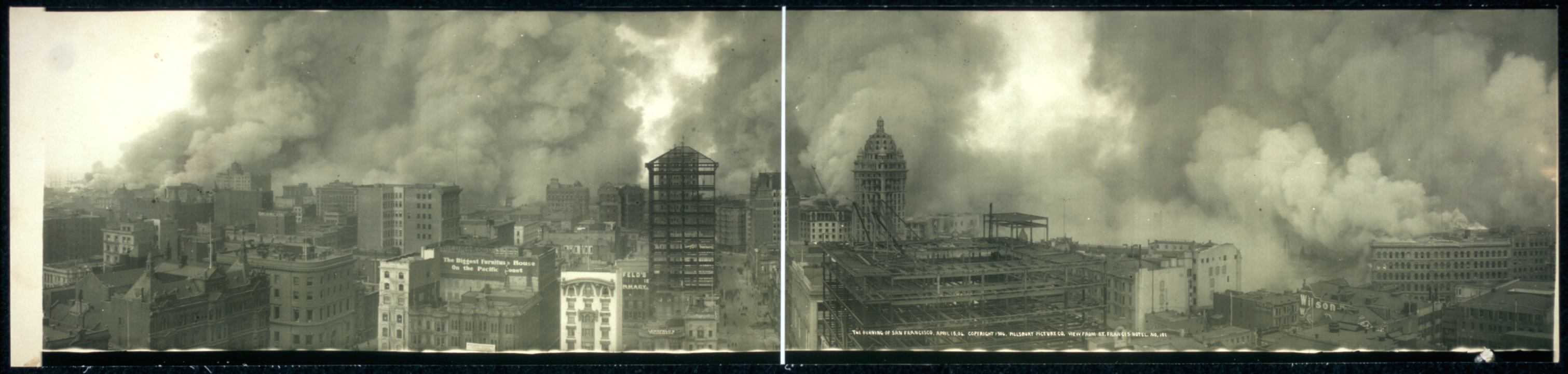
Not in history has a modern imperial city been so completely destroyed. San Francisco is gone. Jack London after the 1906 San Francisco earthquake and fire

This article is a list of notable fires.

== Town and city fires ==
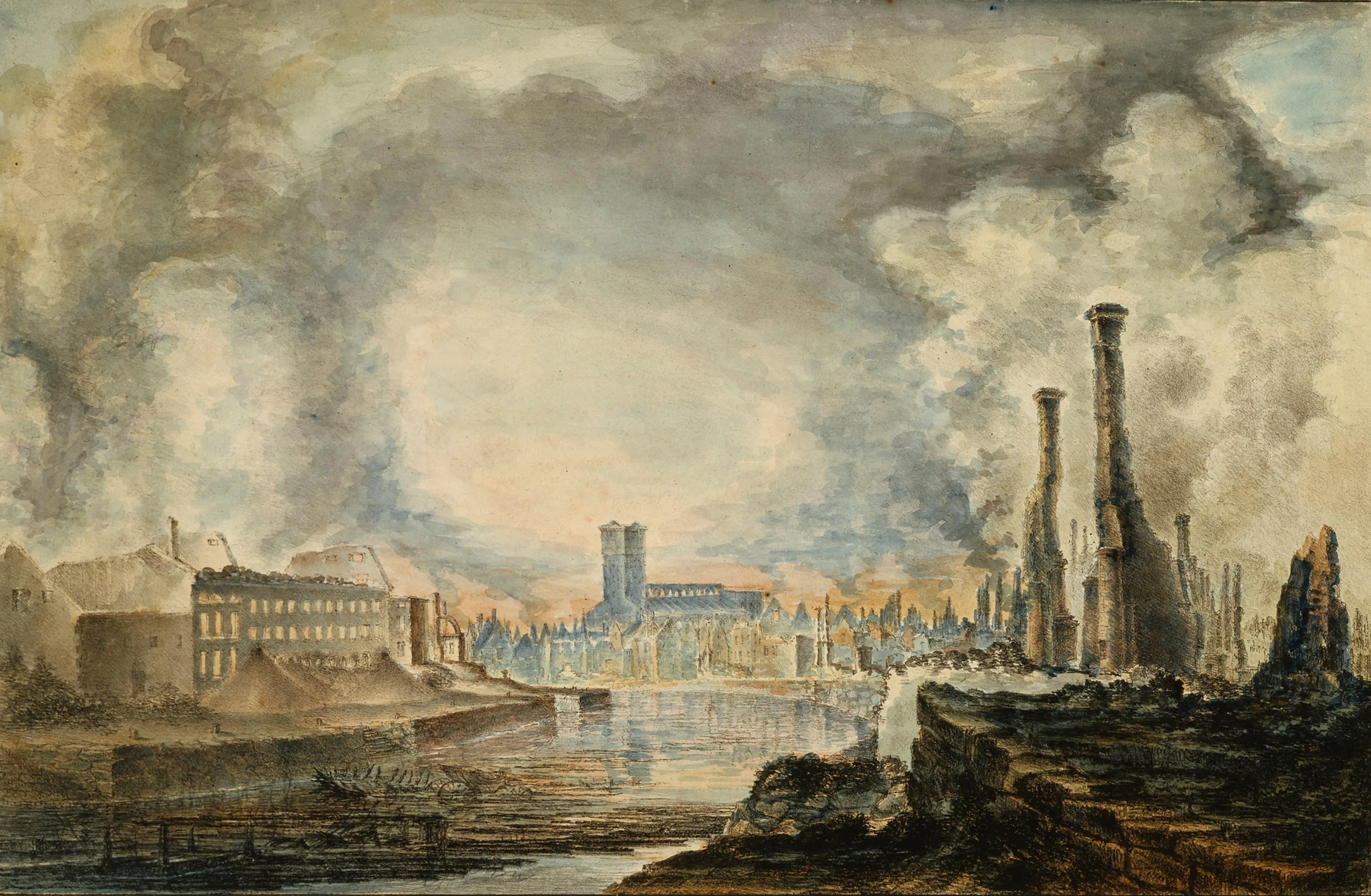
Painting of the Cathedral and the Academy building after the Great Fire of Turku, by Gustaf Wilhelm Finnberg, 1827

== Mining fires ==
This is a list of fires caused by mining: human-made structures to extract minerals, ores, rocks, petroleum, natural gas, etc. This list includes oil and gas drilling fires.

Date	Location	Dead/injured	Details	References
1884 to present	New Straitsville, Ohio		Coal mine fire ignited by striking miners	World's Greatest Mine Fire
31 May 1892	Příbram, now in the Czech Republic	319 killed, injured unknown.	Marie iron mine disaster	
7 September 1895	Osceola Township, Houghton County, Michigan	30 killed, injured unknown.	Osceola copper mine caught fire	
7 April 1911	Colliery, Throop, Pennsylvania	72 killed, injured unknown.	Fire at the Prince-Pancoast, leaving 72 dead by suffocation	
1915 to present	Luzerne County, Pennsylvania		Laurel Run mine fire ignited when a carbide lamp set fire to a timber support	
1956	Belgium	262 killed, injured unknown.	Marcinelle mining disaster killed 262 people from 12 nations	
1962	Algeria		Devil's Cigarette Lighter fire in a gas field, lasted almost 6 months before doused with explosives	
1962 to present	Pennsylvania		Centralia Mine Fire, rendering the town uninhabitable	
1967 to present	Kukruse, Estonia		A continuously burning gangue mound at the Kukruse mine	
1971 to present	Derweze, Ahal Province, Turkmenistan		Darvaza gas crater fire in a natural gas field	
morning of 2 May 1972	Kellogg, Idaho	91 killed, injured unknown.	Fire broke out in the Sunshine Mine, on the morning of 2 May; 91 workers died from smoke inhalation or carbon monoxide poisoning	
16 September 1986	Kinross, Transvaal, South Africa	177 killed, 235 injured.	Kinross mining disaster fire in a gold mine owned by the General Mining Union Corporation	
6 July 1988	North Sea	167 killed, injured unknown.	Piper Alpha oil platform disaster	
1991	State of Kuwait		Kuwaiti oil fires following the Gulf War	
2010	Gulf of Mexico	11 killed, 17 injured.	Explosion and fire on the Deepwater Horizon Mobile offshore drilling unit	
2010	New Zealand	29 killed, injured unknown.	Pike River Mine disaster in New Zealand; a series of three explosions in the mine was followed by a fourth which set fire to the coal. 29 miners and contractors perished.	
4 December 2015	Caspian Sea	12 killed, 18 missing, injured unknown.	Gunashli Platform No.10 fire broke out on the offshore oil and gas platform in the Azerbaijani section of the Caspian Sea; 12 confirmed deaths, 18 missing.	

== Forest and countryside fires ==
Date	Location	Dead/injured	Details	References
8 October 1871	Michigan	More than 200 killed, injured unknown.	A series of fires across the state, the most severe of which was the Port Huron Fire. The combined Michigan fires killed over 200 people and burned about 1.2 million acres. Occurred on the same day as the Great Chicago Fire and the Peshtigo fire.	Great Michigan Fire
8 October 1871	Wisconsin	1,500–2,500 killed, injured unknown.	Deadliest wildfire in world history. Death toll can only be estimated because entire towns with all town records were incinerated. Burned over 1.2 million acres. Occurred on the same day as the Great Chicago Fire and the Great Michigan Fire.	Peshtigo Fire
1910	North Idaho and Western Montana	87 killed, injured unknown.	The largest Fire in U.S. history. It burned an area the size of Connecticut (3,000,000 acres [12,000 km^{2}]), killing 87 people, including 78 firefighters.	Great Fire of 1910
1911	Ontario	73–200 killed, injured unknown.		Great Porcupine Fire
29 July 1916	Ontario	223 killed, injured unknown.	Six towns destroyed, two more damaged.	Matheson Fire
12 October 1918	Minnesota	453 killed, injured unknown.		1918 Cloquet Fire
1921		35 killed, injured unknown.		1921 Mari wildfires
1922	Northern Ontario		Several towns destroyed including 90% of the city of Haileybury, Ontario.	Great Fire of 1922
1933	Los Angeles, California	29 killed, injured unknown.	Griffith Park fire in Los Angeles, California, killed 29 firefighters on 3 October.	1933 Griffith Park fire
1933	Tillamook Burn, Oregon			
1936	Kursha-2, Russia	1200 killed.		
1936	Bandon, Oregon	11 killed.	Bandon's entire commercial district was destroyed, total loss stated at the time was $3 million, with 11 fatalities.	
1937	Shoshone National Forest, Wyoming	15 killed.	Killed 15 firefighters on 21 August.	Blackwater Fire of 1937
1939	Victoria, Australia	71 killed.		Black Friday bushfires
1949	Landes Forest, France	82 killed.	256,000 acres (1,040 km^{2}) lost.	1949 Landes forest fire
1949	Helena National Forest, Montana, U.S.	13 killed.		Mann Gulch Fire
1953	Mendocino National Forest near Willows, California	15 killed.	Set by an arsonist named Stanford Pattan. Killed 15 firefighters on 9 July.	Rattlesnake Fire
1963	Paraná	110 killed.	20,000 square kilometres destroyed, killing at least 110, with 5,000 houses burned in September.	
1966	Serra de Sintra, outside of Lisbon, Portugal	26 killed.	26.6 square kilometres (6,600 acres) destroyed, killing 26.	
1967	Tasmania, Australia	62 killed, more than 900 injured.		1967 Tasmanian fires
1971	Kure, western Honshū, Japan	18 killed.	18 firefighters killed on 27 April.	
1975	Northern Germany	7 killed.	80 square kilometres destroyed, 7 fatalities including 5 firefighters killed on 10 August.	Fire on the Lüneburg Heath
1983	South Australia and Victoria	75 killed, more than 2600 injured.	Killed 75 people and injured more than 2600 others.	Ash Wednesday bushfires
1987	People's Republic of China		Burned for a month.	1987 Black Dragon fire
1988	Yellowstone National Park, U.S.		Largest, most expensive wildfire in the history of the National Park Service, at the world's first national park.	Yellowstone fires of 1988
1991	Oakland, California, U.S.	25 killed, 150 injured.	Killed 25 people and injured 150 others.	Oakland firestorm of 1991
1994	Isabela Island		12 km² lost in April.	
1994	Storm King Mountain near Glenwood Springs, Colorado	14 killed.	Killed fourteen firefighters on 6 July.	South Canyon Fire
2002	Oregon		The largest Wildfire in the recorded history of Oregon.	Biscuit Fire
2003	Australian Capital Territory	4 killed, 435 injured.		Canberra bushfires
2003	Southern California		Destroyed over 550 homes and many acres of land.	Cedar Fire
2003	British Columbia			2003 Okanagan Mountain Park fire
2005	South Australia	9 killed, at least 113 injured.	9 killed, at least 113 injured and 79 houses destroyed.	Eyre Peninsula bushfire
2006	Pilliga forest		Burned out 740 km² on just its first day.	
2007	California, U.S.			October 2007 California wildfires
2008	California, U.S.		Second costliest in US history to extinguish.	Summer 2008 California wildfires
2009	Victoria, Australia	180 killed, roughly 500 injured.	In February, at the end of the early 2009 southeastern Australia heat wave, bushfires swept through the Australian state of Victoria killing 180 people, injuring around 500, destroying at least 2029 homes.	Black Saturday bushfires
2010	Russia	54 killed.	2000 buildings, 8000 km² destroyed, 54 killed.	2010 Russian wildfires
2010	Israel	44 killed.		2010 Mount Carmel forest fire
2011	Parts of Northern Ireland and the Republic of Ireland		Destroyed many parks and forests.	
2011	Texas, U.S.		Claimed almost 4 million acres in over 21,000 fires. Approximately 7,000 homes were lost and approximately 50,000 homes in direct danger were saved by fire departments across the state.	Summer fire outbreak across Texas
2011	Bastrop, Texas	2 killed.	Two wildfires burn in Bastrop, Texas; 2 people killed, 34,000 acres burned, over 1000 houses and other structures destroyed.	
2011	Swinley Forest, UK		12 fire services attended from various counties to extinguish this forest fire.	
2015	Mount Lofty Ranges, South Australia		Destroyed 12,500 hectares (31,000 acres) of native forest, farmland, vineyards and 27 houses, with no human fatalities.	Sampson Flat bushfires
2016	Portugal			2016 Portugal Wildfires
2017	Ireland		Between 30 and 40 gorse fires raged across Ireland between late April and early May. Cloosh Valley saw the worst of these fires with 1,500 hectares (5.8 sq mi) of forest damaged.	
2017	Portugal	At least 66 killed, at least 204 injured.		June 2017 Portugal Wildfires
2017	Oregon's Deschutes National Forest, Columbia River Gorge National Scenic Area, and the Willamette National Forest		Fires consumed hundreds of thousands of acres of Oregon's Deschutes National Forest, Columbia River Gorge National Scenic Area, and the Willamette National Forest during August and September, causing evacuations and road closures. Fires included the Chetco Bar Fire and the Eagle Creek Fire, which also spread into Skamania County, Washington, United States.	
2018	California, U.S.	85 killed.	Began November 8, 2018; caused 85 deaths and destroyed 18,804 structures.	Camp Fire
2018	California, U.S.	3 killed.	Broke out on the same day as the Camp Fire. Resulted in three deaths and the destruction of 1,643 structures, among them, the homes of notable celebrities.	Woolsey Fire
2019	Nelson and Tasman District, New Zealand		Two wildfires, 20 kilometres apart in Nelson and Tasman District, New Zealand, started on 5 February 2019. The Pigeon Valley fire was described as New Zealand's largest since 1955 and New Zealand's largest aerial firefight on record with 22 helicopters involved.	2019 Nelson fires
2019	Australia		Starting on 29 October 2019, this rapidly became the largest single-ignition fire from lightning strike Australia has ever seen, reaching over 512,000 hectares (1,980 sq mi) with a perimeter of 1,503 kilometres (934 mi).	Gospers Mountain bushfire
2020	Cagua, Aragua state, Venezuela	11 killed.	On 23 January 2020, a fire was started in the Agrícola del Lago reed bed in Cagua, Aragua state, Venezuela. Eleven people were confirmed to have died as a result of the fire, all but two being minors.	Cagua fire
2025	Los Angeles area, California, U.S.	6 killed.	Began January 7, 2025; destroyed 5,000 structures and caused 6 deaths.	Eaton Fire
2025	Los Angeles area, California, U.S.	5 killed.	Began January 7, 2025; caused 5 deaths and more than 12,000 structures damaged or destroyed, more than 150,000 people evacuated.	Palisades Fire
2026	Los Gallardos, Almería, Spain	15 killed.	The Los Gallardos wildfire in Almería (July 9–24, 2026) burned 5,200 hectares and forced the evacuation of over 1,400 people across five municipalities. Caused 15 dead (12 were foreign residents) and 5 injured, it stands as the deadliest forest fire in Andalusia's history and the third deadliest in Spain.	2026 Almería wildfire

== See also ==
- List of fires by locations
  - List of fires in Canada
  - List of fires in China
  - List of fires in Egypt
  - List of fires in Kyoto
- List of accidents and disasters by death toll
- List of the largest artificial non-nuclear explosions
