= Great Fire of 1871 =

The Great Fire of 1871 may refer to any of several large fires in the Midwestern United States that began on October 8, 1871:

- 1871 Great Chicago Fire
- Great Michigan Fire
- Port Huron Fire of 1871 in Port Huron, Michigan
- Peshtigo Fire in Wisconsin
