= Great Fires of 1871 =

Series of 1871 fires in the US

- Approximate location of every known fire
- Date: September 29, 1871 – October 12, 1871
- Location: United States

Statistics
- Burned area: 3,000,000 acres (1,200,000 ha)

Impacts
- Deaths: Thousands

Ignition
- Cause: Controlled burns, railroad sparks, etc.

The Great Fires of 1871 were a series of conflagrations that took place throughout the final days of September and first weeks of October 1871 in the United States and elsewhere, primarily occurring in the Midwestern United States. These fires include the Great Chicago Fire, Peshtigo Fire, and Great Michigan Fire. In total, the fires burnt more than 3,000,000 acres (1,200,000 ha) of land and killed thousands.

== Background ==
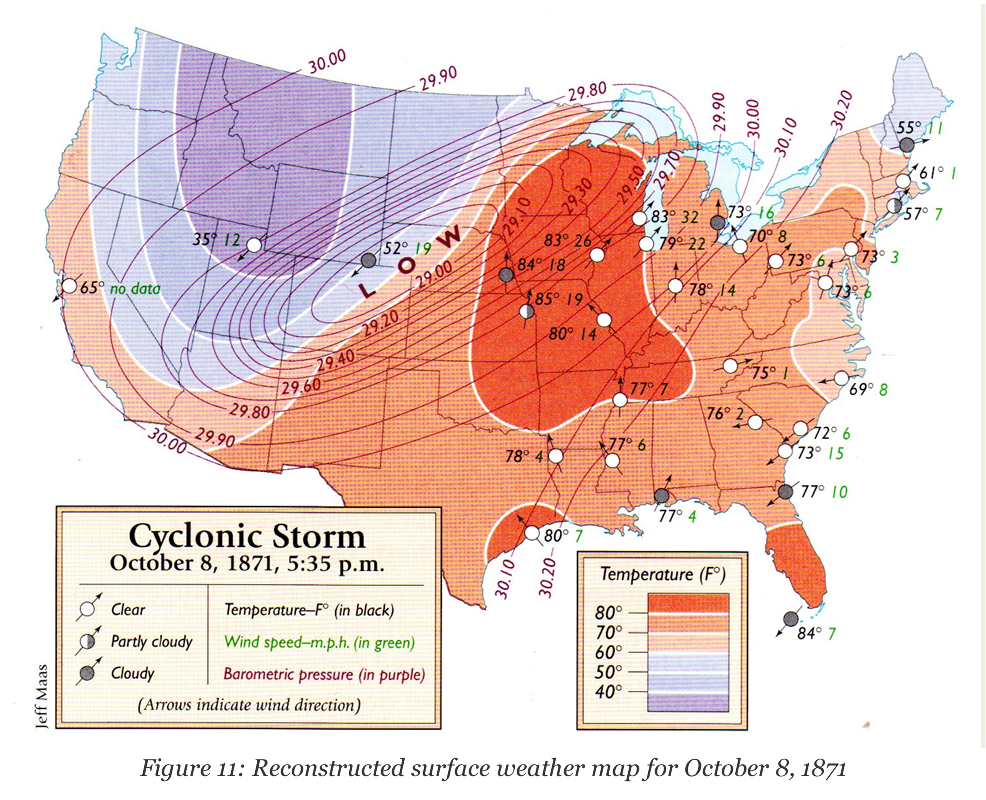
Reconstructed weather map on October 8, depicting the weather patterns that occurred

The summer of 1871 saw a prolonged severe drought. A report from the National Weather Service in Chicago stated that "leaves had started dropping as early as July." Only 134 mm of rain had fallen in Chicago compared to the average of more than 230 mm. Lansing, Michigan, reported 70% of the average and Thunder Bay, Michigan, reported just 64%. On the first week of October 1871 a strong low-pressure area accompanied by a cold front had moved in, also coupled with an area of high-pressure centered over the eastern portion of the United States. These factors at the time created strong southwesterly winds (also known as a pressure gradient) across the Midwest. The first week of October also had "tinder dry" conditions, perfect for fires.

== Fires ==
=== Wisconsin ===
==== Peshtigo Fire ====
The Peshtigo Fire occurred on October 8, 1871, in Wisconsin. It is considered among the deadliest fires in recorded history. The fire was said to have been started due to slash and burn methods and grown by the winds. Peter Pernin (an eyewitness) wrote "When turning my gaze from the river I chanced to look either to the right or left, before me or upwards, I saw nothing but flames." In total the fire spanned across 6 counties and 1.2–1.5 million acres, killed 1,200 to 1,500 people, and damaged a total of 16 towns. The only structures that remained in Peshtigo was a brick kiln and a house constructed of new wood. Today there is a museum and cemetery to commemorate the fire.

==== Other Wisconsin fires ====
Another fire burned in the lower half of the Door Peninsula. A misconception is that the Peshtigo fire "jumped" across the bay to the Door Peninsula; however these were separate fires. The fire started south of New Franken and spread due to the wind. The fire burned the towns of Union, Brussels and Forestville. The fire also burnt the town of Williamsonville (located in modern-day Gardner) which left only 17 alive from the population of 77. The town did not rebuild. The fire spanned from its starting point to south of Sturgeon Bay and an estimated 7,500 people were left homeless due to the fire.

Another fire broke out in Monroe, Wisconsin 10 days after the conflagrations in Peshtigo and Chicago. This fire burned three stores to the ground and caused around $20,000 in damages. No lives were lost in the fire.

=== Illinois ===
==== Chicago ====
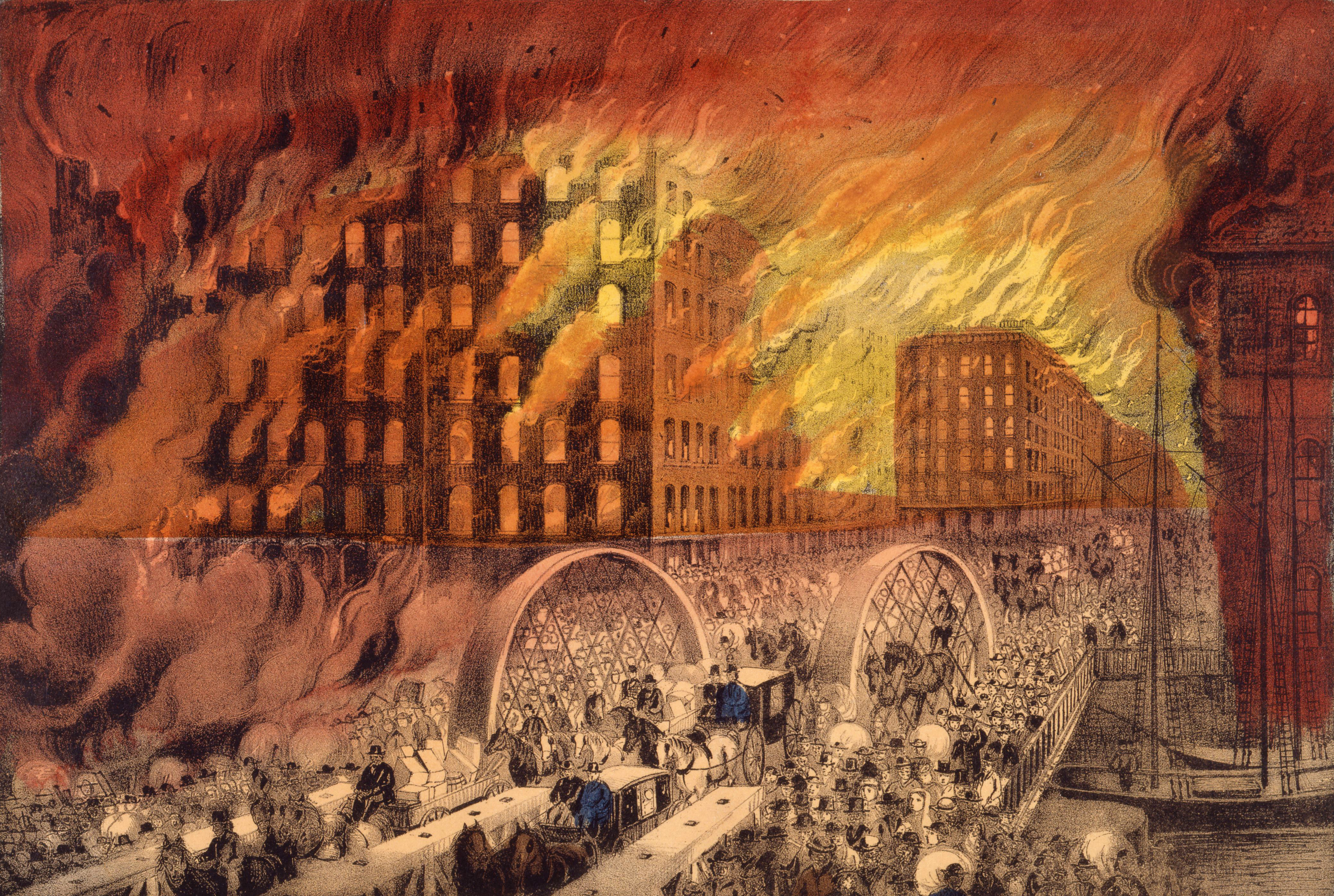
Painting of the Great Chicago Fire by Currier and Ives

Illinois suffered the best-known fire in American history, the Great Chicago Fire. The fire broke out at around 8:30 pm on October 8 near or in a barn belonging to the O'Leary family. The fire is reputed to have been started by a cow belonging to Catherine O'Leary, which knocked over a lantern in a barn, but this is unconfirmed and what started the fire is unknown. The fire quickly spread due to the strong winds mentioned previously. As well, the fire created a fire whirl, which flung burning debris and thus started new fires. The fire eventually burned itself out. A rain that started on the night of October 9 helped smother it. The fire killed around 300 people, burned 2,112 acres, and produced a loss of $222 million. The fire spurred Chicago and other cities to enact new building codes to try to prevent fires from breaking out and from spreading.

==== Urbana ====
On the same day of the Great Chicago Fire, a fire broke out in Urbana. It was caused by children playing with matches in an alley. It burned a few buildings.

=== Minnesota ===
The first of the great fires, the Great Prairie Fire, started in Minnesota on the October 5. Ottawa Daily Citizen reported "A conflagration has been raging on the prairie and in the big woods west since Friday last." This shows the fire started around September 29. The fire's cause is unknown, but it began around Breckenridge and quickly spread due to strong winds towards the "Big Woods" region. By October 6 the fire had reached as far south as the Iowa border, as far east as the Minnesota River. At least 2 lives were lost.

=== Michigan ===
Michigan saw many fires spread across the whole state. These fires were said to be caused by land clearing fires that grew out of control due to the "slash" that laid on the ground due to heavy logging. The fire also grew due to the strong winds. The cities of Holland and Manistee were completely destroyed and other cities such as Alpena and Port Huron (in the Port Huron Fire) were damaged. The city and county of Menominee was damaged in the Peshtigo Fire. Overall the fires burnt around 2.5 million acres.

=== Kansas ===
Kansas experienced multiple prairie fires including one "about 15 miles up Soldier Creek", one "from Osage City to Dragoon Creek, a distance of six miles", another "at the head of Mulberry, Chapman, and the east branch of Pipe creeks," and one north of Thayer.

=== New York ===
New York saw multiple fires in Orange, Sullivan, and Ulster counties. In Orange County, fires burnt along railroads, and the Shawangunk Mountains were "for miles... a sheet of flame". Sullivan County's lumber industry suffered as a large amounts of hemlock bark shavings were on the ground. Fire damaged the towns of Bethel, Forestburgh, and Port Jervis.

=== Elsewhere in the U.S. ===
Nebraska also experienced multiple prairie fires near Covington, Fremont, and North Bend.

Fires along the Toledo and Wabash Railway burnt near cities such as Antwerp and New Haven.

Pennsylvania suffered fires in Pike County, around Matamoras, and in Carbon County around White Haven.

New Jersey suffered from fires in Sussex County, across the river from Pike County, Pennsylvania.

On October 5, Iowa suffered a fire in Burlington.

Yankton, South Dakota suffered a fire on October 5.

Some historians suspect many additional fires may have also occurred. Professor Increase A. Lapham wrote a report to the Chief Signal Officer saying "The work of extending the prairie border was exhibited in the autumn of 1871 upon the grandest scale. Fires have swept more or less completely along the whole northern frontier, from the Rocky Mountains through Dakota, Minnesota, Wisconsin, and Michigan, and even into New York and Pennsylvania." Another source states that the fires "extended to Utah, Nevada, California, and Oregon in the west, and to Virginia, Pennsylvania, and eastern New York."

=== Canada ===
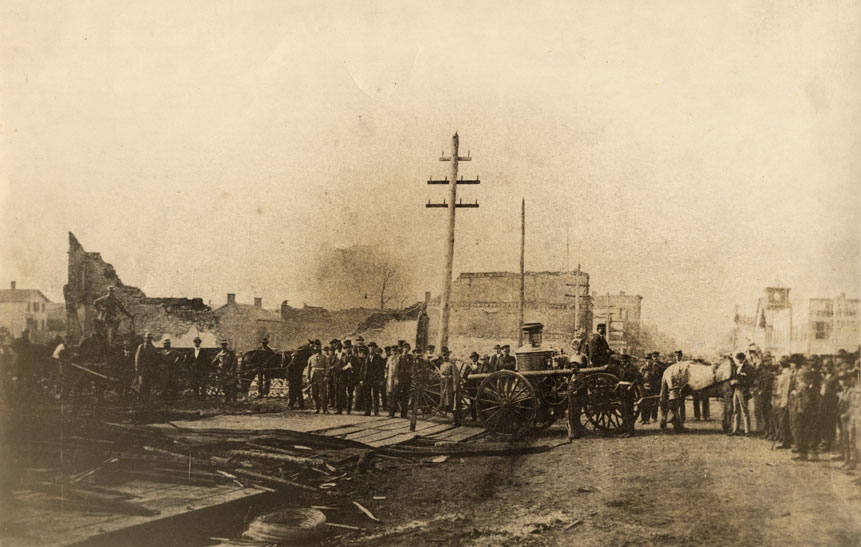
Image taken after the Windsor Fire

On October 12 a fire broke out in Windsor, Ontario, caused by an overheated iron. The fire quickly ravaged most of the wood buildings in the commercial district. There were no deaths, but 100 buildings were destroyed. Many of the citizens rebuilt their houses out of brick to prevent future fires.

The Empire article from October 16, 1871 mentions many fires along the Ottawa River started by land clearing. The fires were worst between Alymer and Gatineau. The towns of Quyon, Pembroke, and Sand Point were also damaged. The article mentions that "it is not only the brushwood and the forest trees that burn, the very sod is instinct with fire"

== Theories ==
The concurrence of these fires raised many to theorize about their cause.

One theory arose two years after the fires. The theory is that fragments of Biela's Comet, which split into pieces around 1845, plummeted through the atmosphere, impacted at the location of the fires and lit them ablaze. However, experts dispute such a scenario—meteorites in fact are cold to the touch when they reach the Earth's surface, and there are no credible reports of any fire anywhere having been started by a meteorite. Given the low tensile strength of such bodies, if a fragment of an icy comet were to strike the Earth, the most likely outcome would be for it to disintegrate in the upper atmosphere, leading to a meteor air burst.

Another theory states that lightning caused the fires.

There are also many theories on what caused the Great Chicago Fire specifically. For example, one theory states that a group of gambling men started the fire.
