= Huron City Historic District =

- U.S. National Register of Historic Places
- U.S. Historic district
- Michigan State Historic Site
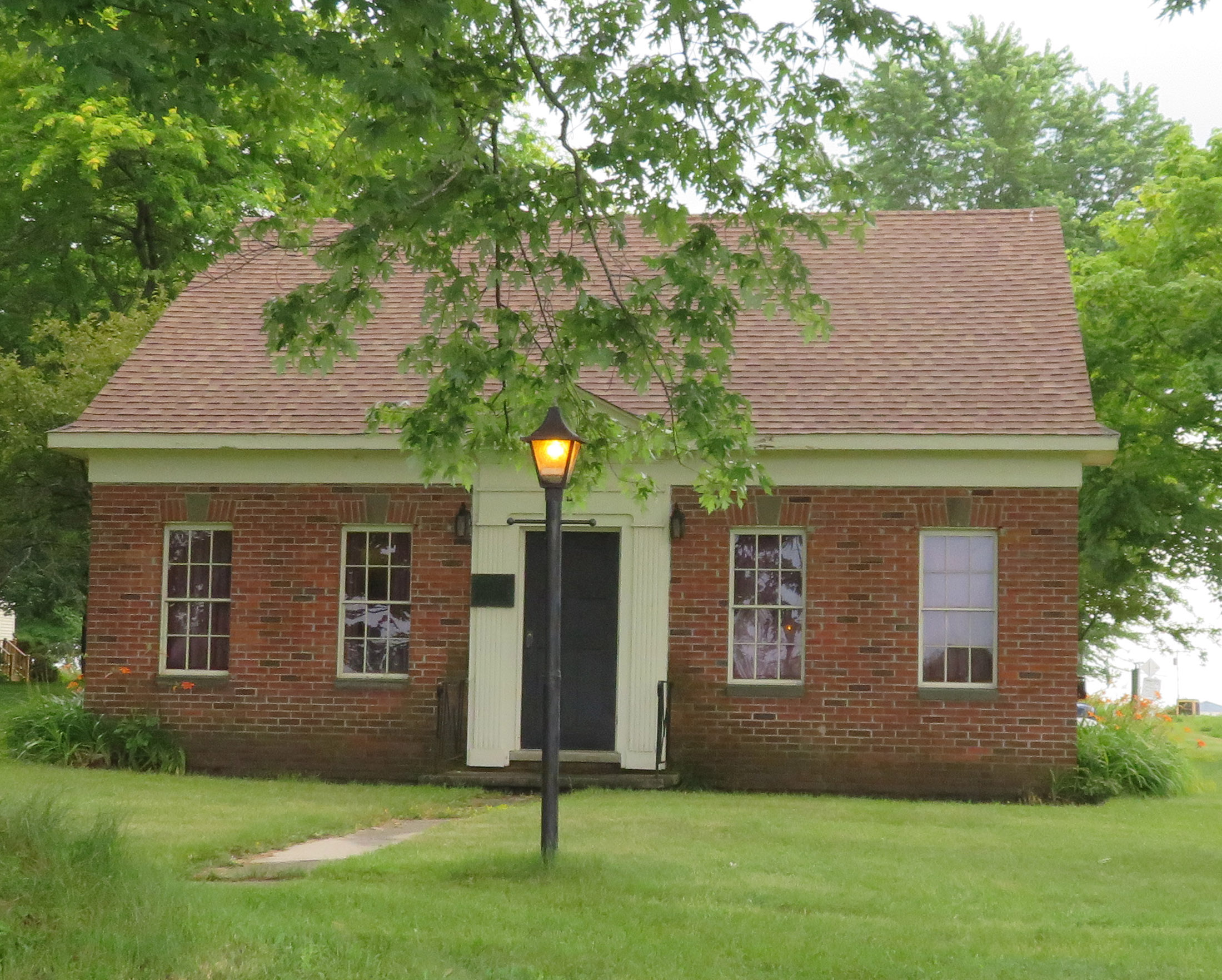
- Lakeview House

- Location within Michigan Location within the United States
- Interactive map
- Location: Pioneer Dr., Huron and Port Austin Townships, Huron City, Michigan
- Coordinates: 44°1′52″N 82°49′57″W
- Area: 93 acres (38 ha)
- Built: 1856
- Architectural style: Stick/eastlake
- NRHP reference No.: 95000446
- Added to NRHP: April 28, 1995

The Huron City Historic District is a historic district encompassing the village of Huron City, Michigan, with structures located primarily along Pioneer Drive. The district was listed on the National Register of Historic Places in 1995.

== History ==
The area around Huron City was first settled as part of the area's lumber boom, with a sawmill constructed at this location in the 1830s or 1840s. By 1852, P. F. Brakeman & Co. was operating a water-powered sawmill. Brakeman sold out to Dowling & Forbes of Port Huron, who sold to R. B. Hubbard & Co., a lumbering firm owned by Bloomfield, Connecticut brothers Langdon and Watson Hubbard and their cousin Rollin Barnard Hubbard; the company itself was based in Sandusky, Ohio. R. B. Hubbard & Co. managed a mill in Lexington, Michigan, and began developing their Huron City operation in the mid-late 1850s. By 1867, both Rollin and Watson Hubbard were working in Sandusky, leaving Langdon Hubbard in charge of the Huron City operations.

By 1871, the Hubbard sawmill was reportedly producing 40,000 board feet of lumber per day, and a settlement had grown up around it. However, the Great Michigan Fire of 1871 completely destroyed the town. Hubbard rebuilt, and by 1875 the sawmill was rebuilt, and the village has a store, hotel, school, and houses. After the fire, Langdon Hubbard began obtaining rights to parcels in the village from the other Hubbard & Co. partners, and by 1881 effectively controlled the entire settlement. However, the 1881 Thumb Fire again entirely destroyed the village of Huron City, with Langdon Hubbard's losses reported at $50,000.

Hubbard again rebuilt, constructing a grist mill, saw mill, boardinghouse, hotel, school, stores, and a number of houses. The sawmill was still in business, but local timber was scarce, and there was an influx of newcomers seeking farmland in the area, allowing Hubbard to sell what had previously been timberland. Langdon Hubbard died in 1892, and William H. Bennett took over the mill. However, without Hubbard, Huron City began to slowly wither. The hotel closed in 1901, the mill in 1903, and by 1907 there was only a single business in town.

However, Hubbard's daughter Annabel had married William Lyon Phelps in 1892, and the couple summered in Huron City nearly every year until Annabel's death in 1938. The Phelpses owned nearly all of Huron City, and the village transformed from a declining mill town to a small rural hamlet, maintaining the former hotel as a community gathering place and re-landscaping portions of the village. After Annabel's death in 1938, Phelps turned over control of the town to his niece Carolyn Hubbard Parcells, who with her husband Charles began the project of preserving Huron City. In 1946 they established the William Lyon Phelps Foundation, which constructed a museum, and restored the general store and hotel.

== Description ==
The Huron City Historic District includes a number of structures, nearly all of which date to the mid-1880s rebuilding of the village after the Thumb Fire. The LaGassa Log House - a relocated structure - is also located within the Historic District. From 1964 to 2017, the site also served as the home for some relocated portions of the Pointe aux Barques United States Life-Saving Service (LSS) Station.

The structures are generally located along Pioneer Drive and Huron City Road. Significant structures and locations, from west to east along Pioneer Drive, include:

- Cemetery: The cemetery covers a half acre of ground, and includes 12 marked graves, the earliest of which is of Langdon Hubbard.
- Allen House: A 1-1/2 story, T-plan front-gable building with a one-story, side-gable wing to either side. The house is clad with clapboard and has paired front windows. It likely was constructed in the 1880s.
- Hubbard Grist Mill site: A grist mill was constructed in this location in 1883, but there are no visible remnants.
- Hubbard Saw Mill site: At least two sawmills, one built after the 1871 fire and the second built in 1883 occupied this site. Earlier mills may have been located at the same site. There are no visible remnants.
- Langdon Hubbard General Store: The general store is a large, two-story, front-gable building, standing on a fieldstone foundation and covered with clapboard. A full-width one-story veranda runs across the front. The store sold a mixture of groceries/soft goods and hardware.
- Pottenger House: This two-story, front-gable, clapboarded house was built in the 1880s. It was the home of William Pottenger, general manager of the town for the Phelpses.
- Langdon Hubbard House: The Hubbard House is a T-shaped, two-story, cross-gable-roof structure with Gothic windows and bargeboards. A front veranda extends across the building. It was built in two sections, in 1881 and in 1886.
- LaGassa Log House: This is a one-story, rectangular, gable-roof log cabin made of square-hewn, half-saddle-notched logs. It was constructed in the late 1830s or early 1840s by Mitchell and Delia LaGassa at a location along M-25 about two miles west of the present location. It was moved in 1922 to become a granary, and again in 1930 by Annabel Hubbard Phelps to her property to use as a tea house. It was moved again, to its present site, in 1958/60.
- Hubbard Memorial Church: The church is a cross-gable-roof, clapboarded building with a symmetrical façade. It was originally constructed in 1883, and had substantial additions in the 1920s.
- Lakeview House: The Lakeview House hotel, built in 1883-84. It is a two-story, front-gable building covered in clapboard, with a one-story veranda in front and a hip-roof, one-story, rear ell. It now serves as a museum.
- Point aux Barques United States Life-Saving Service Station (former): This station opened in 1876 on the shore of Lake Huron, about two miles east of Huron City (near the present-day boat launch and campground at Lighthouse County Park). Two historic station buildings were saved from demolition when they were relocated to Huron City in 1964. The buildings that were saved consist of a 1-1/2-story, gable-roof building which housed the life-saving apparatus and a 1-1/2-story dwelling with office for the station's captain. The two structures were originally connected by an enclosed breezeway. In October–November 2017, the Life-Saving Service structures that were moved to Huron City were moved back to near their original location and set on new foundations. The two buildings now sit about 100 feet from the Pointe aux Barques Lighthouse, and about 1,000 feet north-by-northwest of their original historic location, in Lighthouse County Park.

== Gallery ==
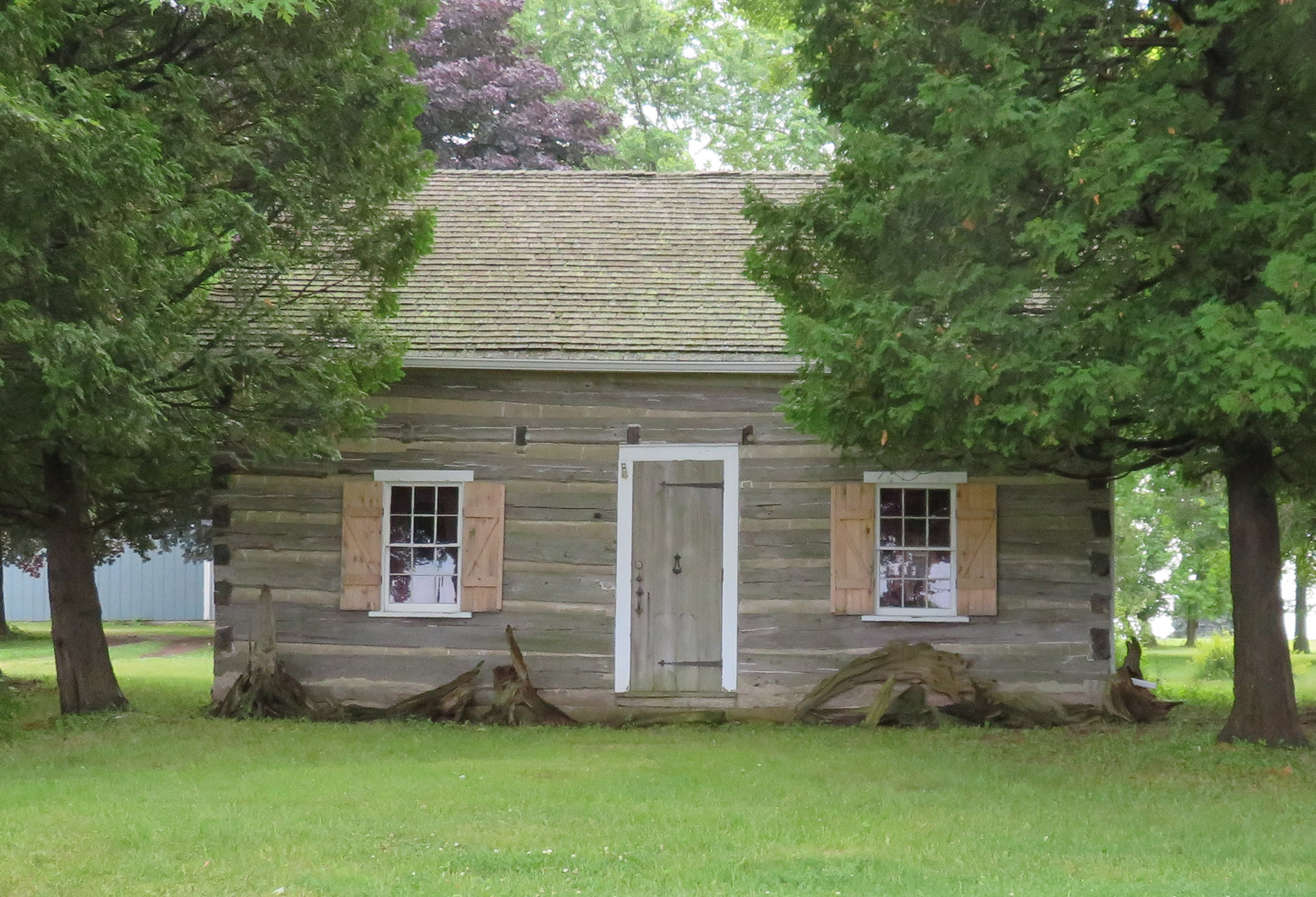
LaGassa Log House

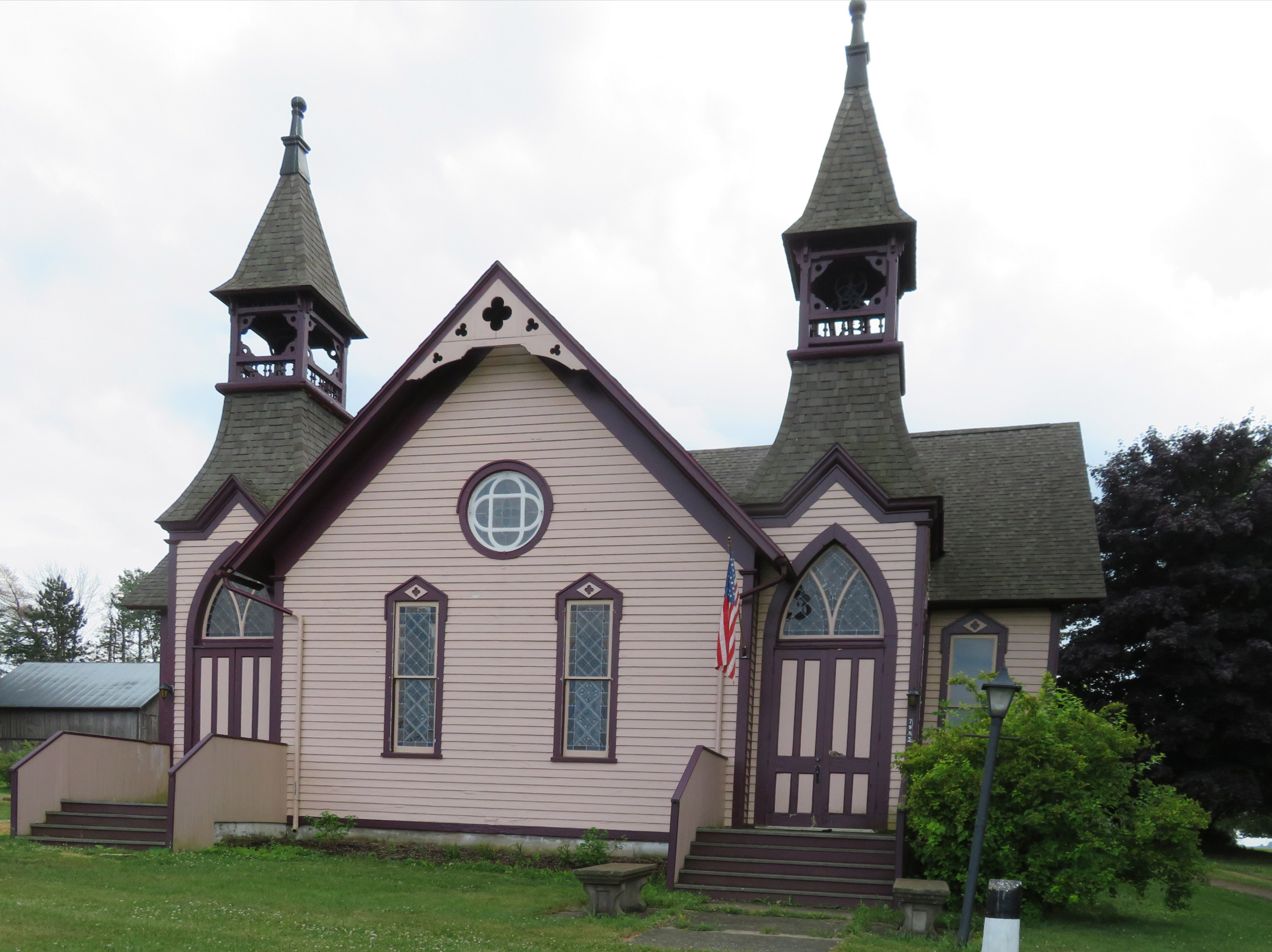
Hubbard Memorial Church

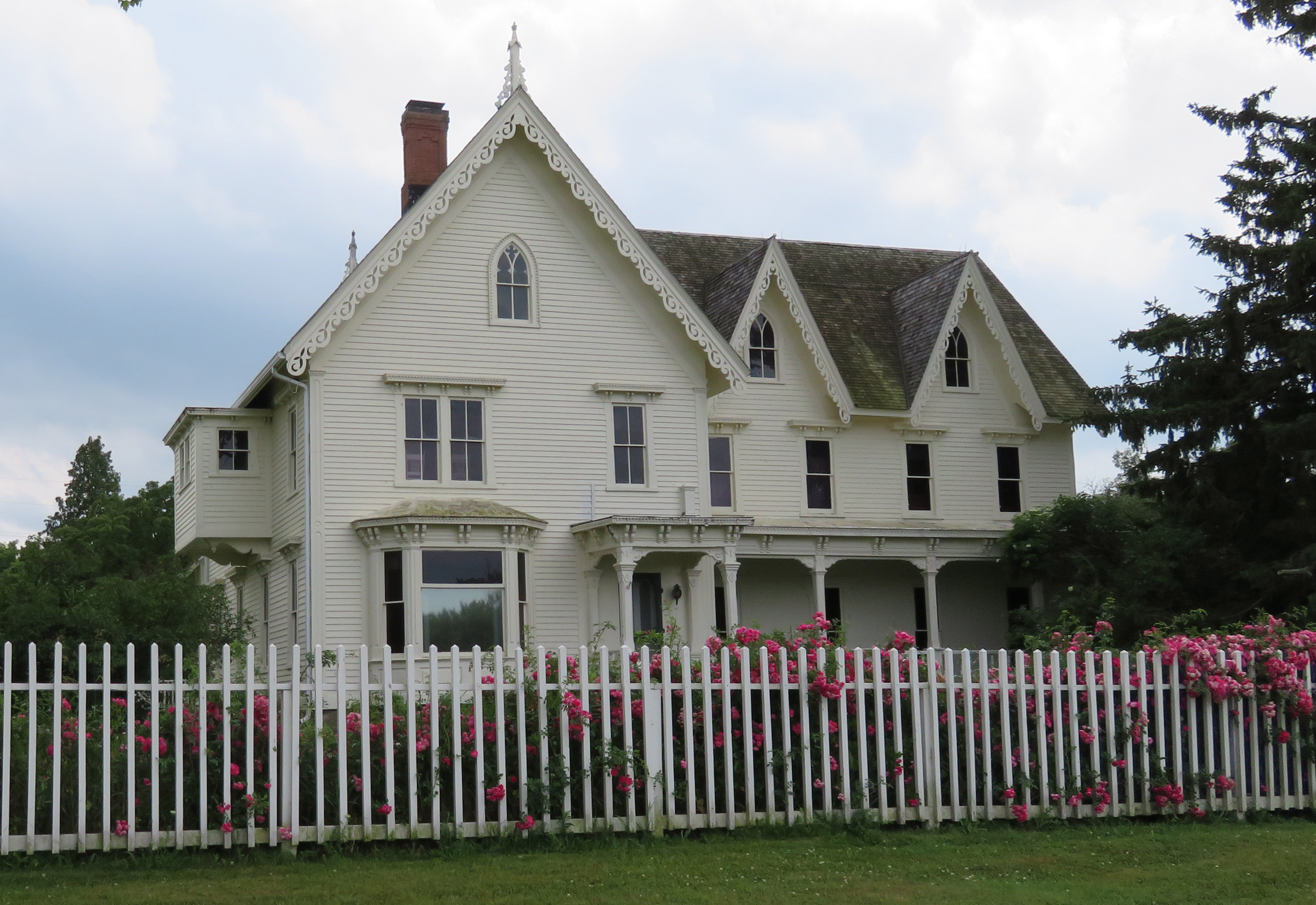
Langdon Hubbard House

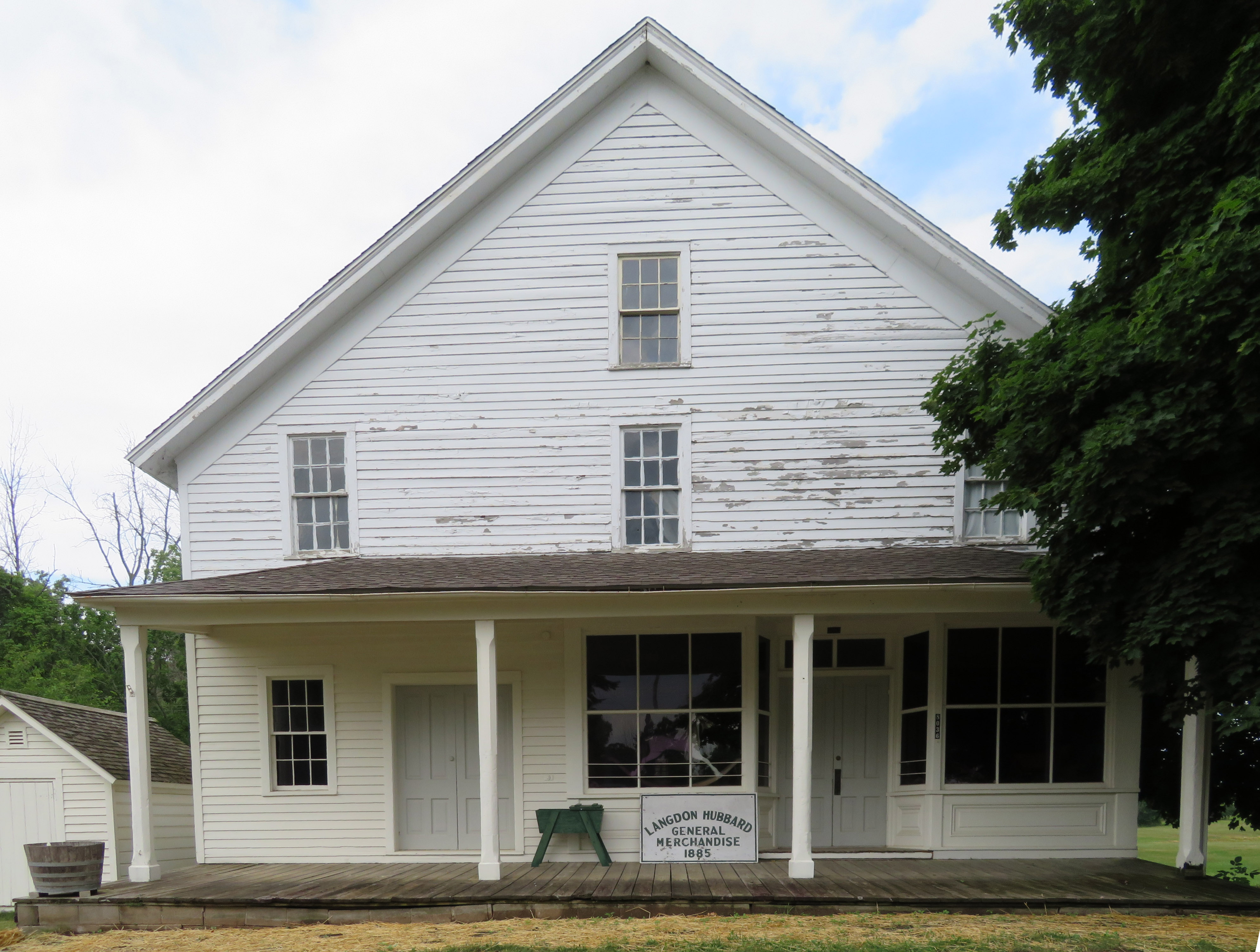
Langdon Hubbard General Store
