= Duck Lake Fire =

2012 wildfire in Michigan

- Date: May 23 – June 15, 2012
- Location: McMillan Township, Michigan, United States
- Coordinates: 46°32′07″N 85°23′40″W

Statistics
- Burned area: 21,964 acres (88.9 km^{2})

Impacts
- Deaths: 0
- Structures destroyed: 136
- Cost: $450,557

Ignition
- Cause: Lightning strike

Map
- Location within the state of Michigan

The Duck Lake Fire occurred north of the Village of Newberry in Luce County, Michigan in the eastern half of the Upper Peninsula of Michigan. The fire started with a lightning strike on Wednesday, May 23, 2012 near Duck Lake. The Duck Lake Fire was reported 100% contained by the Michigan DNR on 15 June 2012 with 21,135 acres burned. The Duck Lake Fire was reported as the third worst fire in Michigan since 1881. (Note: The Christian Science Monitor listed the 1,000,000-acre Thumb fire of 1881 and the 25,000-acre Mio fire of 1980 surpassing Duck Lake which replaced the 18,000-acre Sleeper Lakes Fire of 2007 as third. However they missed the 72,000-acre Seney Fire of 1976, the 300,000-acre Metz Fire of 1908, the 228,00-acre Ontonagon Fire of 1896, the 64,000-acre Ishpeming fire of 1896 and possibly the 1911 Au Sable-Oscoda Fire. The Great Fire of 1871 exceeded all of these.) It was the second major fire in Luce County within five years. On May 25, 2012, Governor Rick Snyder declared a state of disaster in Luce and Schoolcraft counties, which included a ban of fireworks and an outdoor burning ban in 49 counties, including all counties located in the Upper Peninsula and much of the northern half of the Lower Peninsula as a result of abnormally dry conditions. The fire caused the closure of Tahquamenon Falls State Park during the Memorial Day weekend.

== Fire progression ==
The fire began in the vicinity of Duck Lake, near Falls Road and M-123 and burned towards the north over largely uninhabited jack pine forest. By 10:00 p.m. on May 24, 2012, the fire had burned over 9,500 acres (3,800 ha). By 4:00 p.m. the next day, the fire had burned nearly 18,000 acres (7,300 ha). At that point, the fire affected an area slightly smaller than that of the Sleeper Lakes fire. By May 31, 2012 the most recent GPS size estimate showed the fire had burned 21,964 acres (8,889 ha). Hundreds of properties had been affected and 132 structures (including 46 homes) were lost. Fire crews made progress with 51% percent containment. Several showers and thunderstorms helped during the afternoon and evening. The total cost to date for the wildfire is $450,557. By June 4, the fire was reported as 72 percent contained with no smoke plume and no significant activity since May 28. Damage assessments found 136 structures lost: 49 homes/cabins (including a store and a motel), 23 garages, 38 sheds or outbuildings and 26 campers on 21,135 burnt acres.

By June 15, 2012, the fire was 100% contained after almost 43 miles of fire line were built. 300 people were involved in the fire response.

== See also ==
- List of Michigan wildfires
