= Huron Township, Michigan =

- Civil township
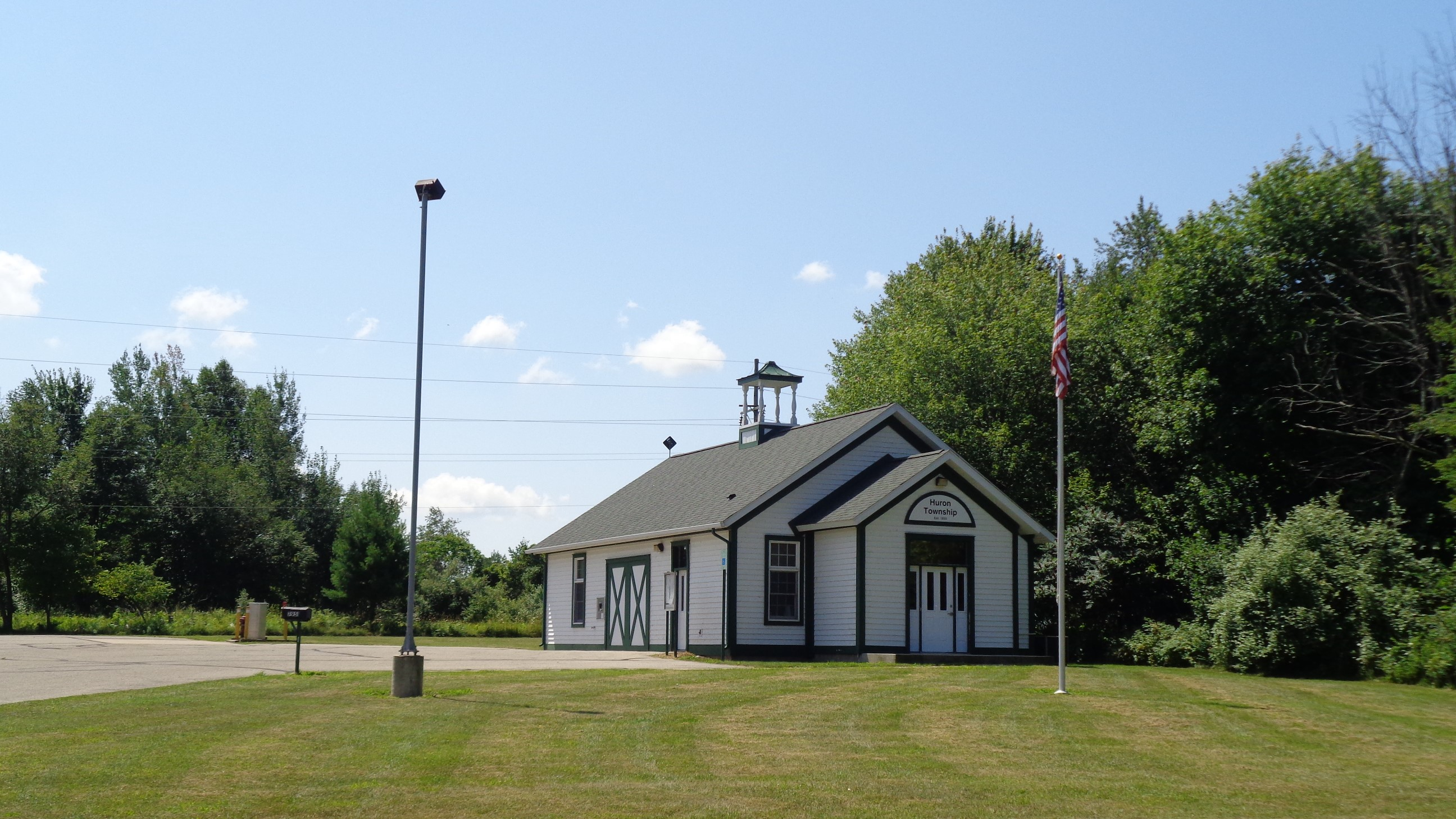
- Huron Township Hall

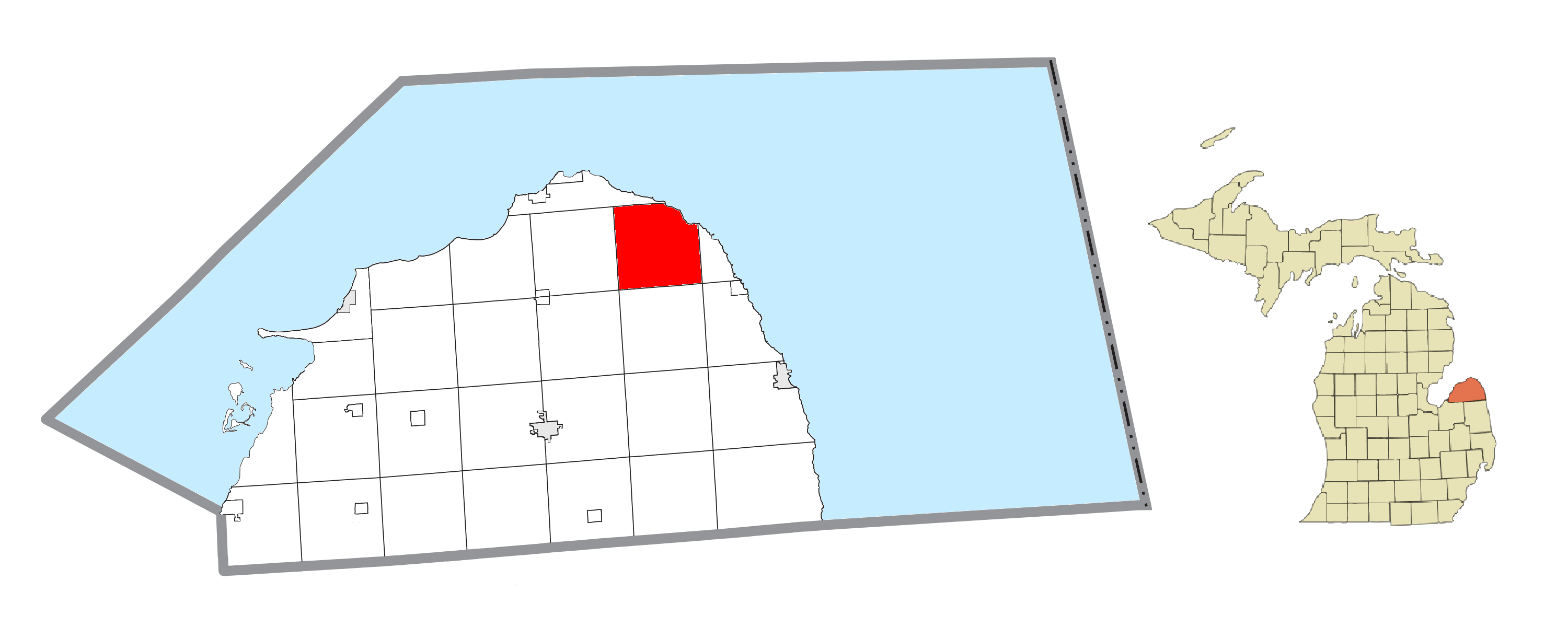
- Location within Huron County

- Location within the state of Michigan Huron Township (the United States)
- Coordinates: 43°59′10″N 82°50′06″W
- Country: United States
- State: Michigan
- County: Huron
- Organized: 1854

Government
  - Supervisor: Bill Haas

Area
  - Total: 33.6 sq mi (87.1 km^{2})
  - Land: 33.6 sq mi (87.1 km^{2})
  - Water: 0 sq mi (0.0 km^{2})
- Elevation: 669 ft (204 m)

Population (2020)
  - Total: 352
  - Density: 10.5/sq mi (4.04/km^{2})
- Time zone: UTC-5 (Eastern (EST))
  - Summer (DST): UTC-4 (EDT)
- ZIP code(s): 48432, 48445, 48467, 48468
- Area code: 989
- FIPS code: 26-40020
- GNIS feature ID: 1626506
- Website: Official website

Huron Township is a civil township of Huron County in the U.S. state of Michigan. The population was 352 at the 2020 census.

== Communities ==
- Huron City is an unincorporated community in the township on Pioneer and Huron City Roads near M-25 near the mouth of Willow Creek on Lake Huron at 44°01′45″N 82°49′58″W. It was formerly a lumber town, destroyed in the Port Huron Fire of 1871 and Thumb Fire of 1881, the town was rebuilt after each, but faded as the lumber industry died out. The post office was closed in 1905. The Huron City Historic District is listed on the National Register of Historic Places.
- Glencoe is an unincorporated community on the township's border with Dwight Township at Verona and Day Roads.
- Lewisville is an unincorporated community in the township on the boundary with Bloomfield Township at the junction of Kinde and Huron City Roads at 43°56′40″N 82°50′06″W.

== Geography ==
According to the United States Census Bureau, the township has a total area of 33.6 square miles (87 km^{2}), all land.

== Demographics ==
As of the census of 2000, there were 423 people, 191 households, and 143 families residing in the township. The population density was 12.6 inhabitants per square mile (4.9/km^{2}). There were 406 housing units at an average density of 12.1 per square mile (4.7/km^{2}). The racial makeup of the township was 99.53% White, 0.24% Native American and 0.24% Asian. Hispanic or Latino of any race were 0.71% of the population.

There were 191 households, out of which 20.4% had children under the age of 18 living with them, 68.1% were married couples living together, 3.7% had a female householder with no husband present, and 25.1% were non-families. 24.6% of all households were made up of individuals, and 12.0% had someone living alone who was 65 years of age or older. The average household size was 2.21 and the average family size was 2.61.

In the township the population was spread out, with 17.3% under the age of 18, 4.0% from 18 to 24, 17.0% from 25 to 44, 33.8% from 45 to 64, and 27.9% who were 65 years of age or older. The median age was 51 years. For every 100 females, there were 110.4 males. For every 100 females age 18 and over, there were 110.8 males.

The median income for a household in the township was $33,250, and the median income for a family was $37,031. Males had a median income of $32,143 versus $25,000 for females. The per capita income for the township was $19,725. About 9.4% of families and 11.0% of the population were below the poverty line, including 12.3% of those under age 18 and 11.4% of those age 65 or over.
