= Williamsonville, Wisconsin =

Town in Wisconsin, United States

- Location within the state of Wisconsin Williamsonville, Wisconsin (the United States)
- Coordinates: 44°45′58.7″N 87°32′22.4″W

Williamsonville is a former community in Door County, Wisconsin. It was settled in the late 1860s by the Williamson brothers and destroyed by a fire in 1871.

== History ==
Williamsonville was first settled by brothers Thomas and Fred Williamson in the late 1860s. The town was built near Wisconsin Highway 57 and Williamson's Mill, a steam-powered shingle mill on the Ahnapee River built in 1870. Within a year, the town saw the addition of a general store, a boarding house with a well, a blacksmith, and eight houses. By 1871, the town had 77 residents, the majority of whom were members of the Williamson family or mill workers.

== Fire ==
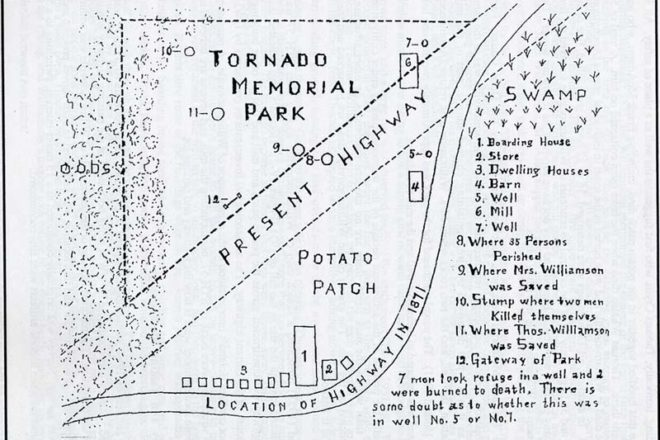
1931 Map of Williamsonville made by Hjalmar Holand

On October 8, 1871, the same time that the Peshtigo fire began in Peshtigo, Wisconsin, a fire started near New Franken and burned north towards Williamsonville. A common misconception is that the Peshtigo fire spread across Green Bay to in Door County. The fire was caused by the extremely dry conditions and lumbering practices that left behind downed vegetation and other debris. The fire grew out of multiple smaller fires. Weeks before the Peshtigo Fire, residents of Williamsonville had been fighting smaller fires. The fire spread quickly due to strong winds until it turned into a dangerous firestorm. Residents claimed to have experienced “tornadoes of fire”. Thirty-five residents of the city huddled together in a potato field, expecting the cultivated land to stop the fire's spread. However, the firestorm quickly went over the land and killed all thirty-five. Two men experienced such extreme pain from the fire that they committed suicide by bashing their heads on a stump. At the same time, seven men hid in the city well, and five of them survived. Only seventeen residents survived the fire. The only members of the Williamson family to survive were Thomas and his mother. Fifteen of sixteen horses, five of six oxen, and forty pigs also died in the fire. Williamsonville did not rebuild after the fire. In 1878, a map of Door County showed the place named "Tornado", which at that time consisted only of a post office and a saloon. The fire cleared so many trees that the main industry in Door County switched from lumber to agriculture.

== Today ==
In 1927, Tornado Memorial County Park was created. The park was the first in the Door County Park System and was named after the tornadoes of fire reported during the 1871 fire. The park was built around the well where seven men hid during the fire. In 1950, the Wisconsin DOT used the park as a highway wayside rest, but this designation was removed in 2008 with the expansion of Highway 57. The park features two bronze plaques memorializing the lives lost in the fire. The well still stands and has a wooden memorial to the men who hid in it.
