= List of Michigan wildfires =

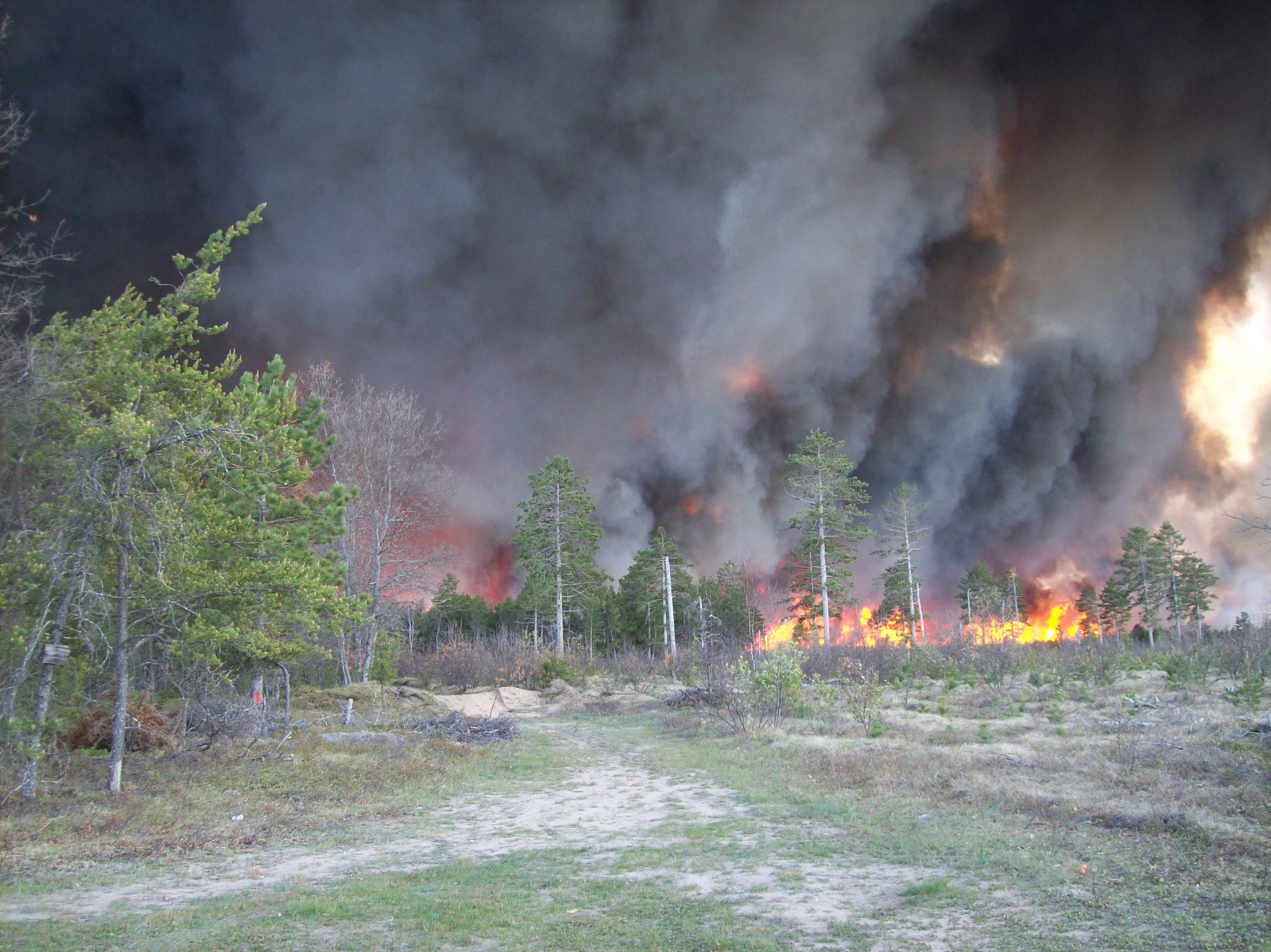
The Meridian Boundary Fire burned 8,586 acres near Grayling, Michigan in 2010.

The U.S. state of Michigan has been the site of several major wildfires. The worst of these were in the lumbering era of the late 1800s, when lumbering practices permitted the buildup of large slash piles and altered forest growth patterns, which may have contributed to size of the wildfires. The scattered nature of settlements, lumber camps and Indian tribes during this time led to large uncertainties in determining the number of deaths and property losses. More recent fires have been much smaller and contained by modern firefighting methods, with better records of the destruction they caused. Almost all of the thousands of yearly fires in the state cover only a few acres, although 100-200 homes are damaged each year by these small fires.

== Wildfires ==
This is a partial and incomplete list of wildfires in the US state of Michigan.

Fire	Date	Location	Size (acres)	Size (km^{2})	Damage	Deaths	Notes
Great Michigan Fires	1871 October 8	multiple locations	over 1,500,000	over 6,000	thousands	hundreds	fires across Wisconsin, Michigan, and the cities of Holland, Manistee and Chicago
Port Huron Fire of 1871	1871 October 8	The Thumb	1,200,000	4,850	thousands	50+	same day as the Great Michigan fire
Peshtigo Fire	1871 October 8	Menominee County, Michigan	hundreds of thousands	hundreds	thousands	dozens	same day as the Great Chicago fire
Thumb Fire	1881 September 5	The Thumb	1,000,000	4,000	over 2,000 structures	282	
Ontonagon Fire	1896 August	Ontonagon	228,000	923	hundreds	1	
Ishpeming fire	1896 October	Ishpeming	64,000	259	unknown	unknown	
Metz Fire	1908 October 15	Metz	300,000	1,200	hundreds of structures	37	15 deaths occurred when the rescue train derailed in a burning lumber siding.
Au Sable-Oscoda Fire	1911 July 11	Iosco County	thousands	dozens	hundreds	5+	Acreage burned unclear because of numerous fires burning the area that year
Seney Fire	1976 August - October	Seney National Wildlife Refuge	78,000	316	0	0	burned for months underground in peat
Mack Lake fire	1980 May 5	Mio	25,000	101	44 homes	1	
Meridian Boundary Fire	2010 May	Crawford County	8,586	34.7	12 homes, 39 structures	0	Caused by a man burning leaves; the man had a permit to burn
Duck Lake fire	2012 May–June	Luce County	21,000	85	136 structures	0	
Sleeper Lake Fire	2007 August	Luce County	18,000	73	0	0	
Horne Fire	2021 August	Isle Royale	300		0	0	Primarily burned the area surrounding Monument Rock
Blue Lakes Fire	2022 May	Montmorency, Cheboygan counties	2,516	>10		0	This wildfire started from a lightning strike on May 11 which smoldered for several days before igniting nearby fuels (leaves, grass, bushes).
Wilderness Trail Fire	2023 June	Crawford County	2,442	12.1	$100,000	0	Caused by a campfire, 85% contained as of June 4

== Gallery ==
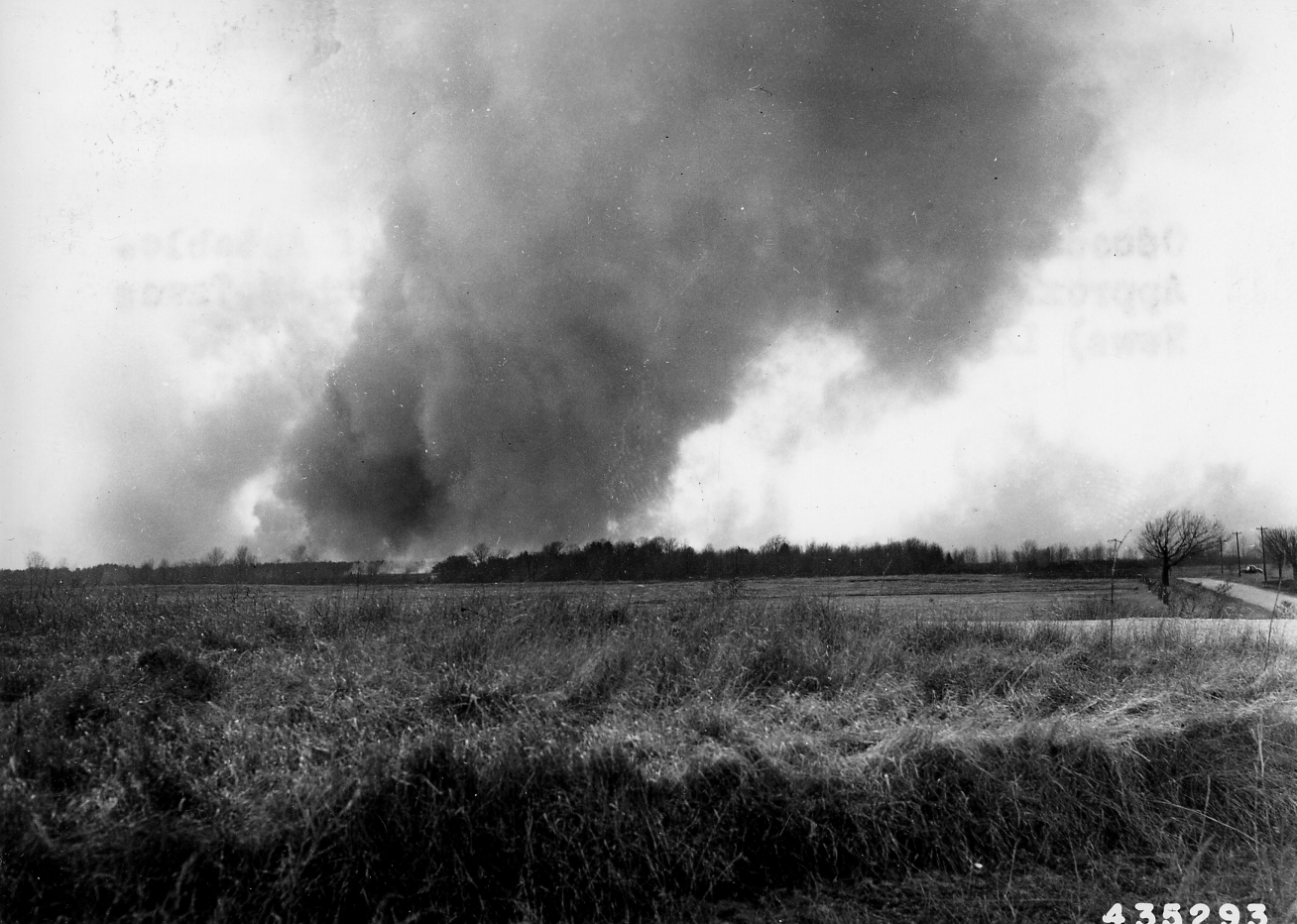
Oscoda Fire of 1945

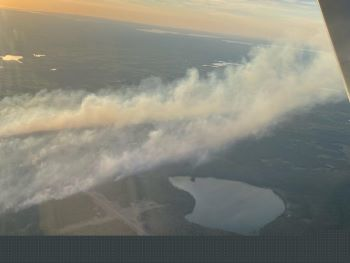
Aerial photo of the Blue Lakes Fire on May 14, 2022

== Bibliography ==
- Hanines, D. A.; Sando, R. W. (1969), Climatic Conditions Preceding Historically Great Fires in the North Central Region (PDF), U.S.D.A. Forest Service Research Paper NC-34; see Figure 1., archived from the original (PDF) on February 8, 2012
