= Pigeon Valley Fire =

Wildfire in Tasman District, New Zealand

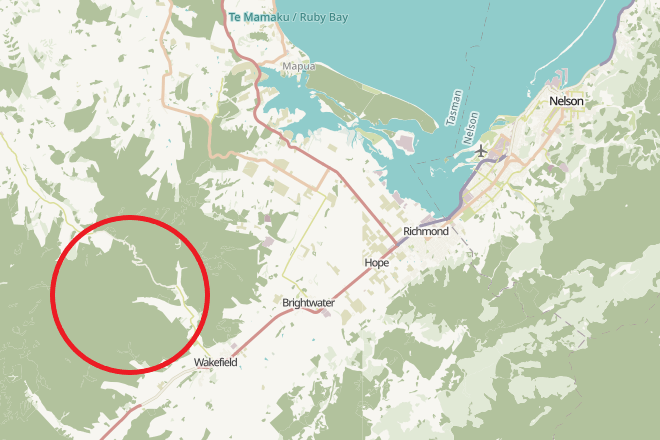
- Map showing the location of Pigeon Valley in red, nearby Wakefield
- Date: 5 February 2019 – 6 March 2019
- Location: Tasman District, New Zealand
- Coordinates: 41.37°S 173.00°E

Statistics
- Burned area: 2,400 ha (18 February)

Impacts
- Structures destroyed: One home

Ignition
- Cause: Machinery spark

The Pigeon Valley Fire was a wildfire in the Tasman District and briefly the largest wildfire in New Zealand history before being surpassed by the Lake Ōhau Fire a year later.

The fire began on the afternoon of 5 February following a spark caused by farming equipment. Dry drought conditions saw it grow rapidly and it soon began threatening the town of Wakefield, forcing a major evacuation of its three thousand residents .

It was declared to be under control on 6 March and by 8 July had been deemed to be "well and truly under control," but was thought to be likely still smoldering in places after having been left to burn itself out.

== History ==
On 6 February 2019, a state of emergency was declared in the Tasman region due to the fire in Pigeon Valley.

By 9 February, the Pigeon Valley fire was being described as the country's largest since 1955. With 22 helicopters involved, it is New Zealand's largest aerial firefight on record. The fire caused 3,000 people from Wakefield and hundreds from surrounding areas to evacuate their homes and destroyed one house.

On 17 February, a helicopter crashed while fighting the fire in Tasman district, injuring the pilot.

The state of emergency declared on 6 February was extended for another seven days on 19 February.

The final group of roughly 230 residents evacuated from the Pigeon Valley fire near Wakefield were permitted to return to their homes on 21 February. The fire was not completely extinguished and their return was on the understanding that they could be required to leave again at short notice.

With the state of emergency lifted, work continued on 28 February to put out the fire completely, which it was feared might take weeks or months with conditions "bone dry".

On 6 March 2019, Nelson Tasman Emergency Management Group posted that the Pigeon Valley fire was "controlled" and residents were no longer required to be ready to evacuate. The emergency management group defined a controlled fire as "one that is extinguished around the perimeter and is not moving...[with] a 100 metre cold zone."

== Evacuation ==
The disaster forced almost 3,000 people to evacuate from areas at risk. The evacuation investigation carried out by a team from Massey University, the University of Canterbury, and NIST funded by FENZ shows that 96% of the householders complied with the evacuation order. The householders, who decided to stay, did it protect their property, do their job, take care of pets/livestock, or they did not believe their properties were at risk.

== Inquiry ==
A report by the Australasian Fire and Emergency Services Authorities Council, released on 30 October 2019, recommended a nationally consistent framework for tactical fire planning, and a list of 12 recommendations.

== Animal welfare response ==
On 6 February, HUHA founder Carolyn Press-McKenzie arrived in Nelson to set up an animal welfare shelter at the Richmond Showgrounds. By 8 February the temporary animal shelter was able to hold 956 animals, providing for companion animals, stock and injured wildlife amid growing public concern over animals trapped behind fire cordons.

Huha was joined by groups of volunteers, veterinarians and specialist organisations under the Ministry of Primary Industries (MPI) at the shelter, including SPCA's VERT team, the national rescue team (NRT), Federated Farmers, Animal Evac NZ and others. MPI, as the lead agency for animal welfare in disasters in New Zealand, also provided a team of vets and animal officers who carried out animal welfare checks.

A 16 person animal disaster response team were deployed by non-profit organisation, Animal Evac New Zealand on 9 February 2019 to the Richmond showground. The team included vet nurses, animal management officers and former SPCA inspectors as well as animal disaster and rescue experts and assisted MPI in recording the location of at risk companion animals and supporting owners at the Saxton welfare centre. Limited initial farm rescues were also carried out at the request of local farmers and with permission of MPI and the New Zealand Police.

Animal casualties included 40 plus sheep which were euthanised after being unable to escape from a fenced enclosure during the fire and badly burnt.

Volunteer organisations received widespread praise for their response from government agencies involved and the local residents.

== See also ==
- 2019 in New Zealand
- List of fires
