= Sleeper Lakes Fire =

2007 wildfire in Michigan, United States

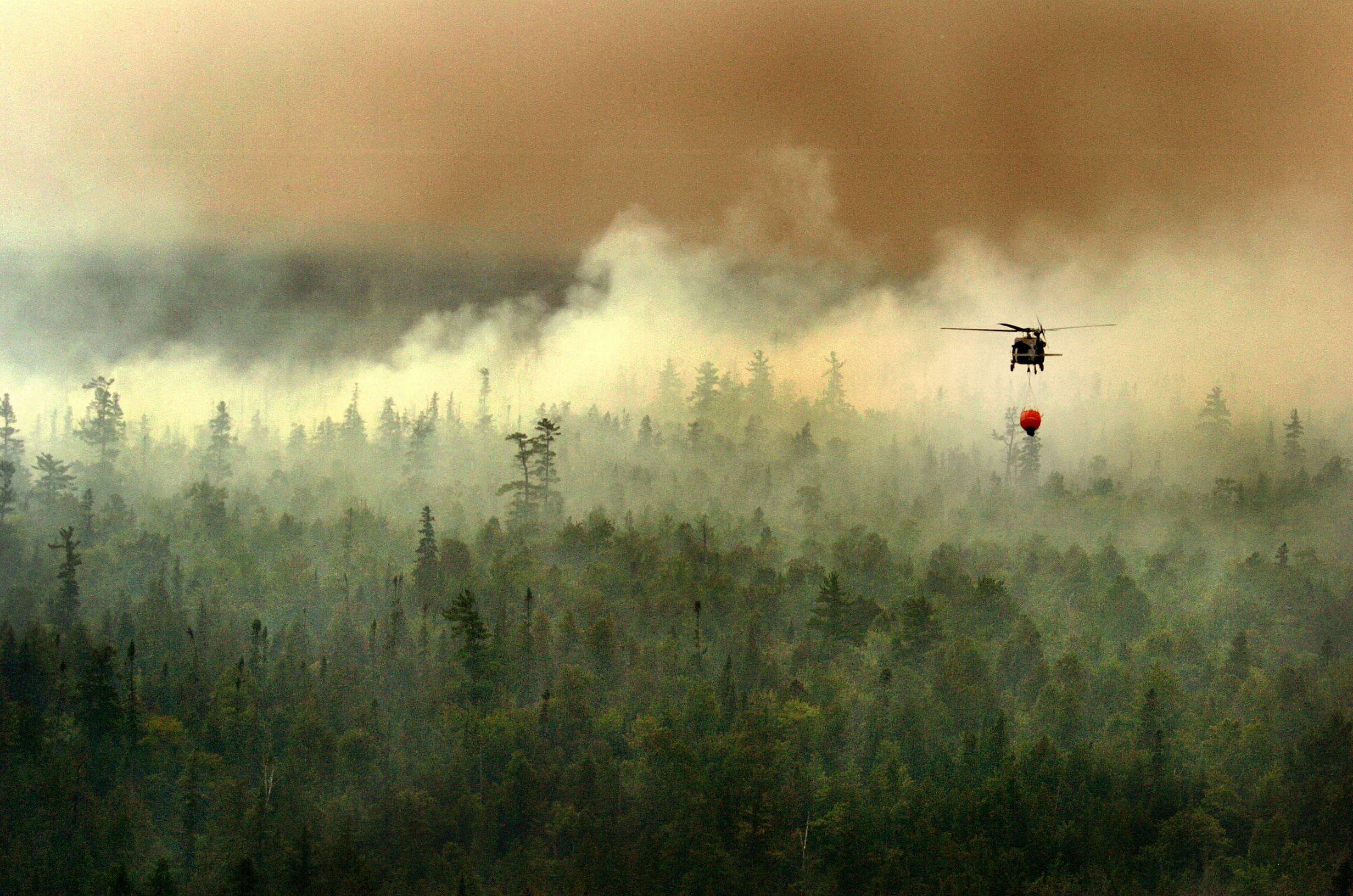
- Sleeper Lakes Fire, August 7, 2007, the Michigan National Guard was called out for firefighting duty.
- Date: August 2, 2007 — August 13, 2007
- Location: Newberry, Michigan, United States
- Coordinates: 46.49291°N 85.52567°W

Statistics
- Burned area: 18,500 acres (75 km^{2})

Ignition
- Cause: Lightning strike

Map
- Location within Michigan

The Sleeper Lake Fire was a wildfire that occurred north of the Village of Newberry in Luce County, Michigan. The fire most likely started with a lightning strike on August 2, 2007 near Sleeper Lake.

== Fire progression ==
The fire began in the vicinity of Sleeper Lake and burned towards the southeast over largely uninhabited marsh and bogs. By August 5, 2007, southeasterly winds began to push the fire towards the north, threatening structures and forcing nearby residents to evacuate. By that point, the fire had burned an estimated 12,000 acres (49 km^{2}). By August 13, the burned area had increased to 18,500 acres (75 km^{2}).

== Resources ==
Several agencies cooperated in fighting the fire and providing emergency services, including the Michigan DNR, the Minnesota DNR, the Wisconsin DNR, the Bureau of Indian Affairs, the US Fish and Wildlife Service, the US Forest Service, the Ontario Ministry of Natural Resources, the Michigan National Guard, Air Guard, the Michigan State Police, Luce County Sheriff's Department, the National Weather Service, the Nature Conservancy, area volunteer fire departments, the Salvation Army, and the American Red Cross. 239 persons were involved, manning bulldozers, five helicopters and a water bomber.

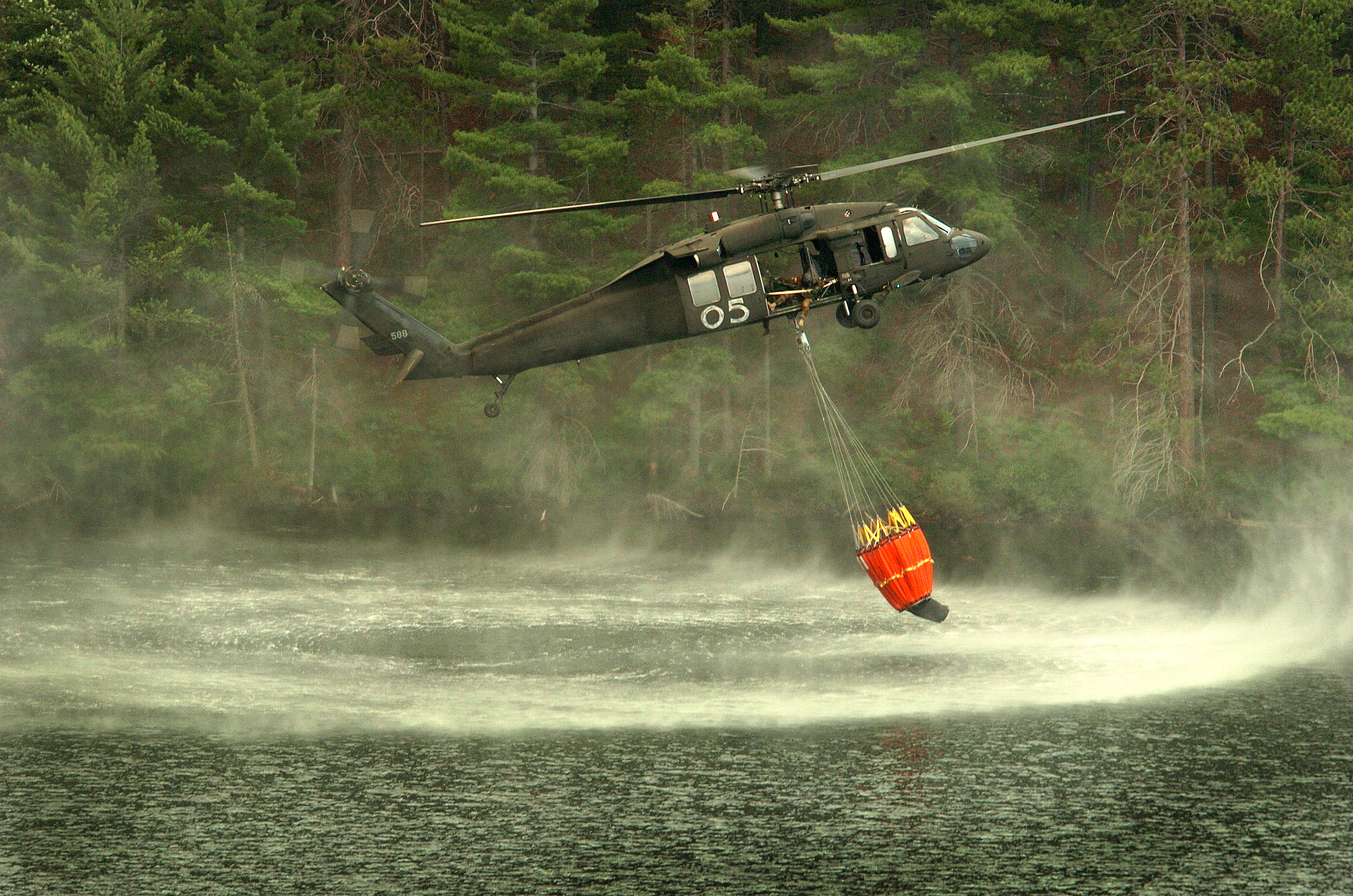
Bambi buckets dipped in local lakes provided water to suppress the fire.

== See also ==
- List of Michigan wildfires
