= Thumb Fire =

1881 wildfire in Michigan, United States

Coordinates: 43.8°N 83.0°W

The Thumb Fire took place on September 5, 1881, in the Thumb area of Michigan in the United States. The fire, which burned over a million acres (4,000 km^{2}) in less than a day, was the consequence of drought, hurricane-force winds, heat, after-effects of the Port Huron Fire of 1871, and ecological damage wrought by the era's logging techniques. The blaze, also called the Great Thumb Fire, the Great Forest Fire of 1881 and the Huron Fire, killed 282 people in Sanilac, Lapeer, Tuscola and Huron counties. The damage estimate was $2,347,000 in 1881, equivalent to $78,300,776 when adjusted for inflation. The fire emitted enough soot and ash into the atmosphere to partially obscure sunlight at many locations on the East Coast of the United States. In New England cities, the sky appeared yellow and projected a strange luminosity onto buildings and vegetation. Twilight appeared at 12 noon. September 6, 1881, became known as Yellow Tuesday or Yellow Day because of the ominous nature of this atmospheric event.

== History ==
August and the first days of September 1881 were hotter than usual, and the Thumb had suffered a rain deficit since April; in Thornville, this period was the driest registered up to 1969. There were forest fires beginning in mid-August, and on August 31, a fire started in northern Lapeer County. It destroyed several buildings in Sandusky and Deckerville in nearby Sanilac County. On Monday, September 5, the town of Bad Axe, in Huron County, burst into flames. Winds spread the fire to Huron City and Grindstone City. The fire continued to spread through Tuesday and Wednesday, September 6 and 7, consuming most of Huron, Tuscola, Sanilac and Lapeer counties.

== Relief aid ==
In 1881 Clara Barton, at the age of 60, founded the American Red Cross. The organization's first official disaster relief operation was its response to the Michigan "Thumb Fire" of 1881. The Red Cross provided money, clothes and household items. The fire caused more than 14,000 people to be dependent on public aid. It also destroyed over 2,000 barns, dwellings, and schools.

== Fire protection ==
After the fires of 1881, people started to organize firefighting plans. By the 1900s the timber barons were suffering huge losses from forest fires, so they developed the Northern Forest and Protection Association to manage forest fires in Michigan; it was superseded by the U.S. Forest Service. However, the Ford Motor Company, which owned large areas of forest, had already established serious conservation and cleanup methods, along with maintaining their own fire towers and timber patrols, in order to discover fires soon after their start. The early settlers used bucket brigades to protect their houses and barns, but they were no match for the raging fires. In 1917, Michigan purchased its first tractor for firefighting.

== See also ==
- List of Michigan wildfires
- Peshtigo Fire
- Great Chicago Fire
- Great Michigan Fire of 1871
- Great Hinckley Fire

== Sources ==
- “Clara Barton: Founder of the American Red Cross”. American Red Cross Museum. Oct. 12, 2007 <http://www.redcross.org/museum/history/ClaraBarton.asp>
- Haines, Donald A., & Sando, Rodney W., 1969: Climatic Conditions Preceding Historical Great Fires in the North Central Region. North Central Experimentation Forest Service; US Department of Agriculture.
- Nesbit, Joanne. “Michigan History Series”. U-M News and Information Services.Aug. 29, 1996. Oct. 10, 2007 <E-mail:mjnesbit@umich.edu>
- Sodders, Betty (1997). Michigan on Fire. Thunder Bay Press.
