= Peshtigo fire =

1871 forest fire that destroyed Peshtigo, Wisconsin, US

- The ruins of Peshtigo and the surrounding landscape after the fires
- Date: October 8, 1871; 155 years ago
- Location: Peshtigo, Wisconsin
- Coordinates: 45.05°N 87.75°W

Statistics
- Burned area: 1,200,000 acres (490,000 ha)
- Land use: Logging Industry

Impacts
- Deaths: 1,200–2,500 (estimated)
- Cost: In excess of $5 million (estimated)

Ignition
- Cause: Small embers from slash and burn agriculture were caught up in drafts from unusually high winds during a period of extremely dry drought-like conditions.

Map
- Location within Wisconsin Location within the United States

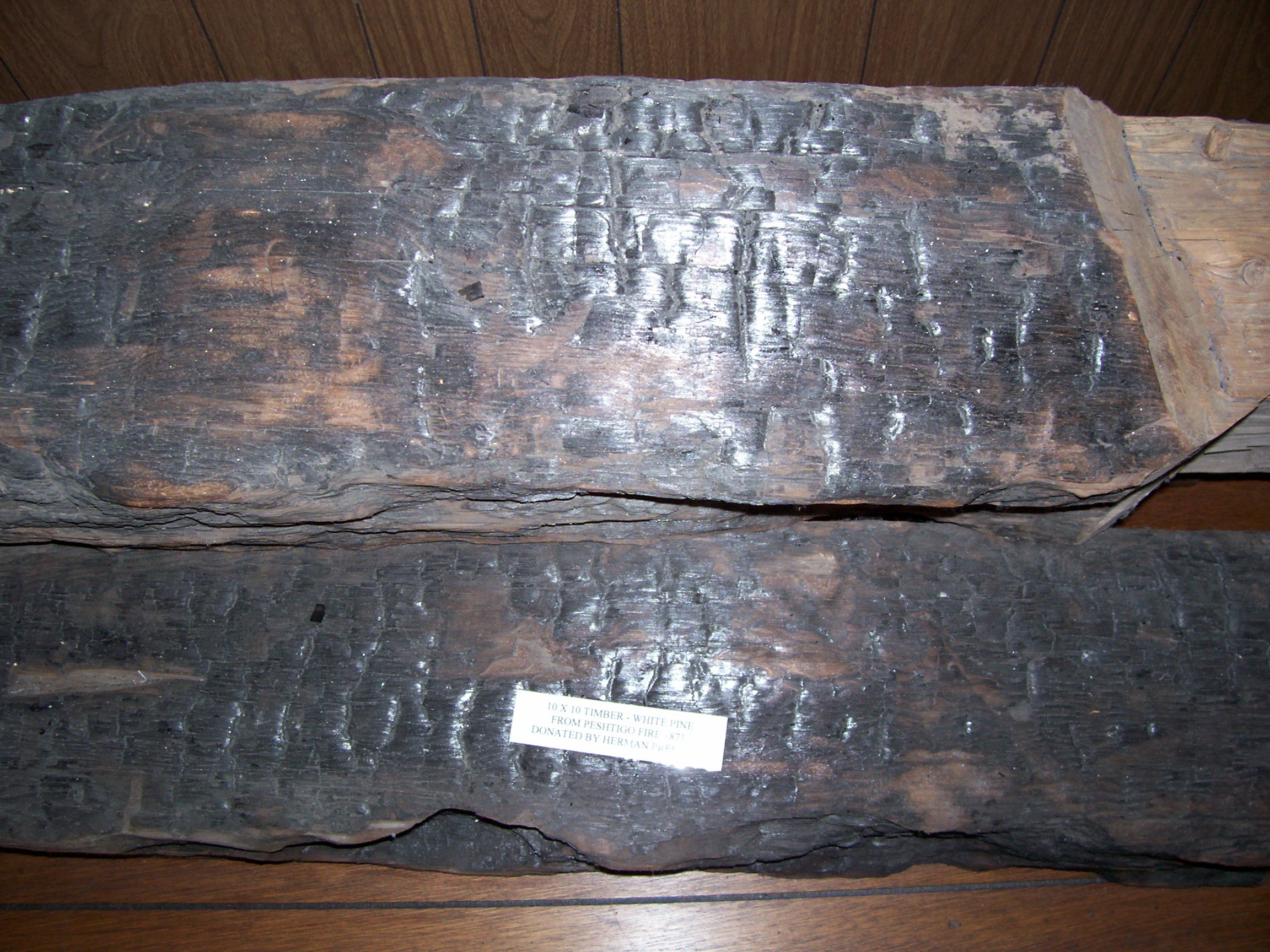
Two pieces of lumber that survived the fire

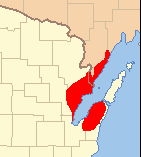
The total extent of damage from the fires

The Peshtigo Fire was a wildfire on October 8, 1871, in northeastern Wisconsin, United States, including much of the southern half of the Door Peninsula and adjacent parts of the Upper Peninsula of Michigan. The largest community in the affected area was Peshtigo, Wisconsin, which had a population of approximately 1,700 residents. The fire burned about 1.2 million acres (490,000 ha) and is the deadliest wildfire in recorded history, with the number of deaths estimated between 1,500 and 2,500. The exact number of deaths is debated. Data from mass graves, both those already exhumed and those still being discovered, show that the death toll of the blaze was most likely greater than the 1889 Johnstown flood death toll of 2,200 people or more.

Occurring on the same day as the more famous Great Chicago Fire, the Peshtigo fire has been largely forgotten, even though it killed at least five times as many people.

Several cities in Michigan, including Holland and Manistee (across Lake Michigan from Peshtigo) and Port Huron (at the southern end of Lake Huron), also had major fires on the same day. These fires, and many other fires of the 19th century, had the same basic causes: small fires coupled with unusually dry weather.

== Firestorm ==
Slash-and-burn land management was a common way to clear forest for farming and railroad construction. On the day of the Peshtigo fire, an eastward-moving cold front increased the wind speed and several slash-and-burn fires merged.

A firestorm ensued. In the words of Gess and Lutz, in a firestorm "superheated flames of at least 2,000 degrees Fahrenheit ... advance on winds of 110 miles per hour or stronger. The diameter of such a fire ranges from one thousand to ten thousand feet ... When a firestorm erupts in a forest, it is a blowup, nature's nuclear explosion ... "

By the time it was over, between 1.2 and 1.5 million acres of land had been burned. In addition to Peshtigo, 16 other communities were destroyed in the fire.

The value of the property and forest that was destroyed in the fire was estimated to be about $5 million US (about $134 million in 2025 dollars). Additionally, 2,000,000 trees, saplings, and animals perished in the fire; this had a devastating economic impact on the area as well.

An accurate death toll has never been determined because all local records were destroyed in the fire. Estimates vary from 1,200 to 2,400 deaths.

The 1873 Report to the Wisconsin Legislature listed 1,182 names of dead or missing residents. In 1870, the Town of Peshtigo had 1,749 residents. More than 350 bodies were buried in a mass grave, as there was no one left to identify them.

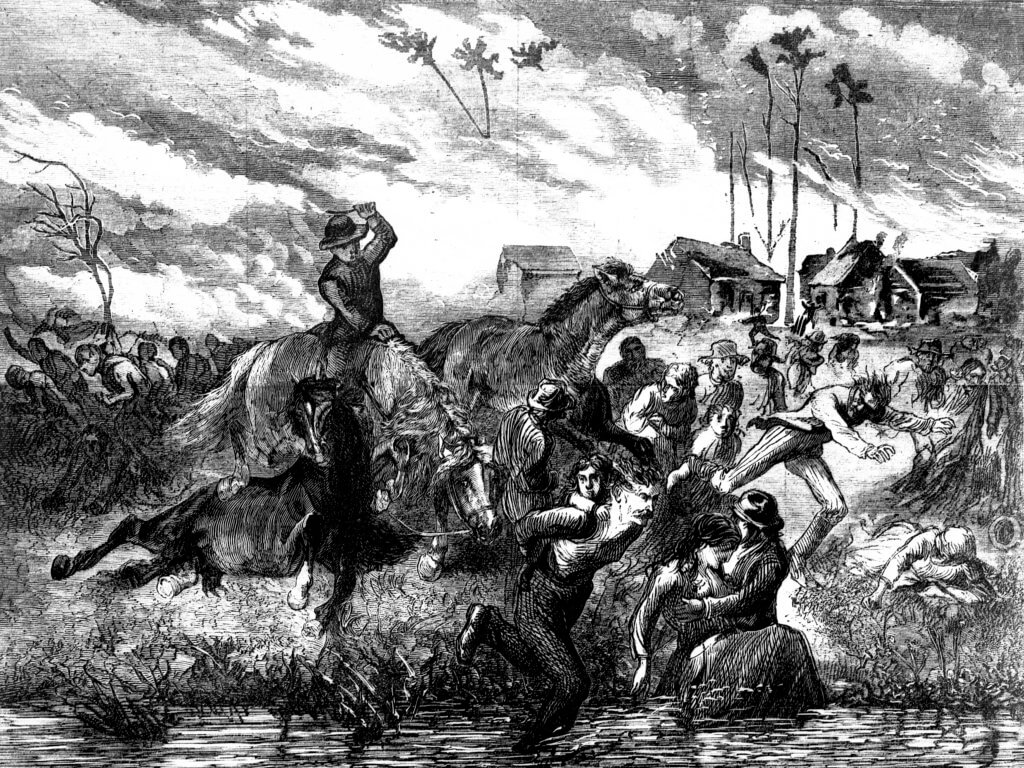
Making for the river

The Rev. Peter Pernin, in his eyewitness account, states that the prolonged drought at that time combined with the factor of human carelessness were omens of the horrible disaster. He also notes how the fire seemed to jump across the Peshtigo River using the bridges and upward air drafts and burn both sides of the town.

Other survivors reported that the firestorm generated a fire whirl (described as a tornado) that threw rail cars and houses into the air. Many citizens escaped the flames by immersing themselves in the Peshtigo River, wells, or other nearby bodies of water. Some drowned while others succumbed to hypothermia in the frigid river. In one account, a man slit the throats of all his children to spare them from an agonizing death.

At the same time, another fire burned parts of the Door Peninsula; because of the coincidence, some incorrectly assumed that the Peshtigo fire had jumped across the waters of Green Bay into the Door County regions. However, the fire did not jump across the bay. Most likely, the firestorm spread and created a new ground fire in New Franken which then spread and burned everything northward up until Sturgeon Bay.

== Comet hypothesis ==
Speculation since 1883 has suggested that the start of the Peshtigo and Chicago fires on the same day was not coincidental, but that all the major fires in Illinois, Michigan and Wisconsin that day were caused by impact of fragments from Biela's Comet. This hypothesis was revived in a 1985 book, reviewed in a 1997 documentary, and investigated in a 2004 paper published by the American Institute of Aeronautics and Astronautics.

Certain behaviors of the Chicago and Peshtigo fires were cited to support the idea of an extraterrestrial cause, such as blue flames (thought to be cometary gases burning) in the basements of houses. However, modern fire theory indicates that the blue color was most likely a product of burning carbon monoxide in the poorly ventilated basements. Additionally, scientists with expertise in the field pointed out that there has never been a credible report of a fire being started by a meteorite.

In any event, no external source of ignition was needed. There were already many small fires burning in the area as part of land-clearing operations and similar activities after a tinder-dry summer. All that was necessary to trigger the firestorm, plus the other large fires in the Midwest, was a strong wind from the weather front which had moved in that evening.

== Legacy and aftermath ==
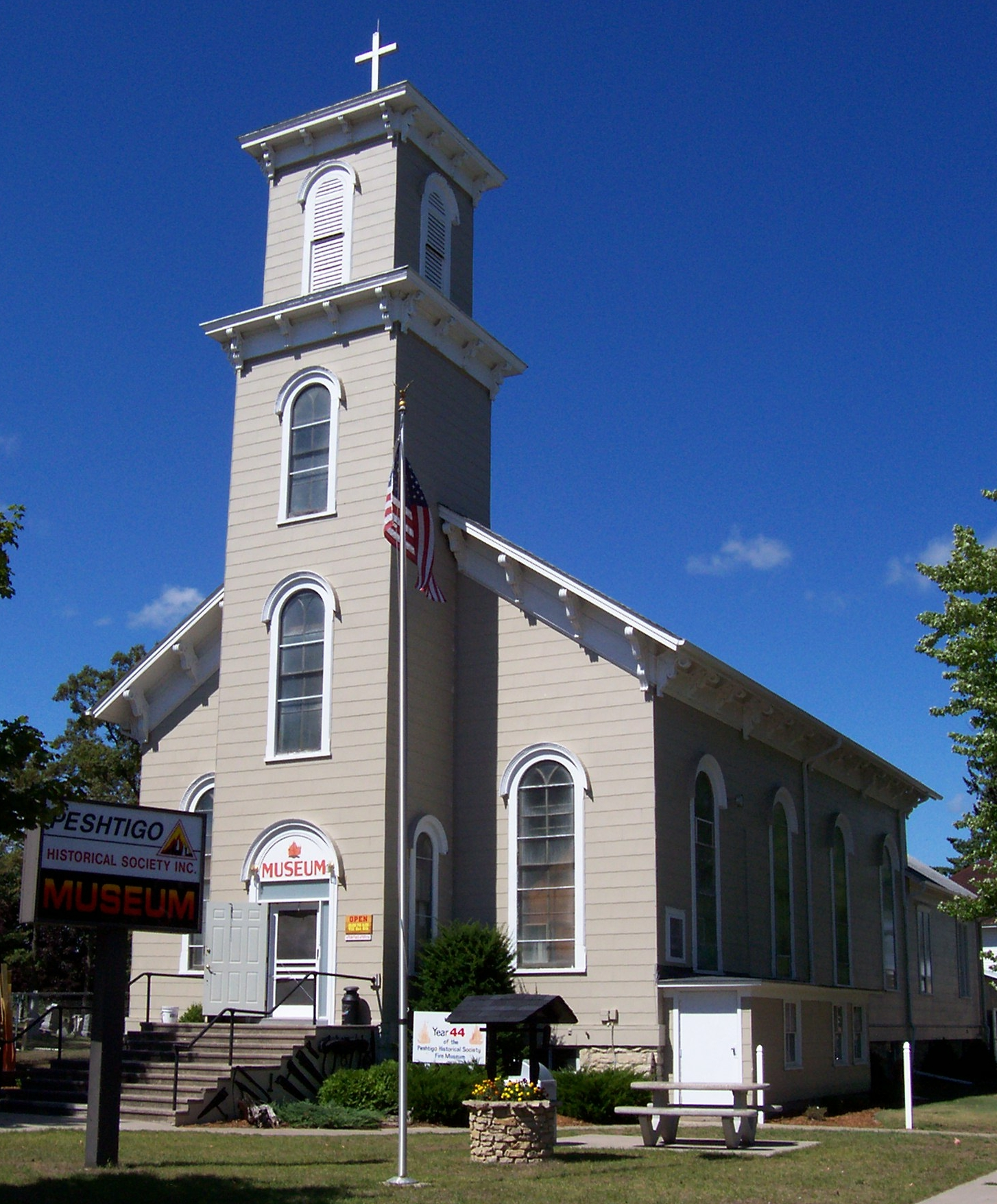
Peshtigo Fire Museum

The wildfire remains the deadliest in the history of the United States.

William B. Ogden, a politician and owner of the factories in Peshtigo, returned to rebuild the town. However, progress was slow and many buildings, including the woodenware factory, never reopened. Today, Peshtigo has roughly 3,500 residents.

The Peshtigo Fire Museum, just west of U.S. Highway 41, has a small collection of fire artifacts, first-person accounts, and a graveyard dedicated to victims of the tragedy. A memorial commemorating the fire was dedicated on October 8, 2012, at the bridge over the Peshtigo River.

The Peshtigo Fire Cemetery was entered into the National Register of Historic Places.

The National Shrine of Our Lady of Good Help, a Marian shrine in Champion, was established at the site of a chapel where Sister Adele Brise and others sheltered from the fire and survived.

Tornado Memorial County Park is located on the site of the former community of Williamsonville, a small village in Door County, and is named for the fire whirl which occurred there. Out of 76 residents, only 19 survived, and Williamsonville was never rebuilt.

The combination of topography, geography, wind conditions, and ignition sources that led to the fire is known as the "Peshtigo paradigm". The American and British militaries studied the fire during World War II to learn how to recreate firestorms during bombing campaigns against cities in Germany and Japan. Denise Gess, co-author of Firestorm at Peshtigo, said, "They actually made a 'demo' first, a little scale model of wooden buildings, and studied how you would drop bombs until it created a firestorm. Something that devastating and that hot."

Rutkow (2012) writes that the event prompted almost no change to the practices of the lumber industry or the way settlers approached life in forests. He notes that in the following decades, the rate of industrial logging increased and the amount of forest fires increased throughout the country, with Wisconsin itself experiencing major fires in 1880, 1891, 1894, 1897, 1908, 1910, 1923, 1931, and 1936. The loss of half a million acres a year was not uncommon.

== See also ==
- Other Great Fires of 1871:
  - Great Chicago Fire
  - Great Michigan Fire
  - Port Huron Fire of 1871
- Other fire disasters in the Great Lakes
  - Great Hinckley Fire of 1894
  - Baudette fire of 1910
  - Cloquet fire of 1918
  - Thumb Fire of 1881 (see also List of Michigan wildfires)
