= Port Huron Fire of 1871 =

Historic event

- Date: October 8, 1871
- Location: Port Huron, Michigan
- Coordinates: 42°58′49″N 82°26′15″W

Statistics
- Total area: 1,200,000 acres (4,900 km^{2})

Impacts
- Deaths: At Least 50

Ignition
- Cause: Unknown

Map
- Location within Michigan Location within the United States

The Port Huron Fire of October 8, 1871 (one of a series of fires known collectively as the Great Fire of 1871 or the Great Michigan Fire) burned a number of cities including White Rock and Port Huron, and much of the countryside in the "Thumb" region of the U.S. state of Michigan (a total of 1.2 million acres, or 4,850 km²).

On the same day, other fires burned the cities of Holland and Manistee, Michigan, as well as broad swaths of forest in various areas of the state; the Great Chicago Fire and the Peshtigo Fire also occurred on the same day. At least 50 people died as a result of the Port Huron Fire, and at least 200 from all the fires in the state.

== Origins ==
The origins of the fires are unknown, but the damage was worsened by a number of factors. Uninterrupted drought had plagued the Midwest into early October and winds were strong. When the wind increased and shifted direction, fire fighters were unable to control the flames any longer. Vast tracts of forest burned for a week in parts of Michigan and Wisconsin. Within hours, several Midwestern cities and towns were reduced to charcoal and ash.

== Contemporary fires ==
That same night, the Great Chicago Fire erupted in Illinois, and the Peshtigo Fire burned a large tract in Wisconsin, including the city of Peshtigo.

Windsor, Ontario met a similar fate four days later. Much of the area burned by the Port Huron Fire of 1871 was swept by another deadly conflagration ten years later, under similar conditions.

== See also ==
- List of Michigan wildfires
