= Great Michigan Fire =

1871 series of wildfires throughout Michigan, United States

The Great Michigan Fire was a series of simultaneous forest fires in the state of Michigan in the United States in 1871. They were possibly caused (or at least reinforced) by the same winds that fanned the Great Chicago Fire, the Peshtigo Fire and the Port Huron Fire; some believe lightning or even meteor showers may have started the fires. Several cities, towns and villages, including Alpena, Holland, Manistee, and Port Huron, suffered serious damage or were lost. The concurrent Peshtigo Fire in Wisconsin also destroyed several towns in the Upper Peninsula of Michigan. In 1881, much more than half of "the Thumb" region was burned over by the Thumb Fire, which followed part of the same path as the 1871 fires.

== Origins ==
In the mid-1830s logging began in Michigan and grew into a significant industry. Michigan was extensively logged for the Eastern white pine, measuring 150 feet (46 m) tall and exceeding 5 feet (2 m) in diameter, along with the hardwood forests. By 1854, sixteen sawmills were in operation, producing over 13,000,000 board feet (30,000 m^{3}) of lumber. These operations left behind branches, bark and quantities of unused wood.

The fires of October 8, 1871, started after a long dry summer. This was the same day as the Great Chicago Fire and the Peshtigo Fire in Wisconsin. Most areas had had no rain in months, making the dried-up vegetation and logging debris, known as "slash", fuel for the fires. These fires were the result of hundreds of smaller land-clearing fires whipped together to form a massive wall of flames by gale force winds.

== Consequences ==
In addition to the fires originating in Michigan, the Peshtigo firestorm in Wisconsin crossed the Menominee River and burned in Menominee County, Michigan. More than 3,900 square miles (2,500,000 acres; 1,000,000 ha) were burned in Michigan, including the Menominee County area. Not only was the land burnt and left barren, thousands of buildings (houses, barns, stores and mills) were destroyed with no lumber left to rebuild. Hundreds of families were left homeless. The extent of property loss, animal deaths, and forest devastation has never been determined.

Also unknown is the total number of human deaths. Some estimates put the loss of life at fewer than 500, but they were largely based on families reporting their members missing. In 1871 in Michigan there were hundreds to thousands of lumberjacks and salesmen spread out across the state, along with settlers in remote areas, making it impossible to know the total death toll. Because the Michigan fires occurred during the day, the estimate of the death toll is lower than the Great Chicago Fire's estimated 250–300 dead.

== Comet hypothesis ==
One speculation, first suggested in 1883, is that the simultaneous fires across the Midwest were caused by the impact of fragments from Comet Biela. The theory was revived in a 1985 book and investigated in a 2004 paper to the American Institute of Aeronautics and Astronautics. The key hypothesis is that methane from the comet provided the fuel for fires across the region to flare out of control.

Others dispute this theory, arguing that meteorites in fact are cold to the touch when they reach the Earth's surface, and there are no credible reports of any fire anywhere having been started by a meteorite. Various aspects of the behaviors of the Chicago and Peshtigo fires attributed to extraterrestrial intervention have more mundane explanations. No external source of ignition was needed; numerous small fires were already burning in the area after a tinder-dry summer and all that was needed to generate the massive blazes in the Midwest were the winds from the front that moved in that evening.

== See also ==
- List of Michigan wildfires
- Port Huron Fire of 1871
- Peshtigo Fire of 1871
- Great Chicago Fire of 1871
- Thumb Fire of 1881
- Great Hinckley Fire of 1894
- 1918 Cloquet Fire
