= Fires in Edo =

Frequent fires in the Japanese city

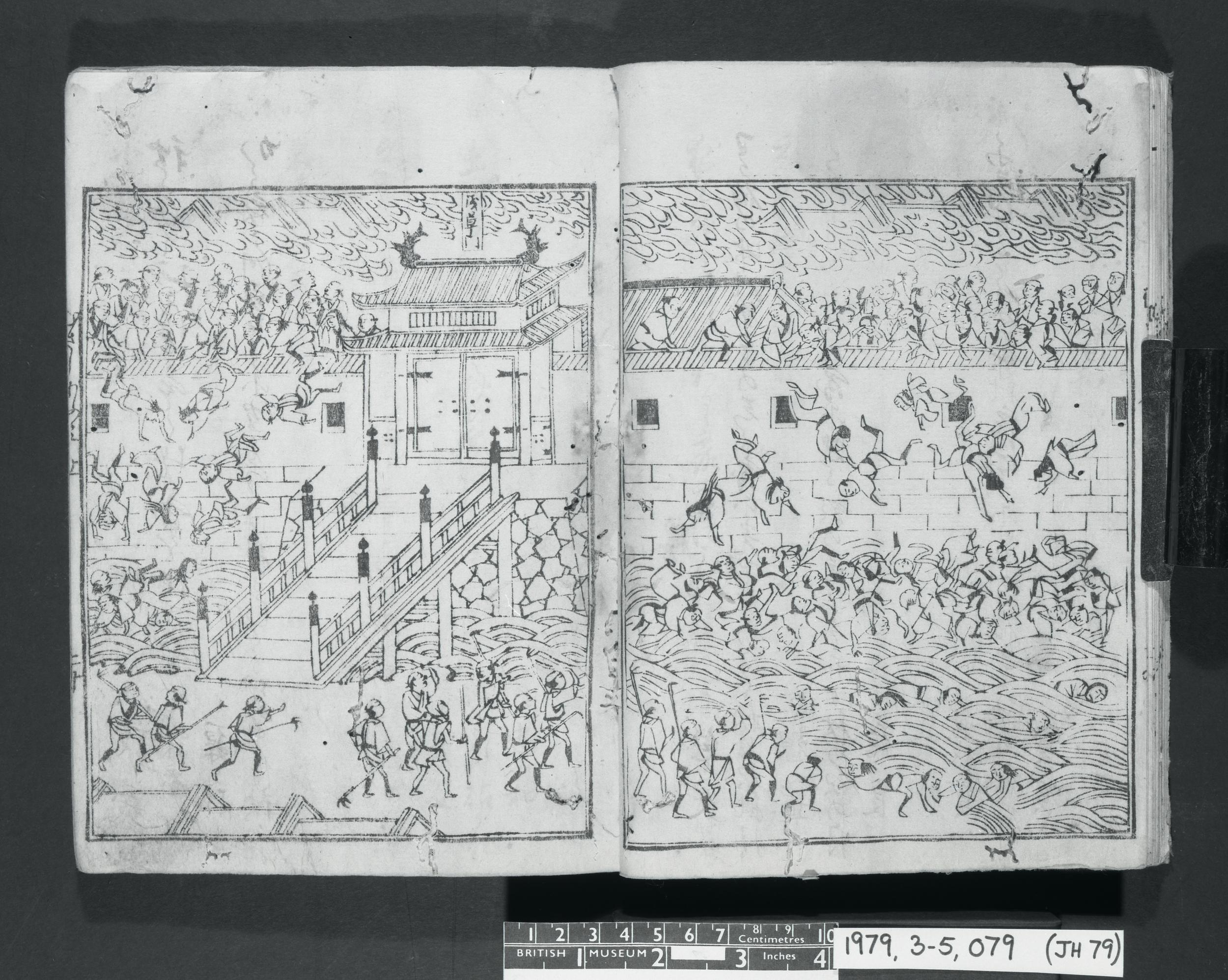
Asakusa-mon (浅草門; Asakusa Gate) during the Great Fire of Meireki as depicted in Musashiabumi (むさしあぶみ), a kanazōshi (仮名草子) by Asai Ryōi (浅井 了意). Officials mistook released ex-convicts for prison escapees and shut the gate. People seeking refuge had no choice but to climb the city walls, only to fall into the canal below.

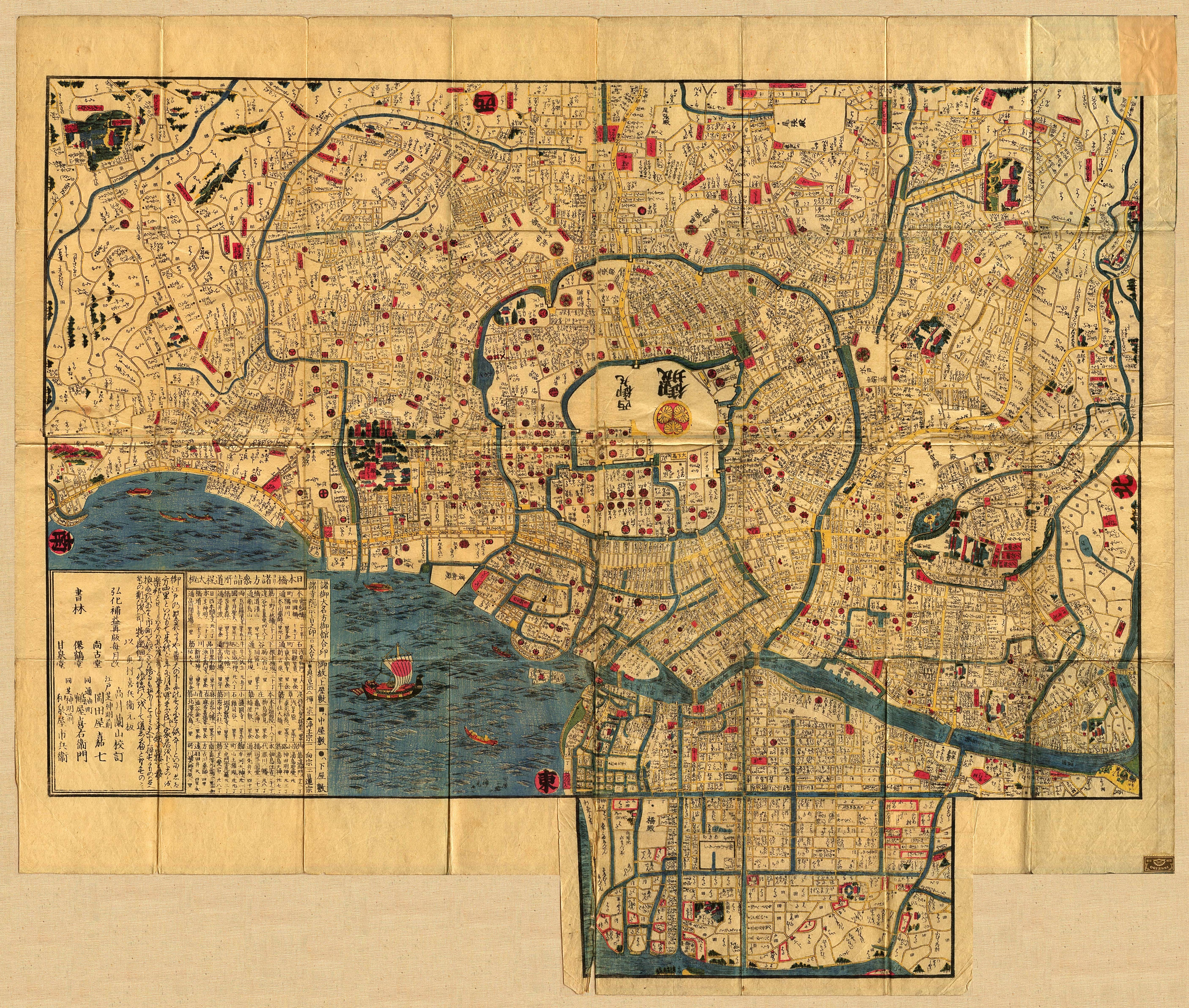
Map of Edo as of the 1840s. The Sumida River is found in the lower right.

Fires in Edo (江戸), the former name of Tokyo, during the Edo period (1600−1868) of Japan were so frequent that the city of Edo was characterized as the saying "Fires and quarrels are the flowers of Edo" (Note: 「火事と喧嘩は江戸の華」) goes. Even in the modern days, the old Edo was still remembered as the "City of Fires" (火災都市).

Edo was something of a rarity in the world, as vast urban areas of the city were repeatedly leveled by fire. The great fires of Edo were compared to the gods of fire Shukuyū (祝融) and Kairoku (回禄), and also humorously described as "autumn leaves".

== Frequency of fires ==
During the 267 years between 1601 (Keichō 6), the year after the Battle of Sekigahara (関ヶ原の戦い), and 1867 (Keiō 3), the year of Taisei Hōkan (大政奉還; "return of sovereignty"), Edo was struck by 49 great fires. In comparison, during the same period, great fires in Kyoto, Osaka and Kanazawa totaled only nine, six, and three, respectively, which made Edo's figure stand out among the metropolises in Japan. According to other accounts, there were more than 85 major fires during the history of Edo. Between 1600 and 1945, Edo/Tokyo was leveled every 25–50 years or so by fire, earthquakes, tsunami, volcanic eruptions, and war.

If smaller fires are also included, of the 1,798 fires that occurred in this 267 year-span, 269 were in 1601–1700, 541 in 1701–1800, and 986 in 1801–1867. As Edo's population in the late Tokugawa period increased in tandem with its growing economic prosperity, so too did the frequency of fires in the city increase proportionally to its growth. In particular, the 17 years between 1851 (Kaei 3) and 1867 saw 506 fires, to which unstable public order caused by the incapable administration of the Tokugawa shogunate was a major contributing factor.

== List of great fires ==
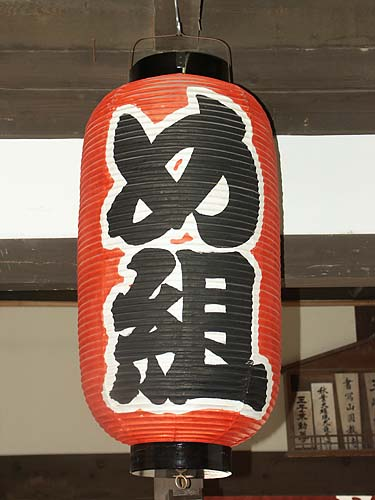
Abarenbō Shōgun (暴れん坊将軍) was a program broadcast from 1978 through 2003 on TV Asahi, a Japanese television network. This red lantern is a symbol of the Megumi firefighters who played a recurring role in this Edo period drama.

The following representative table lists some great fires in the history of Edo that caused catastrophic losses of life and material damage. The three that occurred in the eras of Meireki, Meiwa and Bunka were called the Three Great Fires of Edo (江戸三大大火). The Great Fire of Meireki in 1657 is considered to have been the most disastrous of the three conflagrations. Fires in Edo often quickly escalated, in large part due to the city's urban environment being characterized by inflammable wooden machiya buildings that were heated by charcoal-burning fireplaces. Given the limitations of firefighting technology at the time as well as the unreliability of Edo's water supply system, once a blaze in a neighborhood crammed with wooden building stock got out of hand there was little authorities could do to prevent its spread to other parts of the city. Apart from the great conflagrations, there were also intermittent small fires in this period that (taken together) caused greater damage and loss of life in Edo than any of the more singularly destructive blazes.

Representative great fires in Edo
Date		Name		Casualties		Damages			
Gregorian	Japanese (year/month/day)	English	Japanese	Killed	Missing	Towns	Samurai houses	Temples & shrines	Chōnin houses
December 26, 1601	6 Keicho/11ic/2	(Note: First recorded great fire in Edo. The entire city was burned down.)							
March 10or11, 1641	18 Kan-ei/1/29or30	Oke-machi Fire (Note: Daimyō hikeshi (大名火消; daimyō firefighting teams) were established after this fire.)	桶町火事	400+		97	123		
March 2–3, 1657	3 Meireki/1/18–19	Great Fire of Meireki (Note: Also called the Fire of Furisode (振袖火事). It was the worst fire in the history of Edo. Over half of Edo was involved in the conflagration that had begun on March, 2, 1657, the third year of the Meireki era. During its two-day span the awesome conflagration reduced 60-70% of the capital city to ashes and burnt down Edo Castle's Tenshu Keep. The great fire would have significant long-term impact on the urban planning and firefighting system of Edo. (Meireki 3, 18th–19th days of the 1st month); and the city was devastated, claiming over 100,000 lives.)	明暦の大火	Up to 107,000					
January 25, 1683	2 Tenna/12/28	Great Fire of Tenna (Note: Also called the Fire of Yaoya Oshichi (八百屋お七の火事). See below.)	天和の大火	830–3500			241	95	
October 9, 1698	11 Genroku/9/6	Chokugaku Fire	勅額火事	3000		326	308	232	18,700
December 25, 1704	16 Genroku/11/29	Mito-sama Fire (Note: Compounding the damaged inflicted on Edo by the earthquake six days earlier, the area of destruction exceeded that of the Great Fire of Meireki.)	水戸様火事				275	75	20,000
March 14, 1745	2 Enkyo/2/12	Rokudō Fire	六道火事	1323			28,678		
March 22, 1760	10 Horeki/2/6	Hōreki Fire	宝暦の大火			460		80	
April 1, 1772	9 Meiwa/2/29	Great Meiwa fire (Note: The fire broke out on February 29, 1772 (Meiwa 9, 26th day or the 1st month). This is considered one of the three greatest Edo Fires. Unofficial reports describe a swath of ashes and cinders nearly 5 miles (8.0 km) width and 15 miles (24 km) length—destroying 178 temples and shrines, 127 daimyo residences, 878 non-official residences, 8705 houses of bannermen, and 628 blocks of merchant dwellings, with estimates of over 6,000 casualties. All this devastation subsequently engendered the staggering costs of reconstruction.)	明和の大火	14,700	4060	904			
April 22, 1806	3 Bunka/3/4	Great Bunka fire (Note: a severe fire which broke out in Edo during the third year of the Bunka era.)	文化の大火	1200		530	80	80	
April 24, 1829	12 Bunsei/3/21	Great Fire of Bunsei	文政の大火	2800			370,000		
March 16, 1834	5 Tempo/2/7	Kōgo Fire (Note: Series of fire incidents lasted for six days.)	甲午火事	4000					
March 2, 1845	2 Koka/1/24	Aoyama Fire	青山火事	800–900		126	400	5000	
November 11, 1855	2 Ansei/10/2	Earthquake Fire (Note: A magnitude 7.0 earthquake struck Edo on the same day and caused fires in numerous locations that evolved into this great fire.)	地震火事	4500–26,000					

=== Others ===
- 1668 : A major fire broke out in Edo on March 3, 1668 (Kanbun 8, 1st day of the 2nd month). This disaster was attributed to arson; and the fire burned for 45 days.
- 1682 A significant fire burned controllably in the city on February 5, 1682 (Tenna 1, 28th day of the 12th month).
- 1697 (Genroku 10): This was called the fire of the tenth year of Genroku.

== Causes of fires ==
During the Edo period, fire was an indispensable element of daily life. It was used for cooking and lighting, which in turn gave rise to accidents. Arson, due to various motives, was another source of fires. Other reasons for a greater frequency of great fires in Edo compared to other cities included a dense urban layout housing a large population, existence of an impoverished social class, and Edo's unique meteorological conditions.

Matsunosuke Nishiyama, a scholar who studied Edo's fires, summarized the causes of the fires as:

- It is not unthinkable that in Edo, probably many residents simply rejoiced in the great fires;
- The lack of a unified political system in a metropolis like Edo was one of the causes of the frequent great fires;
- Edo's chōnin (町人; "townspeople"), considering the fires inevitable and their spreading unstoppable, would remain content as long as their own houses did not become origins of fires.

=== Growth of population ===
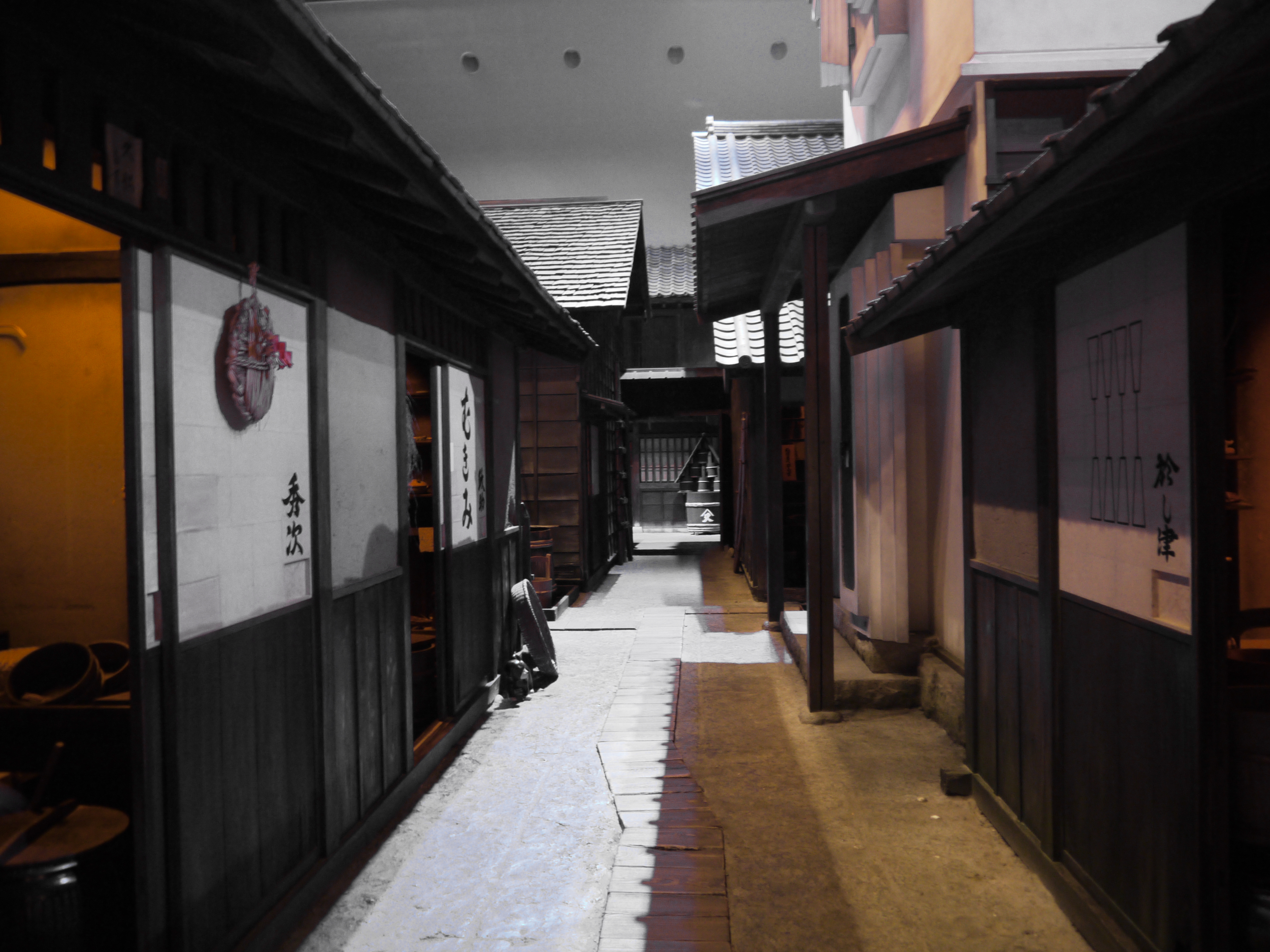
Replica of a nagaya in the Fukagawa Edo Museum

After Tokugawa Ieyasu (徳川 家康) established the shogunate in Edo, daimyōs (vassal lords) and hatamoto (senior retainers) residences were built around Edo Castle and housed a large number of samurai. Merchants and artisans who supported the life of the samurai soon migrated to Edo in flocks and resulted in a population boom. The population of Edo grew from roughly 400,000 in 1640 (Kan'ei 17) to around 800,000 in 1693 (Genroku 6), and grew to about 1,100,000 by 1721 (Kyōhō 6). In contrast to the vast residential areas of the samurai, chōnin were confined to much smaller areas. The growing population pushed their population density to an extremely high degree. Their residences were densely arranged in compact areas, and shabby nagaya (長屋; "long houses") were common. The per capita living space, kitchen and closet included, was usually the size of six tatami mats. On top of that, the wood and paper construction materials easily became fuel for a fire. All these conditions naturally led to a high possibility of fire accidents.

=== Arson ===
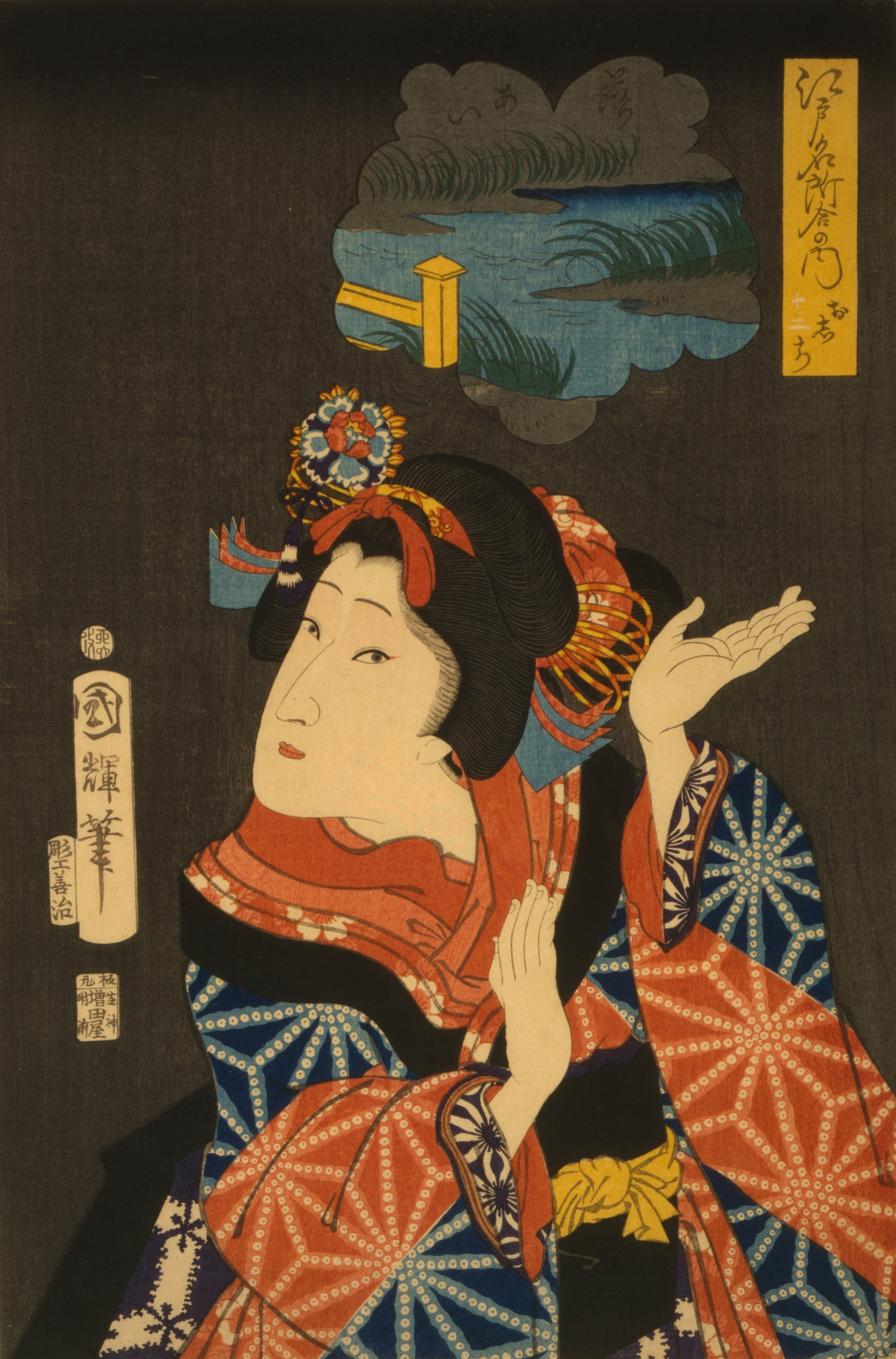
Color woodcut portrait of Yaoya Oshichi by Utagawa Kuniteru II (二世歌川 国輝) (1867)

As a major cause of fires in Edo, burglars were recorded in great numbers. Many of the arrested arsonists were living an impoverished life due to the high cost of living of Edo and ineligibility to work as indentured servants for not having a guarantor. Some of them had had their houses burned down and had little to lose from committing crimes. Among the 102 arsonists arrested in 1723 and 1724 (Kyōhō 8 and 9), 41 were hinin (非人; "outcast"), (Note: Hinin were the lowest, most discriminated rank in the caste system of the Edo society. Members were typically ex-convicts and vagrants.) and 22 had no registered permanent residences. Most of them came from the lower social classes. (Note: The number of arrested arsonists in those two years skyrocketed. It is possible that some of them were in fact innocent.)

Motivations for arson varied, though the most prominent one was looting. Arsonists of this kind would set fire on windy days and take advantage of the ensuing disturbances to commit theft. Other than looting, frequent motives were those arising from social relationships, such as servants seeking vengeance upon their masters and grudges due to failed romantic relations. Also recorded were instances of merchants setting fire to competitors' businesses and children playing with fire, and even a case with a confession of "suddenly felt like setting fire". Since a fire would also mean business for carpenters, plasterworkers and steeplejacks in the subsequent reconstruction, some of them would delight at the occurrence and aggravation of fires. In particular, as many firefighters primarily worked as steeplejacks, some of them would intentionally spread fire for the sake of showing off firefighting skills in public or creating business opportunities for themselves. This prompted the shogunate to issue warning ordinances and execute some offending firefighters. Arrested arsonists were paraded through the streets before they were burned to death. However, in spite of the intolerant policy of the shogunate towards arson, arson-induced fires were never fully eliminated from Edo. During the bakumatsu period, public order deteriorated as administration of the shogunate grew incompetent. As a consequence, fires from arson increased drastically.

Some arsonists became subjects of literature and kabuki works. These included Yaoya Oshichi (八百屋お七), whom the Great Fire of Tenna of 1683 (Tenna 3), in which up to 3,500 people perished, was also named after. Oshichi was not responsible for the fire, but lost her house to it. She took shelter in a temple and fell in love with a page there. A year later, she attempted arson based on the fantasy that another fire would enable the two to meet again. She was arrested, tried, and executed by fire. Her story was the basis of Ihara Saikaku's Kōshoku Gonin Onna (『好色五人女』) and Tsuruya Nanboku IV's Katakiuchi Yaguradaiko (『敵討櫓太鼓』).

=== Meteorological conditions ===
The strong winter monsoon from the north was a meteorological condition unique to Edo. It contributed to many winter and spring fires that occurred in dry weather brought about by prevailing northwest and north winds. In addition, strong south winds in the spring and autumn were another cause of great fires. For this reason, the four teams of jōbikeshi (定火消; hatamono firefighters) established by the shogunate in 1658 (Manji 1) were stationed to the northwest of the Edo Castle to protect the castle from fires spreading from that direction.

When the fires were counted by the month, March saw the most "great fires", followed by February, April and January. These four months accounted for 70% of all great fires. The Great Fire of Meireki, being the most catastrophic fire in the history of Edo for claiming up to 107,000 lives, occurred on March 2, 1657 (the 18th day of the first month of Meireki 3 in the Japanese lunisolar Tenpō calendar). Edo's chōnin were well aware of this fact. In winter, women were asked to leave for their parents' residences in the suburbs of Edo and return only after the fire season had passed, resulting in a seasonal population fluctuation. In 1725 (Kyōhō 10), the population in the sixth month was more than 10,000 larger than in the fourth month. Over 90% of the added population were females.

== Tokugawa shogunate's fire prevention measures ==
Tokugawa Yoshimune

Early in the Edo period, prominent officials in the shogunate established the protection of the shōgun and Edo Castle as a priority on windy days, when arson was most likely to occur. In contrast, as a remnant of the Sengoku period, fire prevention measures concerning chōnin's residential areas were given almost no attention. However, as chōnin gained social power, the shogunate's policies also evolved, as a symbol of which, Tokugawa Yoshimune (徳川 吉宗), the eighth shogun, expanded the fire prevention measures to cover Edo universally as part of the Kyōhō Reforms.

=== Firefighting organizations ===
In the early Edo period, firefighting was not institutionalized. However, repetition of great fires became a turning point for the establishment of the hikeshi (火消; "firefighting") system. Firefighters under this system were classified generally into buke hikeshi (武家火消; samurai firefighters) and machibikeshi (町火消; chōnin firefighters). Within buke hikeshi, firefighters were further divided into daimyō hikeshi (大名火消; daimyō firefighters) and jōbikeshi (定火消; hatamoto firefighters). The hikeshi's primary method of firefighting was to demolish buildings surrounding those already ablaze to prevent fire from spreading. During the Meiwa era, a type of wooden pump operated by manpower called ryūdosui (竜吐水; "dragon spraying water") was used, but it never became a fully viable means of firefighting due to the lack of uninterrupted water supply. Up until the Meiji Restoration, the manual demolition of buildings by professional firefighters, of which steeplejacks were a majority, remained the primary method of firefighting.

==== Daimyō hikeshi ====
The daimyō hikeshi was institutionalized in 1643 (Kan'ei 20), two years after the Fire of Oke-machi, as the form of mandatory regular firefighting service assigned to the daimyōs. Before this, daimyōs were dispatched to firefighting tasks by extemporaneous orders issued after fires had broken out. Other forms of daimyō hikeshi included shosho hikeshi (所々火消; "locational firefighters"), who were responsible for locations deemed important by the shogunate such as mausoleums, shrines, and rice granaries; hōgaku hikeshi (方角火消; "positioned firefighters"), who were responsible for individual subdivisions of Edo; and kakuji hikeshi (各自火消; "individual firefighters"), who, in contrast to the self-defense firefighting bodies in the daimyō residences, were obliged to participate in firefighting in the surrounding areas.

==== Jōbikeshi ====
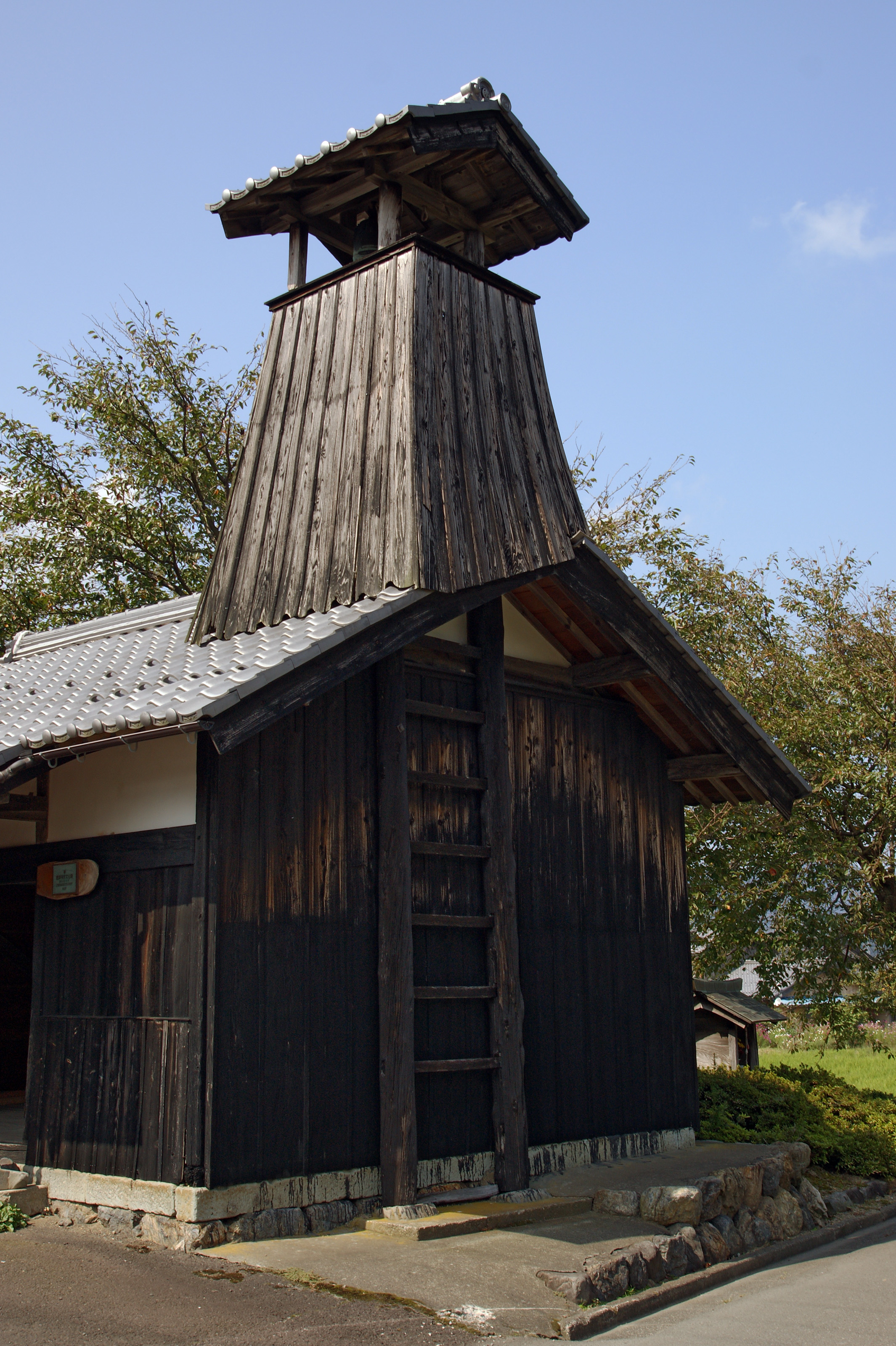
Hinomi yagura of the Edo period

The jōbikeshi was institutionalized in 1658 (Manji 1), one year after the Great Fire of Meireki. Hatamotos were assigned responsibilities of firefighting directly under the command of the shogunate. They were stationed in houses equipped with fire lookout towers called hinomiyagura (火の見櫓). They also employed professional firefighters called gaen (臥煙). Four teams were initially organized. Later, their numbers fluctuated, with as many as 15 teams, to just one team towards the end of the Edo period, depending on the shogunate's financial and military statuses as well as the readiness of the machibikeshi. Most of the time there were ten teams and therefore were also called jūnin yashiki (十人屋敷; "ten-team houses") and jūnin hikeshi (十人火消; "ten-team firefighters").

==== Machibikeshi ====
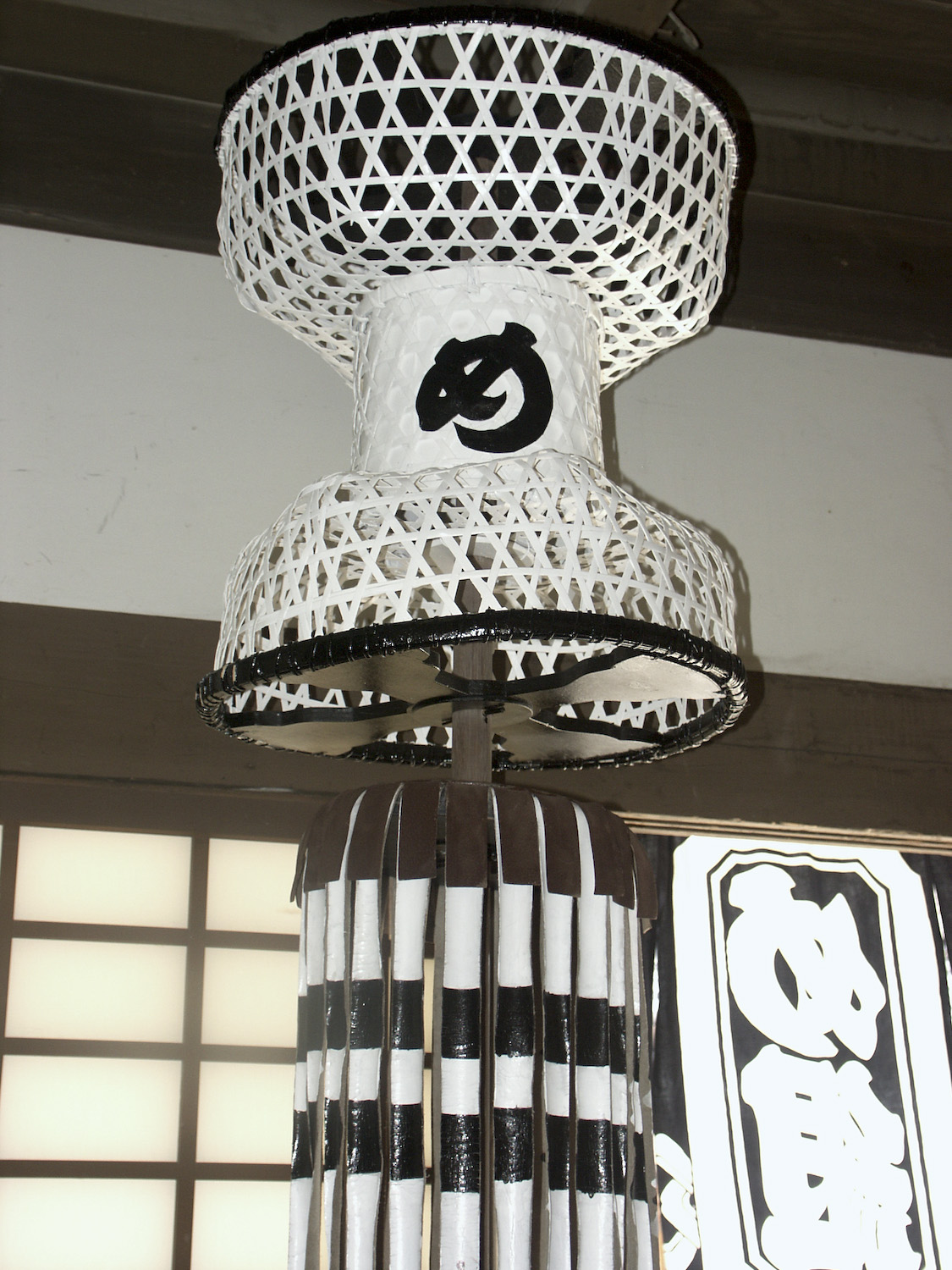
Matoi of me-gumi (め組), one of the firefighting groups

When Tokugawa Yoshimune assumed power as the eighth shogun, the firefighting tasks in Edo were distributed among daimyō hikeshi, jōbikeshi, and tanabikeshi (店火消; business firefighters), of which the latter was chōnin firefighters consisting of merchants and artisans. While daimyō hikeshi and jōbikeshi were experienced firefighters, they were never really concerned about fires occurring in chōnin's residential areas; in the meantime, tanabikeshi was nothing more than bands of amateurish firefighters who themselves would flee from intimidating fires.

In 1720 (Kyōhō 5), Tokugawa Yoshimune institutionalized machibikeshi as part of the Kyōhō Reforms. He ordered machi-bugyō (町奉行; town commissioner) Ōoka Tadasuke (大岡 忠相) to establish new firefighting units that would be truly capable of protecting chōnin's residential areas. Under the machibikeshi system, each town was required to dispatch its chōnin to firefighting tasks. Ōoka accepted suggestions from town officials and organized towns' firefighting groups. Forty-eight groups were formed to the west of the Sumida River. All of them except four were designated using single hiragana letters and thus were collectively referred to as the iroha 48 gumi (いろは 48 組; "48 alphabetical groups"). (Note: Iroha is a Japanese poem known for being a pangram of all kana.) Sixteen other groups were formed in Honjo and Fukugawa to the east of the river. Each group had its own unique matoi (纏; a flag-like identification object) and uniform. Rapport was usual within each group, but discord between groups was common as well. In 1730 (Kyōhō 15), these firefighting groups were reorganized into larger groups to increase the scale and efficiency of fire-time mobilization.

Although machibikeshi were initially only responsible for chōnin's residential areas, their capabilities became recognized and were later dispatched to fight fires in locations within the samurais' residential areas, such as bridges, shrines, rice granaries, and even inside Edo Castle. By the time of the Meiji Restoration, they had become the main firefighting force of Edo, while in contrast, buke hikeshi were greatly reduced by that time.

=== Anti-arson measures ===
As arson was a major cause of fires in Edo, the shogunate spent considerable effort in cracking down on arsonists. A new government position, hitsuke tōzoku aratame-kata (火付盗賊改方; "arson/ theft investigation division"), was introduced. Chōnin were given rewards for capturing arsonists. Arson was made a felony and punished with burning at the stake as a warning to the public.

==== Hitsuke tōzoku aratame ====
Hitsuke tōzoku aratame was a position introduced by the shogunate to target the felonies of arson, theft, and gambling. Although initially there were three separate posts for the three crimes, they were known to be held concurrently by military official Nakayama Naomori (中山 直守) in 1683 (Tenna 3). Later they were eliminated for a short time, but were re-introduced in 1703 (Genroku 16) and unified into a single position in 1718 (Kyōhō 3).

Contrary to the machi-bugyō, who were civil officials, hitsuke tōzoku aratame were military officials. Therefore, their interrogation strategies tended to be violent. While they had the power to arrest suspected arsonists, there was no penalty for mistaken arrests. For this reason, they often tortured the arrested suspects to force confessions, leading to a great number of false charges. This left a notorious image on the chōnin, who nicknamed them "kojiki shibai" (乞食芝居; lowly theaters) while comparing the machi-bugyō and kanjō-bugyō (勘定奉行; financial commissioner) to "ōshibai" (大芝居; grand theaters).

==== Rewards for capturing arsonists and execution by burning ====
The shogunate repeatedly issued ordinances that demanded captured arsonists be immediately turned in and offered rewards to their captors. Furthermore, outstanding crimes against someone who captured an arsonist would be pardoned. Even arsonists who played a significant role in informing against their accomplices or other arsonists were eligible for rewards on top of amnesty. In 1723 (Kyōhō 8), it was ordered that any person could be arrested on the grounds of suspicious behavior in the case of a fire even if he did not commit arson.

As a warning to the public, arrested arsonists were paraded through the city and burned at the stake. Furthermore, charges against them were written on wooden plaques and put on public display. Execution by burning was stipulated in Kujikata Osadamegaki (『公事方御定書』), the penal code of the Edo period, and was practiced until it was replaced in 1868 (Meiji 1) by Karikeiritsu (『仮刑律』), the provisional penal code of the Meiji government. Family members of arsonists were also implicated, and the wives and daughters reduced to indentured servitude or sent into exile.

In the case of a contract arson, the person who paid for the crime was also punishable. When the arsonist was a samurai, execution by burning was inapplicable. Instead, the maximum penalty of gokumon (獄門; "jail gate") was imposed; the condemned samurai was decapitated and the head was placed on a pedestal or platform and displayed for three days, while the body was used for sword-testing. Whoever threatened arson with written notes were initially capitally punishable, but the punishment was later reduced to exile.

Although punishments were given based on the principles described above, extenuating circumstances such as unsuccessful arson attempts were also considered. Arsonists under 15 would not be executed but sent to exile or put on probation.

=== Urban planning ===
Dense distribution of buildings built from flammable materials was an important factor that allowed fires to evolve from small to great. Once one building caught fire, the neighboring ones would soon ignite before any firefighters could respond. For this reason, in the aftermath of the Great Fire of Meireki, structures made with non-flammable materials were promoted in Edo to enhance the city's defense against fires. Fire barrier zones called hiyokechi (火除地; fire protection zones) and hirokōji (広小路; wide alleys) were set up in various places in Edo. Adoption of fire-resistant materials including tiled roofs and earthen houses became mandatory.

==== Hiyokechi and hirokōji ====
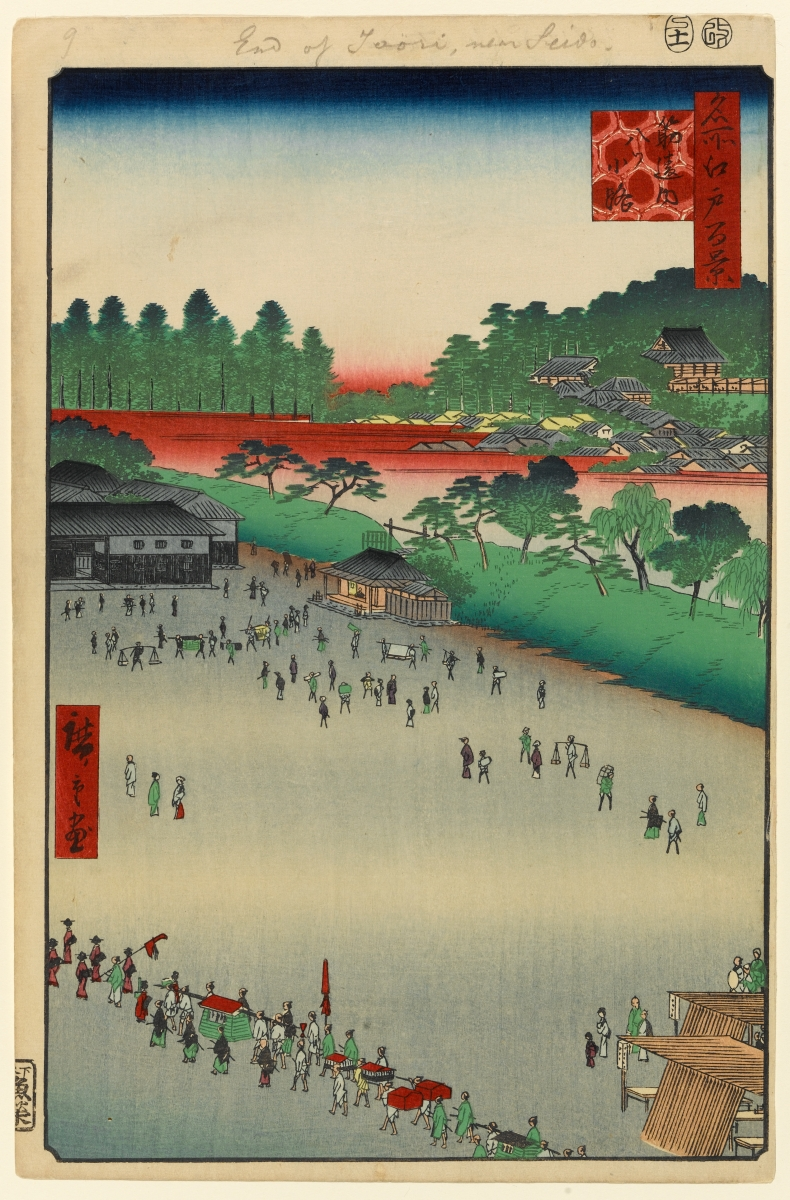
Sujikai uchi Yatsukōji (筋違内八ツ小路), an ukiyo-e print from the collection One Hundred Famous Views of Edo by Utagawa Hiroshige (歌川 広重). Yatsukōji (八ツ小路) was one of the designated hiyokechi after the Great Fire of Meireki.

After the catastrophic loss in the Great Fire of Meireki, fire prevention measures received a great amount of emphasis in the reconstruction plan of Edo. Fire barrier zones were set up to prevent fires from spreading. That started with moving the primary residences of the Gosanke (御三家) outside of the Edo Castle and dedicating the vacated space to fire prevention. Relocation of residences belonging to other daimyōs and hatamotos followed. To alleviate the dense compaction of buildings inside Edo, most of the destinations were chosen to be distant from the castle. Furthermore, during the Genroku era, daimyōs were granted land for constructing their secondary and tertiary residences in the outskirts of Edo, and their tertiary residences were also used as shelters during fires. Land was reclaimed as another means of accommodating new samurai residences. Around 1661 (Kanbun 1), land reclamation in Honjo was completed to allow for construction of samurai residences as well as relocation of chōnin residences. Similar relocation orders were also issued to temples and shrines. Most of them moved outside Edo's canals while some of them found their new sites in Asakusa, Komagome and Koishikawa. The relocation of the red-light district of Yoshihara (吉原) from the neighborhood of Nihonbashi to Asakusa also occurred in this period, although the move had been decided before the Great Fire of Meireki.

The two types of fire barrier zones, hiyokechi (火除地) and hirokōji (広小路) , were created from land vacated by relocation; the former were vacant plazas and the latter widened streets. Additionally, to accompany the street widening policy, houses were required to remove any eaves. The relocations resulted in an enlarged urban Edo. In 1662 (Kanbun 2), the areas of Ueno, Asakusa and Shiba outside the canals were brought under the administration of the machi-bugyō.

After the Great Fire of Tenna, another wave of relocation involving daimyō residences, temples, and shrines, and allowed for new hiyokechi and extended hirokōji. Most temples and shrines were now located outside of the canals as a result. During the Kyōho Reforms, fire prevention was further strengthened starting with the institutionalization of the machibikeshi. In the light of Tokugawa Yoshimune's enthusiasm for a non-flammable Edo, new hiyokechi were set up in Kanda, Hatchōbori and Ichigaya.

Despite the effort to establish fire barrier zones around Edo, there were also cases where homes were built inside the hiyokechi, and stores along the hirokōji, which significantly reduced their efficacy, sometimes to the point where there was an even higher fire risk than before.

==== Fire-resistant and fireproof structures ====
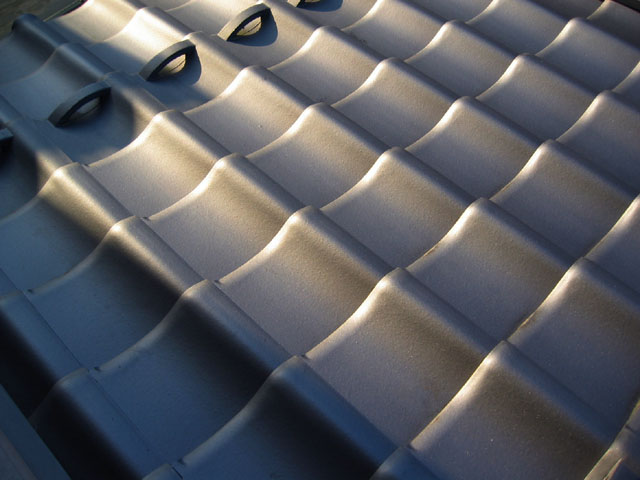
Roof tiles

After the great fire of 1601 (Keichō 6), the shogunate mandated that thatched roofs be modified into shingle roofs. Later, tiled roofs became fashionable among buildings inside luxurious daimyō residences and were also adopted in some chōnin residences. However, after the Great Fire of Meireki, a policy change banned the use of tiled roofs because the fire-resistant tiles fell from roofs and caused many injuries. Instead, flammable thatched roofs were required to be covered with earth to prevent fire from spreading. In 1661 (Kanbun 1), the use of thatched roofs in new buildings was also banned, making shingle roofs the only permitted choice.

It was not until Tokugawa Yoshimune assumed power that tiled roofs became mandatory. For samurai residences, in 1723 (Kyōhō 8), burned-down hatamoto residences near Banchō were required to be rebuilt with tiled roofs. Interest-free loans were also provided for this purpose. After around 1725 (Kyōhō 10), in limited areas, existing residences were required to adopt tiled roofs. Later, this policy became enforced in larger areas with the warning that non-compliant residences would be demolished. For chōnin residences, the ban on tiled roofs was overturned in 1720 (Kyōhō 5). After 1722 (Kyōhō 7), all buildings in Edo were required to have tiled roofs and be built from or covered with earth, although out of consideration of the economic burden on the chōnin, roofs made from oyster shells were also permitted in some cases. Similar to samurai residences, exemption of public service fees and interest-free loans were available, and unmodified residences were subject to demolition.

The non-flammable Edo program driven by the shogunate was carried out under the rule of Tokugawa Yoshimune, though after his death in 1751 (Kan'ei 4), the shogunate became less active due to its troubled financial status. The program was never fully completed, which became the main cause of various great fires before the Meiji era.

=== Prohibitions and fire alert orders ===
In order to prevent fires, the shogunate issued all kinds of directives including prohibitions of potential causes of fires, fire alert orders during important events, and bans on specific activities during actual fires.

Prohibitions targeting fire hazards were directed against public bathhouses, fireworks, Sagichō (左義長), (Note: A fire festival celebrated on the day of full moon of the first month of the lunisolar calendar.) and waste burning. Most chōnin residences were not built with a bath to avoid being suspected as the cause in the case of a fire. As a result, public bathhouses were popular. Although the necessity of fire in the bathhouse business prevented a complete ban, in 1653 (Jōō 2) fire was prohibited in public bathhouses until after 6 pm. The public bathhouses were further required to keep the bath water until morning so that the water could be used for firefighting. Production of fireworks inside the city was prohibited in 1648 (Keian 1). Their use was also banned except at the estuaries and further restricted to only along the Sumida River in 1642 (Keian 5). Sagichō celebrations in towns and houses were banned in the Genroku era. Still earlier, waste burning was outlawed in 1655 (Meireki 1). As an exceptional instance, a ban on kites was issued in 1646 (Shōhō 3), two days after a burning kite fell onto the Kitte-mon (切手門; Kitte Gate) of Edo Castle.

During important events such as the shogun's visit to the Nikkō Tōshō-gū (日光東照宮; Nikkō Tōshō Shrine), a royal female's visit from Kyoto, and arrival of a Joseon delegate, ordinances demanding a raised level of fire alert were issued. Under these ordinances, the city was patrolled to prevent fires and quarrels, water-filled buckets were prepared, and the city area was cleaned up. Similar orders were also issued when rituals were being celebrated at the Kan'ei-ji (寛永寺; Kan'ei Temple), Zōjō-ji (増上寺; Zōjō Temple) and Sannō-sha (山王社; Sannō Shrine).

Specific activities banned during fires included "fire sightseeing", moving tools with large-size carts called daihachiguruma (大八車; "large eight cart"), and use and production of kurumanagamochi (車長持; wheeled clothing-storage boxes), all for the sake of preventing disturbances from intensifying and reducing obstacles of evacuation.

== Chōnin's fire prevention measures ==
While the saying "Money is not to be kept overnight" (Note: 「宵越しの銭はもたねー」) unequivocally displays the unrestrained attitude of Edo's people towards life, it also reflects their pragmatic mentality concerning the city's frequent great fires—money was better off spent soon than lost to a fire. For Edo's chōnin, fires had become a daily routine, yet their spreading was almost unstoppable. When a fires struck their residences and businesses, the first and foremost goal was to evacuate quickly and preserve their properties. On the other hand, they also paid scrupulous attention to making sure that fires would not break out from their own residences.

=== Provisions against fires ===
Fires occurred in Edo regardless of day or night. If a fire broke out while one was asleep, changing clothes and preparing lighting could spell delay in evacuation. Hence, when it entered the fire season as winter approached, as a precaution, people would place items including clothes, waraji (わらじ; straw sandals) and chōchin (提灯; paper lanterns) next to their pillows in case of emergency. When alerted of a fire, the origin and the wind direction would first be confirmed. If the situation was deemed dangerous, valuable articles that could not be carried would be put into dozō (土蔵; earthen storehouses) and anagura (穴蔵; storage holes), business customers would be informed, and people would climb up to the roofs to put out any sparks to prevent the fire from spreading. When the hazard became imminent, they would evacuate with only the valuables that could be taken along.

To protect the valuables from fire, yōjinkago (用慎籠) were used. Yōjinkago were a type of large bamboo basket with which one could carry on the back or shoulders. For important documents, wicker boxes called mochinoki tsuzura (持退き葛籠) were used. Although daihachiguruma and kurumanagamochi could transport larger numbers of items, their large sizes tended to make them obstacles during evacuation. There were also instances where the transported items caught fire from flying sparks and helped spread the fire. These reasons led to their ban by the shogunate.

As an additional measure, and as a forerunner to fire insurance, rich merchants would prepay wood retailers for the materials needed for building a house. If their businesses burned down, then after the debris was removed, the prepaid materials could be immediately claimed for reconstruction, so that the business could resume within a short time.

=== Dozō and anagura ===
Dozō and anagura were structures used for storing items that could not be transferred during fires. Rich merchants typically owned multiples of them. Due to their high costs, dozō were mostly built and used by merchants; in comparison, anagura were more affordable for the common people.

Dozō were storehouses with thick plastered earthen walls and had tiled roofs in most cases. Fire resistance enabled by their thick walls made them ideal for storing commodities, household belongings, tools, and valuable articles. However, they could also suffer from vulnerabilities caused by substandard construction and inappropriate maintenance, letting in fires from crevices in windows and entrances as well as mouse holes, and even collapsing as a result. For this reason, rich merchants would prepare earth in a ready condition so that they could have their regular plasterers quickly seal up their dozō when fires occurred. There were also cases where, when they themselves were originators of fires, they would leave the doors of their dozō open and let them burn down as a form of public atonement. Specially fortified dozō for storing documents called bunkogura (文庫蔵) existed but never gained popularity due to their even higher construction cost, even though they were strong enough to survive great fires. On the other hand, there were also residences and businesses called misegura (見世蔵) that were built to resemble storehouses. However, their fire resistance had to be more or less compromised to accommodate the necessary wide openings for business use. Misegura that have survived to the modern day are now mostly found in the cities of Katori (Sawara area), Tochigi and Kawagoe, giving these cities and their neighborhoods the name "Little Edo" (「小江戸」).

Anagura were underground storage spaces. Unlike the small under-bed storage units, anagura had sufficient space to contain a person and were also built to store valuables. They were cheaper than the dozō, yet remained effective against fires and theft for they had only the covers to secure. Anagura in Edo were first used in 1656 (Meireki 2) by a drapery vendor running a store named Izumi-ya (和泉屋) in Nihonbashi. The effectiveness of Izumi-ya's anagura were recognized in the Great Fire of Meireki and helped popularize them. Concerning the popularity of anagura in Edo, Kawagoe salt merchant Enomoto Yazaemon (榎本 弥左衛門) wrote in his memoir Mitsugo yori no Oboe (『三子より之覚』; Memoirs of My Life Since Age Three) that one tenth of Edo had become holes. Such popularity also gave rise to the profession of anagura daiku (穴蔵大工; anagura carpenters). Although anagura in Edo were mainly built with cypress to prevent leaks caused by high groundwater levels, the underground humidity had nevertheless limited their durability.

== Punishments for fire accidents ==
Although the shogunate imposed punishments including death by burning to crack down on arson, its punishments for fire accidents were nowhere near as harsh. Those of the samurai class who caused a fire would be acquitted if they managed to extinguish it within their residences; so it was with the chōnin if the fire remained small. Although the council of rōjū (老中) considered proposals to impose harsh penalties including death and exile in the case of great fires, such proposals were never adopted. Anecdotal reasoning held that fire accidents at the time could befall anyone, and that the rōjū questioned their readiness to commit seppuku should they themselves accidentally start a great fire.

=== Samurais' fire accidents ===
If a fire occurred in a daimyō residence, as long as the gate was preserved, the owner would not be held accountable even if the houses caught fire. Naturally, the gate became the focus of protection. Some samurai would take their sliding doors off the frames and carry them along as they escaped. Some others would shut the machibikeshi who rushed to the scene out, fight the fires on their own power, then claim that the smoke was merely coming from bonfires. Although there was no physical punishment, a samurai who caused a fire by accident would still need to report to the ōmetsuke (大目付; administration inspector) to serve a house arrest in an alternative residence; if he had let the fire spread from his residence, he would have to present a claim of responsibility to his superior. Three fire accidents would force a samurai to move his residence to the outskirts of Edo even though this was not explicitly stipulated.

=== Chōnins', temples', and shrines' fire accidents ===
For the chōnin, the second volume of the Kujikata Osadamegaki imposed the penalty of 10, 20 and 30 days of oshikome (押込), or strict house arrest, on those who accidentally burned down areas wider than 10 ken (about 18 m). The penalty could be prolonged to 50 days and aggravated with hand cuffing if the fire occurred on a day when the shogun set out for a visit. If the damage of a fire spread across an area wider than 3 chō (about 327 m), apart from the culprit, the head of the family, landlord and gachigyōji (月行事) (Note: A monthly rotating position that oversaw affairs in a town) would also be subjected to 30 days of oshikome. Members of the goningumi (五人組) (Note: In the Edo period, families in neighboring residences were grouped in units of five to share various responsibilities including fighting crimes, securing tribute payments and mutual assistance. Such groups were called goningumi.) where he belonged would be punished with 20 days of oshikome as well. Furthermore, the gachigyōji of the six towns surrounding the fire source except in the leeward would also receive 20 days of oshikome. (Note: These gachigyōji were punished for letting a fire spread. The six towns which they oversaw were the ones whose machibikeshi were required to mobilize during a fire.)

For fire accidents occurring in temples and shrines, out of leniency the shogunate only penalized the firestarters with seven days of enryo (遠慮), or light house arrest, in which discrete night excursions were tolerated. Even a fire that coincided with the shogun's visit or turned great would only add another three days to the punishment. Fire accidents were also punished with much greater clemency in towns built around influential temples and shrines than in other towns. A fire burning down areas wider than 10 ken would incur only three days of oshikome.

== Economic impact ==
Every time a great fire struck, the material and monetary expenses necessitated for resurrecting a devastated Edo were tremendous. Hence, the influence of a great fire on consumer prices as well as economic prospects could ripple from Edo and affect the entire Japan. The frequent occurrence of great fires can therefore be said as a major driving factor that supported the economic growth of Edo. On the contrary, the reconstruction cost also became an enormous burden for the shogunate and contributed to its troubled financial conditions. Also suffering from the economic pressure were the chōnin. It is not unimaginable that a merchant running a big business could be reduced to living in a nagaya after a great fire. When it came to the shogunate's budget, among expenditures allocated to the chōnin, those related to fire prevention and firefighting also accounted for the largest proportions.

=== Skyrocketing consumer prices ===
Each great fire meant a price surge in Edo. Foods, starting with rice, as well as construction materials required for rebuilding houses all saw their prices multiply. For instance, after the Great Fire of Meireki, the price of sake grew from 40 mon per shō (about 1.74 L) (Note: This was before the reform in 1669 that changed the shō to be equivalent to about 1.804 L. See.) to 1000 mon per shō, while that of oil jumped from 3 mon per shō to 2400 mon per shō. The inflated workload of reconstruction in the city helped send the cost of hired artisans soaring. Besides artisans, indentured servants also enjoyed an increase in their salaries for fewer of them wishing to work in Edo out of fear of great fires. Other than these, rents rose based on the shortage of housing; so did the ferry fares due to increased demand before bridges were re-built. These were all impacts that Edo's great fires exerted on the local consumer prices.

In order to control inflationary prices, the shogunate issued ordinances that outlawed price hikes, imposed upper limits on artisans' pay, and penalized the most prominent offenders. Measures that addressed the shortage of rice in Edo were put into effect. Rice was purchased directly from farmers and resold. Farmers were also permitted to come to Edo to sell rice themselves.

Due to increased number of purchase orders placed from Edo to places across the country, the influence of Edo's great fires on the economic prospects was nationwide. The shogunate similarly issued warnings to wide areas against opportunistic price hikes. Nevertheless, that did not stop merchants like Kawamura Zuiken (河村 瑞賢), who built up a fortune from wood trading and contracted construction after the Great Fire of Meireki.

=== Financial burden on the shogunate ===
Expenses of rebuilding the burned-down facilities occupied a large portion of the shogunate's budget. For the Great Fire of Meireki, although the lost tenshu-keep of Edo Castle was left as destroyed, reconstruction of the inner citadel as well as the palaces recorded a total expenditure of over 930,000 ryō. For comparison, Tokugawa Ietsuna (徳川 家綱), the shogun at the time and great-grandson of Tokugawa Ieyasu, inherited money and properties worth 4.23 million ryō from his ancestors.

Other than reconstruction, disaster relief activities were another source of large expenditures. After the Great Fire of Meireki, hatamotos and gokenin (御家人; vassals) received endowments proportional to their stipends and were allowed advanced rice payments. For daimyōs, apart from endowments, were also given ten-year loans. About 160,000 ryō were spent on endowments for chōnin, whose shares corresponded to the sizes of the facades of their residences. Furthermore, daimyōs were ordered to provide congee to chōnin who had lost their homes; chōnin who had their rice granaries burned down were supplied with free rice. After the Great Fire of Meireki, the shogunate continued its relief efforts whenever a great fire occurred, albeit on smaller scales owing to a deteriorating financial status.

== See also ==
- List of Kyoto's fires
- List of historic fires

== Sources ==
- Ikegami, Akihiko (1978). Nishiyama, Matsunosuke (ed.). 江戸火消制度の成立と展開 [Establishment and evolution of Edo's firefighting system]. 江戸町人の研究 [Studies on Edo's Chōnin] (in Japanese). 5. Yoshikawa Kōbunkan.
- Eiju, Nichirō (2007). 江戸の放火 [Arson in Edo] (in Japanese). Hara Shobō.
- Ozawa, Emiko (2007). 災害都市江戸と地下室 [Edo the City of Calamities and Basements] (in Japanese). Yoshikawa Kōbunkan.
- Kuroki, Kyō (1999). 江戸の火事 [Fires of Edo] (in Japanese). Dōseisha.
- Tokyo Fire Department; Edo Firefighting Society (1988). 江戸三火消図鑑 [Edo Firefighting Illustrated] (in Japanese). Iwasaki Bijitsusha.
- Nishiyama, Matsunosuke, ed. (1994). 江戸学事典 [Encyclopaedia on Edo] (in Japanese). Koubundou Publishers.
- Nishiyama, Matsunosuke (1974). Nishiyama, Matsunosuke (ed.). 江戸町人総論 [A general treatise on Edo's chōnin]. 江戸町人の研究 [Studies on Edo's Chōnin] (in Japanese). 1. Yoshikawa Kōbunkan.
- Nishiyama, Matsunosuke (1978). Nishiyama, Matsunosuke (ed.). 火災都市江戸の実体 [Realities of Edo the City of Fire]. 江戸町人の研究 [Studies on Edo's Chōnin] (in Japanese). 5. Yoshikawa Kōbunkan.
- Hata, Ichijirō (1952). 東京災害史 [History of Tokyo's Disasters] (in Japanese). Tosei Tsūshinsha.
- Yamamoto, Junmi (1993). 江戸の火事と火消 [Fires and Firefighting of Edo] (in Japanese). Kawade Shobo Shinsha, Publishers.
- Yoshihara, Kenichirō (1978). Nishiyama, Matsunosuke (ed.). 江戸災害年表 [Chronicle of Edo's disasters]. 江戸町人の研究 [Studies on Edo's Chōnin] (in Japanese). 5. Yoshikawa Kōbunkan.
- 町人による新たな火消組織をつくれ！ [Create a new firefighting organization of chōnin!]. 町火消の誕生 [The Birth of Machibikeshi]. 週刊 江戸 [Edo Weekly] (in Japanese) (45). DeAGOSTINI JAPAN: 2–5. 2010-12-07.
- 町のヒーロー「いろは 48 組」 [Iroha 48 gumi the heroes of towns]. 町火消の誕生 [The Birth of Machibikeshi]. 週刊 江戸 [Edo Weekly] (in Japanese) (45). DeAGOSTINI JAPAN: 6–8. 2010-12-07.
- 火事と喧嘩は江戸の華（上） [Fires and quarrels, the flowers of Edo (Part I)]. 江戸・東京の碑を歩く [A Walking Tour of Edo and Tokyo's Monuments] (in Japanese). Tenrai Shoin. 2007-01-01.
- Hall, John Whitney. (1955). Tanuma Okitsugu, 1719–1788: Forerunner of Modern Japan. Cambridge: Harvard University Press. OCLC 445621
- (in French) Iwao, Seiichi, Teizō Iyanaga et Susumu Ishii. (2002). Dictionnaire historique du Japon. Paris: Maisonneuve & Larose. ISBN 978-2-7068-1575-1; OCLC 51096469
- Screech, Timon. (2006). Secret Memoirs of the Shoguns: Isaac Titsingh and Japan, 1779–1822. London: RoutledgeCurzon. ISBN 0-7007-1720-X (cloth); ISBN 978-0-7007-1720-0 (cloth); ISBN 978-0-203-09985-8 (electronic)
- (in French) Titsingh, Isaac. (1834). Annales des empereurs du Japon. Paris: Oriental Translation Fund of Great Britain and Ireland. OCLC 251800045; see also Imprimerie Royale de France, OCLC 311322353
