= List of fires in Kyoto =

Fires in Kyoto encompassed an essential aspect of urban life in the Japanese capital.

== History ==
Although accidental fires were regular occurrences, some blazes were so devastating that they were afterwards identified as "great;" and these larger fires were more specifically identified by reference to the Japanese era name in which the blaze occurred; as in what came to be known as "the Great Hoei Fire" of 1708.

== Great fires ==
The Great Hoei fire, so-called because it occurred during the Hoei era (1704–1711), broke out on April 28, 1708 (Hōei 5, 8th day of the 3rd month).

The Great Fire of Angen, so-called because it occurred during the Angen era (1175–1177 CE).

The Great Kyōhō fire, so-called because it occurred during the Kyōhō era (1716–1736), is also identified by the name of the area of Kyoto in which the blaze began. In identifying this disaster as the "Great Nishijin fire," an unusual focus is directed towards the cloth weavers clustered in one part of Kyoto. On August 3, 1730 (Kyōhō 15, 20th day of the 6th month), a fire broke out in Muromachi and 3,790 houses were burnt. Over 30,000 looms in Nishi-jin were destroyed. In response, the bakufu distributed rice. The city of Kyoto was home to many cloth weavers, and the neighborhood in which this craft was centered was called Nishijin. The great fire of 1730 broke out not far from the Imperial Palace in the Nishijin neighborhood; and for this reason it was called the Great Nishijin fire.

The Great Tenmei fire, so-called because it occurred during the Tenmei era (1781–1789), raged unchecked for several days. A fire in the city, which began at 3 o'clock in the morning of March 6, 1788 (Tenmei 8, 29th day of the 1st month), continued to burn uncontrolled until March 8 (Tenmei 8, 1st day of the 2nd month); and embers smoldered until they were extinguished by heavy rain on March 11 (Tenmei 8, 4th day of the 2nd month). The emperor and his court fled the fire, and the Imperial Palace was destroyed. No other re-construction was permitted until a new palace was completed, and shōgun Tokugawa Ienari's senior councilor, Matsudaira Sadanobu, was put in charge of rebuilding the palace. This fire was considered a major event. The Dutch VOC opperhoofd in Dejima noted in his official record book that "people are considering it to be a great and extraordinary heavenly portent."

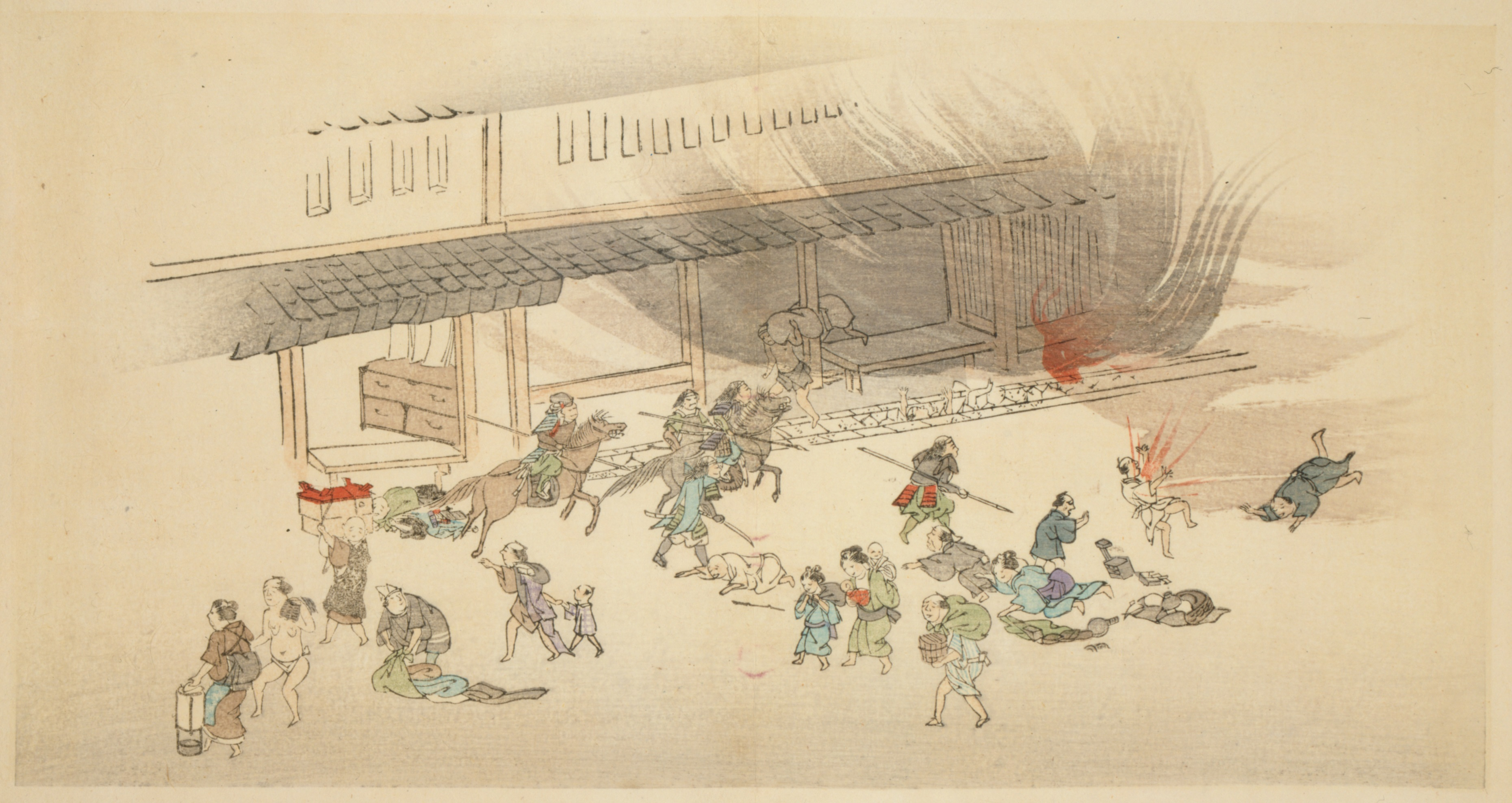
"Battle scene from the Hamaguri Gate Incident of 1864, Kyoto, Japan", an 1893 ukiyo-e print by Yūzan Mori, based on a drawing by Gorei Maekawa.

The Great Genji fire, so-called because it occurred during the Genji era (1864–1865), began on August 20, 1864 (Genji 1, 19th day of the 7th month), as an unintended consequence of the Kinmon Incident.

== Select list of municipal fires ==
Fires other than the major ones are also identified by the Japanese era name or nengō in which the disaster developed.

- June 8, 976 (Ten'en 2, 11th day of the 5th month): The Imperial Palace burned down; and the Sacred Mirror was blackened to such an extent that it reflected no light.
- December 31, 980 (Tengen 3, 22nd day of the 11th month): The Imperial Palace burned down; and the Sacred Mirror was half destroyed.
- December 5, 982 (Tengen 5, 17th day of the 11th month): The Imperial Palace burned down; and the Sacred Mirror was reduced to a lump of melted metal which was collected and presented to the emperor.
- 1148 (Kyūan 4, 6th month): The imperial palace was consumed by flames.
- May 27, 1177 (Jishō 1, 28th day of the 4th month): A great fire in the capital was spread by high winds; and the palace was reduced to cinders.
- 1361 (Kōan 1, 6th month): Snowfall was unusually heavy; and there was also a disastrous fire in Kyoto as well as a violent earthquake.
- April 2, 1620 (Genna 6, 30th day of the 2nd month): A severe fire in Kyoto.
- April 6, 1620 (Genna 6, 4th day of the 3rd month): More fires in Kyoto.
- 1673 (Enpō 1): There was a major fire in Kyoto. Residents of Kyoto and later historians of the period also called this the fire of the first year of Enpō.
- 1675 (Enpō 3): There was a significant fire in Kyoto. It was called the fire of the third year of Enpō.

== See also ==
- List of Edo's fires
- List of fires
