= Edo-no-Hana Meisho-e =

Edo-no-Hana Meisho-e is a rare antique Japanese woodblock print art series.

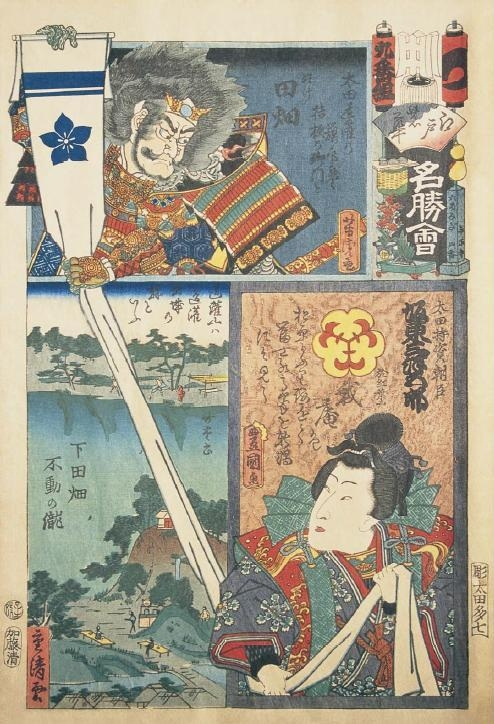
Title: Tabata. Artists: Utagawa Yoshitora, Eisai Shigekiyo & Utagawa Kunisada. Date: 12th month of 1864. Subject: An antique Japanese Woodblock (Ukiyo-e) Print from the series Edo-no-Hana Meisho-e. Image depicts various aspects of the Tabata region, in Edo (Tokyo), Japan. Size: 24.8 cm x 36.3 cm. Origin: From the private collection of Dr Simon Henry - Australia.

== The series title ==
The title of the Ukiyo-e print series Edo-no-Hana Meisho-e translates into English as The Flowers of Edo: A Collection of Famous Places. The Flowers of Edo was a phrase used to describe the finest features of everyday life, as experienced in the various districts of Japan’s Tokugawa capital during the mid-nineteenth century. Included within the scope of the expression were select examples of incredible outdoor beauty, inspirational models of ancient cultural accomplishment and brilliant cases of contemporary creative excellence. The Edo-no-Hana Meisho-e works display images of famous Kabuki actors, illustrations of natural landscapes and important visions of celebrated Japanese myths and legends. The prints also present classical songs and poetry, advertisements for popular commercial products of the day and historical accounts that are associated with each of the locations being examined.

== A collaboration of artists ==
Twenty-one notable artists of the Ukiyo-e era, led by Utagawa Kunisada (also known as Utagawa Toyokuni III), designed the full complement of prints for the Edo-no-Hana Meisho-e series. It is Kunisada's enduring commitment to the work, indicated by his Kabuki actor designs featuring on every sheet in the set, as well as the huge number of contributing illustrators, that distinguishes the project as one of the most significant artist collaborations completed within Japan’s greater art history. Among the contributing illustrators was Hiroshige II, who had previously worked with Kunisada on other collaborative series and who supplied landscape and insect subjects for several of the sheets.

== Production period and print design total ==
The first prints of the Edo-no-Hana Meisho-e series were released by the publisher Katoya Seibei in the twelfth month of 1862, while the last sheets of the set were produced in the first month of 1865. In the two years and two months in which the works were designed and manufactured, seventy prints in total had been created, followed by an index and title page. The index and title pieces are not universally accepted as part of the Edo-no-Hana Meisho-e series. Hesitation to acknowledge the extra pages is based on the reality that both were made after the picture set had ceased production, at a time when it was popular for the collected single sheet works to be assembled in string-bound albums. Additionally, Kunisada did not contribute to the creation of the two supplementary items and inconsequentially the index page lists the works of the series in an ancient Japanese alphabetical arrangement, rather than in an order determined by date of production.

== The series unfinished ==
Although the Edo-no-Hana Meisho-e series concluded with the substantial number of seventy prints having been created, it is likely that the set was originally planned to consist of at least one hundred pieces. This notion is supported by evidence found within the text of one of the works. In the print titled Shinkawa, dated to the eighth month of 1863, the publisher addresses patrons directly, referring to the new edition of one hundred picture prints called Edo-no-Hana. This reference was made at a time when only thirty-three sheets in the series had been completed. It is therefore probable that the project was to continue throughout 1865, instead of finishing abruptly within the first month of that year. The reason for the sudden halt to the production of the set may have been Kunisada's death on 12 January 1865, thereby ending any hope of achieving the proposed one hundred print goal. With the series left unfinished and abandoned, it is significant that three of its final works, those dated to the first month of 1865, are among the last prints to be conceived by the great Ukiyo-e master.

== Print format ==
The Edo-no-Hana Meisho-e prints were produced in a format known as harimaze. Harimaze works were usually designed by one or two artists and featured images divided into several sections. They were generally unrelated pictures on the one page that were made to be individually cut up and used as decoration. The Edo-no-Hana Meisho-e works exhibited designs in defined section portions, each predominantly created by a specific artist, but had a different objective to standard harimaze compositions. With up to five illustrators working on separate pieces of a single sheet, each of the image segments displayed related to the others by presenting various aspects of the one key topic area. Typically divided into five distinct parts, with some exceptions to be found, prints of the Edo-no-Hana Meisho-e series contain: (1) a Title Section, (2) a portion displaying an image of the relevant location, labelled a Meisho Scene, (3) a segment that illustrates a story concerning the area, identified as a Meisho Tale, (4) a picture of a Kabuki Actor that relates to the district and, (5) a Margin Information zone, which presents important data concerning the print’s production, such as the publisher’s name, a carver’s name and a government censor seal. Making use of the harimaze-style format from beginning to end, the Edo-no-Hana Meisho-e set also included some special prints produced in popular multi-sheet arrangements. Responding to public demand for such compositions at the time, the seventy works of the series came to incorporate three diptyches, one triptych and one rare four-sheet tetraptych.

== Word play ==
An entertaining feature of the Edo-no-Hana Meisho-e prints is the use of double meanings, which often relate to place names, within the text that accompanies many of the famous landscape scenes. It is also notable that puns and dual interpretations can be found in some of the signed alternate names used by the artists and within the title of the series itself. The phrase, "Flowers of Edo" was not only a metaphor for the finest aspects of the day, but also a colloquial expression used to describe the fires that often threatened an urban Edo environment, constructed predominantly of wood and paper. The reference to the constant threat of flames in the city is also reinforced in each of the prints, by the display of the troop name, number and emblem of the firemen responsible for protecting the relevant Edo district pictured. Moreover, as fire-fighters were admired as great examples of enthusiasm and bravery, they were likely considered as much a "Flower of Edo" as any popular Kabuki actor or fashionable Ukiyo-e print artist of the period.

== The significance of the series ==
The Edo-no-Hana Meisho-e series is a sophisticated instrument of ancient Japanese artistic and literary display. It is a body of work that chronicles the material and intellectual concerns of late Edo period Japan, not more than a few short years before it was irreversibly changed by the extensive social reforms of the Western-influenced Meiji Restoration. Of great interest is the rare blending of all known major Ukiyo-e print subject categories within the confines of one work. Never before had Japan experienced a more successful integration of images of Kabuki actors, landscapes, warriors, myths and beautiful women, as was able to be seen in the Edo-no-Hana Meisho-e series. The project is also a means to explore something of the relationships between print artists of the time and with twenty-one contributing illustrators, stands as the largest collaborative creative enterprise ever completed within Japan’s Ukiyo-e art history. In particular it presents a progressive generous quality to the nature of Kunisada and exhibits rare works created by him in his final days. Recognising Kunisada as the senior artist of the series, print sections of a similar size to his own, designed by comparatively junior artists, were displayed on the same sheet as if created by equals. This was no doubt an intentional practice, either initiated or endorsed by Kunisada, which served to validate some of his rising students and the pupils of other great print masters, as a new generation of independent artists.
