= Kujikata Osadamegaki =

1742 Japanese official rulebook

Kujikata Osadamegaki (Japanese: 公事方御定書, "book of rules for public officials") was a two-volume rulebook for Japanese judicial bureaucrats during the Edo period. It was enacted by Shōgun Tokugawa Yoshimune in 1742.

The book was used to determine appropriate judgements and punishments by servants of the daimyō, but these servants were not required to follow the guidelines of the Kujikata Osadamegaki. Rather, they were bound to mete out fair justice only by the Japanese Confucian directive to serve one's daimyō well.
