= Mass media in Charleston, South Carolina =

Charleston, South Carolina, is the 95th largest media market in the United States, with 326,770 households and 0.27% of the U.S. TV population. The following stations are licensed in Charleston and have significant operations or viewers in the city:

== Major network television affiliates ==
- WCBD-TV (2, NBC, CW+): owned by Nexstar Media Group, studios in Mount Pleasant, licensed in Charleston
- WGWG (4, MeTV): (owned by Howard Stirk Holdings), studios in Mount Pleasant, licensed in Charleston
- WCSC-TV (5, CBS): owned by Gray Television, studios in Charleston, licensed in Charleston
- WITV-TV (7, PBS): owned by South Carolina Educational Television, transmitter in Mount Pleasant, South Carolina, licensed in Charleston
- WHDC-LD (12, Court TV): owned by Lowcountry 34 Media, LLC, licensed in Charleston
- WLCN-CD (18, CTN): owned by Christian Television Network, studios in Summerville, licensed in Charleston
- WTAT-TV (24, Fox): owned by Cunningham Broadcasting, studios in North Charleston, licensed in Charleston
- WAZS-LD (29, Azteca America Independent): owned by Jabar Communications, studios in North Charleston, licensed in Charleston
- WCIV (36, MyTV, ABC): owned by Sinclair Broadcast Group, studios in Mount Pleasant, licensed in Charleston

== Radio ==
=== FM ===
- WSCI - South Carolina Educational TV Radio [89.3 MHz] - NPR News and Classical
- WKCL - We Know Christ Lives [91.5 MHz] - Contemporary Christian
- WCKN - 92.5 Kickin' Country [92.5 MHz] - Country music
- WWWZ - Z93 Jamz [93.3 MHz] - Urban Contemporary
- WSCC - NewsRadio94.3 [94.3 MHz] - News / Talk
- W234CV - The Zone 94.7 MHz Sports
- WSSX - 95SX [95.1 MHz] - Contemporary Top 40
- W238CO - Latina 95.5 [95.5 MHz] - Spanish Adult Contemporary
- WMXZ - Modern Hits 95.9 [95.9 MHz] - Modern Hits
- WOHM - [96.3 MHz] Variety
- WIWF - The Wolf [96.9 MHz] - Classic Hits
- WYBB - 98 Rock [98.1 MHz] - Active Rock
- W253BW - 98.5 WQSC [98.5 MHz] Classic Country
- WTMZ-FM -ESPN [98.9 MHz] - Sports
- W257BQ - The Box [99.3 MHz] - Urban Contemporary (Simulcast on 95.9 WMXZ HD2)
- WXST - Star99.7 [99.7 MHz] - Urban Adult Contemporary
- W261DG - Heaven 100.1 [100.1 MHz] - Gospel (Heaven 1390AM FM Translator)
- WALC - HIS Radio [100.5 MHz] - Contemporary Christian
- WAYA-FM - WAY-FM [100.9 & 101.3 MHz] - Contemporary Christian
- WAVF - CHUCK FM [101.7 MHz] - Adult Hits
- W254BK - The City [102.1 MHz] - Greatest Hits of the 60s, 70s, & 80s (Simulcast on WQNT 1450 AM)
- WXLY - Y102.5 [102.5 MHz] - Adult Contemporary
- WEZL - WEZL 103.5 [103.5 MHz] - Country
- W280EX - La Raza 103.9 [103.9 MHz] Regional Mexican
- WRFQ - Q104.5 [104.5 MHz] - Classic Rock
- WCOO - 105.5 The Bridge [105.5 MHz] - Album Adult Alternative
- WJNI - Gospel 106.3 [106.3 MHz] - Gospel
- WMGL - 107-3 MAGIC [107.3 MHz] - Urban Adult Contemporary

=== AM ===
- WLTQ - [730 kHz] - Religious
- WTMZ - The Zone [910 kHz] - Sports Talk
- WCDC - Moody Radio Charleston [950 kHz] - Christian radio
- WAZS - La Raza 103.9 [980 kHz] - Regional Mexican
- WTMA - The Lowcountry's Big Talker [1250 kHz] - News / Talk
- WQSC - Classic Country 98.5 FM [1340 kHz] - Classic Country
- WSPO - Heaven 1390 [1390 kHz] - Gospel (Simulcast on 95.9 HD3)
- WQNT - [1450 kHz] - The City (Greatest Hits of the 60s, 70s, & 80s)
- WZJY - Latina 95.5 [1480 kHz] - Spanish Tropical

=== High definition digital radio ===
- 1640 XSUR - 70s & 80s ("Surfside 1640")

== Print, online media and mobile apps ==
- Local newspapers in Charleston include The Post and Courier, the Charleston City Paper, The Charleston Chronicle, the Charleston Regional Business Journal, The Catholic Miscellany, and the Island Eye News.
- A local online-only paper is TheDigitel.
- A popular, local digital publication is Charleston Daily. Charleston Daily can also be found across multiple mobile apps celebrating in everything Charleston, South Carolina.

== See also ==
- South Carolina media
  - List of newspapers in South Carolina
  - List of radio stations in South Carolina
  - List of television stations in South Carolina
  - Media of locales in South Carolina: Columbia, Greenville
