= WCSC =

WCSC may refer to:

- WCSC-TV, a television station (channel 5) in Charleston, South Carolina, United States
- World Chess Solving Championship
- WSPO, a radio station (1390 kHz) in Charleston, South Carolina, U.S., which held the call sign WCSC from 1930 to 1989
- WIWF, a radio station (96.9 MHz) in Charleston, South Carolina, U.S., which held the callsign WCSC-FM from 1948 to 1973
