= W257BQ =

Relays WXST-HD2, Hollywood
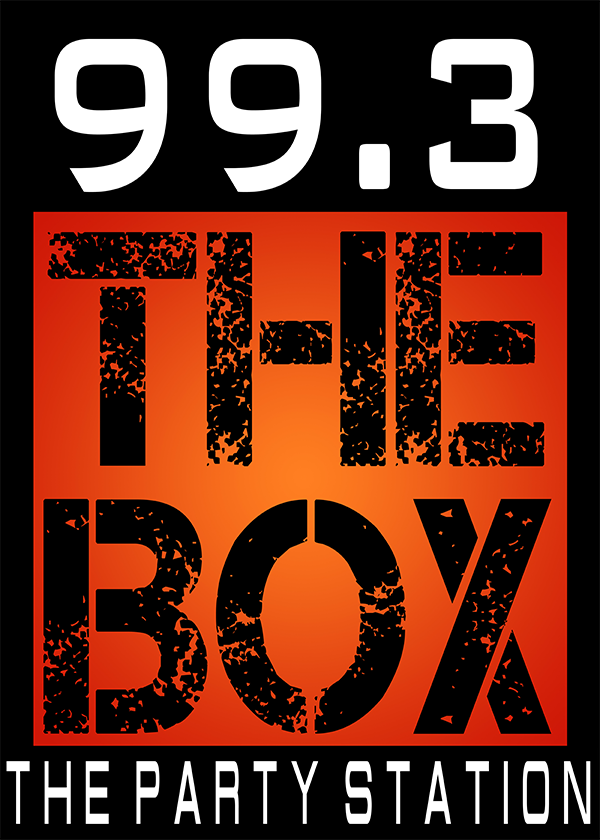
- Charleston, South Carolina; United States
- Broadcast area: Charleston, South Carolina
- Frequency: 99.3 MHz
- Branding: 99.3 The Box

Programming
- Format: Mainstream urban
- Affiliations: Compass Media Networks

Ownership
- Owner: Charleston Radio Group (Saga Communications); (Saga South Communications, LLC)
- Sister stations: WAVF, WCKN, WMXZ, WSPO, WXST

History
- First air date: 2009

Technical information
- Licensing authority: FCC
- Facility ID: 149563
- Class: D
- ERP: 250 watts
- HAAT: 110.2 meters
- Transmitter coordinates: 32°49′27.00″N 80°00′10.00″W

Links
- Public license information: Public file; LMS
- Webcast: Listen Live
- Website: 993thebox.com

W257BQ (99.3 FM) is an American radio station serving the Charleston, South Carolina, area with a mainstream urban format simulcast on the HD-2 channel of WXST. This station is under ownership of the Charleston Radio Group subsidiary of Saga Communications. Its studios are located in Charleston (east of the Cooper River) and the transmitter tower is in Charleston as well (west of the Ashley River).

== History ==
WSPO changed to sports talk in 2009 and began using the translator W257BQ at 99.3.

On October 22, 2011, WSPO changed their format to regional Mexican, branded as "Ritmo Caliente 99.3" and simulcast with W257BQ.

In 2012, WSPO changed to a tourist information format, ending the simulcast.

In 2013, W257BQ changed their format from Regional Mexican "Ritmo Caliente 99.3" to an Urban Contemporary format "99.3 The Box". This move brought "The Box" back to the area. The station originally aired on WCKN 92.5 as "92.5 The Box" from 2010 until 2011.

99.3 The Box is Charleston's home to the nationally syndicated morning show The Breakfast Club weekdays from 6:00AM until 10:00AM featuring Charleston's very own Charlamagne Tha God.

On September 6, 2017, the sale of the station to Saga Communications was complete.
