= WAZS =

WAZS may refer to:

- WAZS (AM), a radio station (980 AM) licensed to Summerville, South Carolina, United States
- WTMZ-FM, a radio station (98.9 FM) licensed to McClellanville, South Carolina, which formerly used the call letters WAZS-FM
- WAZS-LD, a low-power television station (channel 29) licensed to North Charleston, South Carolina
