= WTMZ =

WTMZ may refer to:

- WTMZ (AM), a radio station (910 AM) licensed to serve Dorchester Terrace–Brentwood, South Carolina, United States
- WTMZ-FM, a radio station (98.9 FM) licensed to serve McClellanville, South Carolina
