= WXTC =

WXTC may refer to:

- WXTC (FM), a radio station (88.1 FM) licensed to serve Greenville, Pennsylvania, United States
- WIWF, a radio station (96.9 FM) licensed to serve Charleston, South Carolina, United States, which held the call sign WXTC from 1973 to 1996
- WSPO, a radio station (1390 AM) licensed to serve Charleston, South Carolina, United States, which held the call sign WXTC from 1991 to 2009
