= WCSC-TV =

Television station in Charleston, South Carolina

- Charleston, South Carolina; United States
- Channels: Digital: 19 (UHF); Virtual: 5
- Branding: Live 5; Bounce TV Charleston (5.2)

Programming
- Affiliations: 5.1: CBS; for others, see § Subchannels

Ownership
- Owner: Gray Media; (Gray Television Licensee, LLC)

History
- First air date: June 19, 1953
- Former channel numbers: Analog: 5 (VHF, 1953–2009); Digital: 47 (UHF, 2002–2018)
- Former affiliations: All secondary: NBC (1953–1954); DuMont (1953–1955); ABC (1953–1962)
- Call sign meaning: Wonderful Charleston, South Carolina

Technical information
- Licensing authority: FCC
- Facility ID: 71297
- ERP: 625 kW
- HAAT: 521 m (1,709 ft)
- Transmitter coordinates: 32°55′29″N 79°41′57″W

Links
- Public license information: Public file; LMS
- Website: www.live5news.com

WCSC-TV (channel 5) is a television station in Charleston, South Carolina, United States, affiliated with CBS and owned by Gray Media. The station's studios are located in the West Ashley section of Charleston, and its transmitter is located in Awendaw, South Carolina. Both the studio and road are named for long-time WCSC personalities: Bill Sharpe, a news anchor from 1973 until his retirement in 2021, and Charlie Hall, the station's original personality who died just months before its relocation to the current facilities in 1997.

== History ==
WCSC-TV began broadcasting on June 19, 1953. Originally operating from studios located on East Bay Street in downtown Charleston, it was the second television station in South Carolina and the oldest continuously operating station in the state (the first was WCOS-TV in Columbia, which broadcast from May 1953 to January 1956). It is the only station in Charleston to keep its original network affiliation since sign-on. The channel aired an analog signal on VHF channel 5 and was originally owned by the Rivers family along with WCSC radio (AM 1390, now WSPO, and 96.9 FM, now WIWF).

Many of WCSC's early on-air staff were former radio disc jockeys who became involved with the new medium of television in 1953, including Al Stone, formerly recruited from WGAR who at the time worked alongside Alan Freed (Moondog) in Cleveland. Al Stone started with WCSC in 1952 as a radio DJ and the following year started hosting as emcee local program in 1953 called Waxworks and later a local popular American Bandstand–type dance show reviewing music for local teens. Carroll Godwin hosted a local daytime talk show in the 1960s. Loraine (Rainee) Evans hosted the popular children's program The Happy Raine Show. Ken Klyce was another popular news announcer.

The Rivers family sold WCSC-TV to Crump Communications of Houston in 1987 while the radio stations were sold to Ralph Guild of New York City. Crump kept the station until selling it to GE Capital in 1991. Three years later, WCSC-TV was sold to the Jefferson-Pilot Corporation in 1994. Jefferson-Pilot merged with the Lincoln Financial Group in 2006 with its broadcast properties assuming the new corporate name of Lincoln Financial Media. In 1997, the station moved to newly built studios on Charlie Hall Boulevard in the West Ashley section of Charleston. The street was named for WCSC's longtime weatherman, Charlie Hall, who had been the first person seen on the station when it signed on in 1953. One of the station's most popular personalities, Hall stayed at channel 5 there covering events including Hurricane Hugo's impact on Charleston in 1989 until his death in March 1997. Local sports coverage has also been prominent at WCSC. In the early 1980s, Charleston Cougars games were aired on the station. It aired the Cooper River Bridge Run from 1986 until 1990 and resumed the telecasts in 2004. The broadcasts feature reporters on the course.

WCSC was the local outlet for Atlantic Coast Conference basketball and Southeastern Conference football which have been produced by its parent company since the 1980s. In 2004, Jefferson-Pilot management effectively forced out Warren Peper (who had been with the station since 1974) by only offering him a one-year extension of his contract with no renewal option. The popular anchor, who had handled both news and sports during his time at WCSC, was also the play-by-play announcer for the station's live coverage of college basketball and the Cooper River Bridge Run.

After the station was sold to Jefferson-Pilot, Peper was a sideline reporter for the company's syndicated college football broadcasts. Peper went to Media General's WCBD-TV after a one-year non-compete agreement in the market expired. Viewers wrote that they hoped WCSC would not force out longtime anchors Bill Sharpe and Debi Chard in the same way. WCSC had lured meteorologist Bill Walsh away from rival WCIV in 1994 and had to hide his identity with thunderclouds when running station promotions during his non-compete agreement.

On November 12, 2007, Lincoln Financial Media entered into an agreement to sell WCSC and the company's two other television stations (WBTV in Charlotte, North Carolina, and WWBT in Richmond, Virginia) and Lincoln Financial Sports to Raycom Media for $583 million. Raycom took ownership of the station on April 1, 2008. This made WCSC sister to WIS in Columbia, WTOC-TV in Savannah, Georgia, and WMBF-TV in Myrtle Beach. Between them, the four stations cover the eastern two-thirds of South Carolina.

On October 3, 2013, in honor of Bill Sharpe's 40 years at the station, the studio was renamed the Bill Sharpe Studio.

On June 25, 2018, Gray Television announced its intent to acquire Raycom for $3.65 billion, pending regulatory approval. The sale was completed on January 2, 2019.

== Local programming ==
=== Sports ===
Since 2024, WCSC's 3rd subchannel has aired select matches featuring the Charleston Battery of the USL Championship.

=== News operation ===
WCSC's newscasts have long dominated the ratings in Charleston. The station's various owners have always poured significant resources into the news department, resulting in a much higher-quality product than conventional wisdom would suggest for a market of Charleston's size. The station had the same two news anchors weeknights at 6:30 from the mid-1970s until 1991 and the same three news anchors were together until 1997. Bill Sharpe became an employee at the station in 1973 after a short time at WTMA and has been with the station for over 40 years, with the station naming the primary studio for him in 2013. For most of the time since 1991, he has been teamed with Debi Chard. Sharpe retired on October 28, 2021. WCSC has been a trend-setter in South Carolina for newscasts as it expanded its local evening news programming on weeknights from thirty minutes to two and a half hours and has the most newscasts in the state within a broadcast day.

After Fox requested its affiliates to air local news in the early 1990s, WTAT-TV (then owned by Act III Broadcasting) entered into a news share agreement with WCSC. This resulted in a nightly prime time broadcast known as The Fox 24 News at 10 to debut. It was the first prime time show in South Carolina, in the early 90s, followed by Fox affiliate WACH in Columbia which had a similar arrangement with NBC affiliate WIS, in that market, during the mid to late 90s. Eventually, an hour-long morning show on weekdays called The Fox 24 News at 7 also produced by WCSC launched on WTAT. Both shows originate from a secondary studio at 2126 Charlie Hall Boulevard (not the Sharpe studio). The 10 o'clock news is currently the second highest rated broadcast in the area.

In 1991, this station began airing a one-hour broadcast weeknights at 6 which later became ninety minutes from 5 to 6:30 followed by CBS Evening News in 1997. Prior to this, the national news aired at 7. In January 2000, WCSC launched its regional weather radar called "Live Super Doppler 5000". Now known as "Super Doppler HD", the system comprises four regional live NOAA National Weather Service radars and its own Collins radar sold by Advanced Designs Corporation in Bloomington, Indiana (which makes the station the only one in the market to operate its own radar). The station has often shared weather radars with fellow Raycom stations since the practice started after being purchased by Jefferson-Pilot.

In 2004, it added a thirty-minute newscast weekdays at 4 p.m. now totaling two hours of local broadcasts between 4 and 6:30. WCSC is the only station in the area to air local news at 4. In August 2006, with anchor and format changes at the CBS Evening News and concerns over ratings, it added a prime time show weeknights at 7 to "piggyback" with the network newscast. WCSC and ABC affiliate WCIV-DT2 are the only stations in the area to offer news in this time slot, and is similar to fellow Raycom stations in the Carolinas, following the lead of WIS, which has run 7 p.m. since 1963.

The station expanded its weather product with the "Live 5 Storm TRACKER Mobile Storm Center". It is the first vehicle of its kind in the region and allows WCSC meteorologists access to weather data away from the station and ability to send back live weather data for display on-air. On September 29, 2008, WCSC set another broadcasting benchmark in the area when it became the first to offer newscasts in high definition. The upgrade included new custom Raycom corporate graphics, a re-designed HD logo, and updated music package. The WTAT broadcasts were initially not included in the new HD production because that station was not yet equipped to broadcast local or syndicated programming in high definition. As of January 24, 2011, the WTAT news shows are now in HD. Starting August 31, 2009, the weeknight prime time show at 10 on WTAT was expanded to an hour and added a second news anchor.

On January 25, 2014, WCSC-TV expanded its news presence, again, by adding a Saturday and Sunday morning broadcast of Live 5 News This Morning from 6 a.m. to 8 a.m.

On December 31, 2015, WCSC-TV produced its last broadcast for WTAT-TV (with production for that station moving to sister station WCIV). WCSC-TV began producing an expansion to Live 5 News on its Bounce digital subchannel from 7 a.m. to 8 a.m. The station also expanded its 7 p.m. newscast to one hour in late November.

In 2023, a new Bill Sharpe Studio was constructed with influence from Gray's WANF in Atlanta.

==== Notable former on-air staff ====
- Ben Mankiewicz
- Bill Sharpe – anchor (1973–2021)

== Technical information ==
=== Subchannels ===
The station's signal is multiplexed:

Subchannels of WCSC-TV
Subchannel	Res.	Short name	Programming
5.1	1080i	WCSCDT	CBS
5.2	480i	WCSCBNC	Bounce TV
5.3	480i	CSCPSEN	Palmetto Sports & Entertainment
5.4	480i	WCSCGRT	Grit
5.5	480i	WCSCDT5	Quest
5.6	480i	WCSCDT6	Ion Mystery
5.7	480i	WCSC365	365BLK
4.2	720p	WGWGDEC	Catchy Comedy (WGWG)

Broadcast on behalf of another station

WCSC-TV launched a second subchannel on January 8, 2010, that carries additional programming, branded as Live 5+. Until 2013, the schedule consisted of additional syndicated programming (some of which has moved to other stations) as well as select programming from the main channel aired on 5.2. On December 26, 2013, select programming from This TV was added the channel. As of 2016, syndicated programs are no longer seen on the schedule. WCSC-TV added Bounce TV to 5.3 upon its launch on September 26, 2011.

=== Analog-to-digital conversion ===
WCSC-TV shut down its analog signal, over VHF channel 5, at 6 a.m. on June 12, 2009, as part of the federally mandated transition from analog to digital television. Reporter Bill Burr and chief meteorologist Bill Walsh conducted the switch inside the transmitter room during the station's morning newscast. The station's digital signal remained on its pre-transition UHF channel 47, using virtual channel 5.

On June 1, 2018, as part of the repacking process, WCSC-TV moved its digital signal to channel 19.
