= WMGL =

- Ravenel, South Carolina; United States
- Broadcast area: Charleston metropolitan area and South Carolina Lowcountry
- Frequency: 107.3 MHz
- Branding: Magic 107.3

Programming
- Format: Urban adult contemporary

Ownership
- Owner: Cumulus Media Inc.; (Radio License Holding CBC, LLC)
- Sister stations: WIWF, WSSX-FM, WTMA, WWWZ

History
- First air date: February 1986 (as WFXR at 101.7)
- Former call signs: WGOX (1984–1985, CP); WFXR (1985–1987)
- Former frequencies: 101.7 MHz (1986–2008)
- Call sign meaning: W MaGic for South CaroLina or Lowcountry

Technical information
- Licensing authority: FCC
- Facility ID: 61592
- Class: C3
- ERP: 16,500 watts
- HAAT: 125 meters (410 ft)
- Transmitter coordinates: 32°54′18.00″N 79°55′19.00″W

Links
- Public license information: Public file; LMS
- Webcast: Listen live
- Website: magic1073fm.com

WMGL (107.3 FM) is a commercial radio station licensed to Ravenel, South Carolina, and serving the Charleston metropolitan area and South Carolina Lowcountry. It broadcasts an urban adult contemporary radio format and calls itself "Magic 107.3." It is owned by Cumulus Media Inc., through its licensee Radio License Holding CBC, LLC. The radio studios and offices are on Faber Place Drive in North Charleston. On weekdays, WMGL carries two nationally syndicated programs, The Rickey Smiley Morning Show and The D.L. Hughley Show.

WMGL has an effective radiated power (ERP) of 16,500 watts. It has a construction permit from the Federal Communications Commission to boost power to 50,000 watts. The transmitter tower is on Radio Lane in Charleston, near the Cooper River.

== History ==
In February 1986, the station signed on as WFXR, located on the FM dial at 101.7 MHz.

WMGL played smooth jazz at one time. Before that it had an urban contemporary format with the call sign WLNB.

WMGL was at 101.7 FM until late in 2008, when WKZQ in Myrtle Beach (which was also at 101.7 FM), traded frequencies with WAVF (which was at 96.1), WMGL was on 101.7 FM. WNKT, at 107.5 FM, had moved to Columbia in 2007, allowing WMGL to move to 107.3.

Citadel Broadcasting sold 11 of its radio stations including WMGL to The Last Bastion Station Trust, LLC, in 2007 upon its acquisition of ABC Radio due to ownership limits. However, after WNKT successfully moved out of the Charleston market, Cumulus Media re-purchased WMGL.
