= WUJM =

WUJM may refer to:

- WUJM-LP, a low-power radio station (99.1 FM) licensed to serve St. Petersburg, Florida, United States
- WGBL, a radio station (96.7 FM) licensed to serve Gulfport, Mississippi, United States, which held the call sign WUJM from 1999 to 2014
- WQNT, a radio station (1450 AM) licensed to serve Charleston, South Carolina, United States, which held the call sign WUJM from 1990 to 1996
- WSCC-FM, a radio station (94.3 FM) licensed to serve Goose Creek, South Carolina, which held the call sign WUJM or WUJM-FM from 1984 to 1992
