= WLVW (disambiguation) =

WLVW is a call sign of these broadcasting stations in the United States:

- WLVW, a radio station (FM 107.3 MHz) licensed to Washington DC, which has held the call sign WLVW since June of 2019
- WCOO, a radio station (FM 105.5 MHz) licensed to Kiawah Island, South Carolina, which held the call sign WLVW from 1982 to 1985
- WLDW, a radio station (FM 105.5 MHz) licensed to Salisbury, Maryland, which held the call sign WLVW from 1991 to 2004, and again from 2011 to 2019
- WRQY, a radio station (FM 96.5 MHz) licensed to Moundsville, West Virginia, which held the call sign WLVW from 2007 to 2011
- WTGM, a radio station (AM 960 kHz) licensed to Salisbury, Maryland, which held the call sign WLVW from 1989 to 1993
