= WIOP =

WIOP may refer to:

- WIOP-LP, a low-power radio station (106.3 FM) licensed to serve Shepherdsville, Kentucky, United States
- WMXZ, a radio station (95.9 FM) licensed to serve Isle of Palms, South Carolina, United States, which held the call sign WIOP from 2009 to 2012
