= ABC Charleston =

ABC Charleston may refer to:

- WCIV in Charleston, South Carolina
- WCHS-TV in Charleston, West Virginia
