= WHLZ =

WHLZ may refer to:

- W21EU-D, a low-power television station (channel 21, virtual 19) licensed to serve Harrisburg, Pennsylvania, United States, which held the call sign WHLZ-LD until 2026
- WCKN, a radio station (92.5 FM) licensed to serve Moncks Corner, South Carolina, United States, which held the call sign WHLZ from 1986 to 2003
- WWFN-FM, a radio station (100.5 FM) licensed to serve Marion, South Carolina, which held the call sign WHLZ from 2003 to 2017
