= Rob Fowler =

Rob Fowler may refer to:

- Rob Fowler (meteorologist), chief meteorologist for WCBD-TV
- Rob Fowler (curler) (born 1975), Canadian curler
