= WJNI =

- Ladson, South Carolina; United States
- Broadcast area: Charleston metropolitan area
- Frequency: 106.3 MHz (HD Radio)
- Branding: Gospel 106.3 FM

Programming
- Format: Urban Gospel
- Subchannels: HD2: Old Skool 92.1 (Classic hip hop)

Ownership
- Owner: Kirkman Broadcasting Inc.
- Sister stations: WQNT, WQSC, WTMZ, WTMZ-FM

History
- First air date: June 15, 1998; 27 years ago
- Call sign meaning: With Jesus Nothing's Impossible

Technical information
- Licensing authority: FCC
- Facility ID: 66798
- Class: A
- ERP: 6,000 watts
- HAAT: 100 meters (330 ft)
- Transmitter coordinates: 32°55′42.00″N 80°6′13.00″W
- Translator: HD2: 92.1 W221CI (Summerville)

Links
- Public license information: Public file; LMS
- Webcast: Listen Live; Listen Live (HD2)
- Website: wjnigospel.com oldskool921.com (HD2)

WJNI (106.3 MHz) is an FM radio station broadcasting an urban gospel radio format. It is licensed to Ladson, South Carolina, and it serves the Charleston metropolitan area. The station is currently owned by Kirkman Broadcasting with studios in the West Ashley section of Charleston.

WJNI is a Class A FM station. It has an effective radiated power (ERP) of 6,000 watts. The transmitter is in North Charleston. WJNI broadcasts using HD Radio technology. Its HD2 digital subchannel airs classic hip hop music, which feeds FM translator W221CI at 92.1 MHz in Summerville.

== History ==
In Spring 1999, WJNI jumped from 16th in the Winter ratings to 12th; a year earlier it was not even on the air. Cliff Fletcher said the station drew listeners from stations owned by big companies because it was unique, with community involvement and "empowerment" major features of the format. The target audience was 25 to 44.

In Winter 2002, WJNI reached number six.

As of August 17, 2020, the W221CI translator on 92.1 was temporarily simulcasting WJNI but planned to return to airing the HD-2 programming, which had been classic hits, heard on WQNT and W271CP 102.1. It now has a classic hip hop format.
