= WYBB =

- Folly Beach, South Carolina; United States
- Broadcast area: Charleston metropolitan area and the South Carolina Lowcountry
- Frequency: 98.1 MHz
- Branding: 98 Rock

Programming
- Format: Mainstream rock
- Affiliations: United Stations Radio Networks; Carolina Panthers Radio Network

Ownership
- Owner: Lynn Martin; (L. M. Communications Of South Carolina, Inc.)
- Sister stations: WCOO

History
- First air date: July 4, 1988

Technical information
- Licensing authority: FCC
- Facility ID: 36139
- Class: C2
- ERP: 23,000 watts
- HAAT: 199 meters (653 ft)
- Transmitter coordinates: 32°47′56.00″N 79°53′50.00″W

Links
- Public license information: Public file; LMS
- Webcast: Listen Live
- Website: my98rock.com

WYBB (98.1 FM "98 Rock") is a commercial radio station licensed to Folly Beach, South Carolina and serving the Charleston metropolitan area and the South Carolina Lowcountry. It broadcasts a mainstream rock radio format and is owned by L. M. Communications of South Carolina, Inc. The radio studios and offices are on Windermere Boulevard in Charleston west of the Ashley River. On weekday mornings, WYBB carries the syndicated Bubba The Love Sponge show from Florida.

WYBB has an effective radiated power (ERP) of 23,000 watts. The transmitter site is on Magrath Darby Boulevard in Mount Pleasant, east of the Cooper River.

== Station history ==
=== 98 Rock ===
On July 4, 1988, WYBB signed on with an Album Rock format. Owner L. M. Communications had acquired the station's construction permit in 1988 before it had built. So it has owned WYBB for all its years on the air. The station was known as "98 Rock" and Lynn Martin (the initials in L.M.) served as president.

WYBB took on a more classic rock sound in the 1990s. 98 Rock was able to hold its own against newcomer classic rock station 104.5 WRFQ throughout the 1990s. DJs of the 1990s included T.K. O’Grady, Tim Stevens, Bobby Collins, and Danger Dan Elm. Charlie Kendall, the creator of "Metal Shop" was the Program Director in the mid-1990s.

=== John Boy & Billy and Howard Stern ===
In the early 2000s, 98 Rock carried the syndicated John Boy and Billy morning show from WRFX Charlotte. On April 23, 2002, 98 Rock discontinued John Boy and Billy and switched to the Howard Stern Show after competing rock station 101.7 WAVF dropped Stern.

After several years, program director Mike Allen said Stern's show was number one in the demographic Men 25–54. He also said that despite problems other stations had, advertisers were supporting Stern, and that 98 Rock used a system of delays to guard against inappropriate material.

=== 98X and Bubba the Love Sponge ===
On January 1, 2004, the station stunted with a montage of songs and clips for a day as "Sound Effects Radio". Clips of sound effects were played from 12 Midnight New Years Day until 6am on January 2, 2004. At 6 a.m., Stern came on with announcements that a big change was coming at 10 a.m. At 10 a.m. the montage was "fired" by a sound clip of Donald Trump saying the phrase "You're Fired" from "The Apprentice" TV show. At that point, WYBB began calling itself "98X." The first song on the air was "Guerrilla Radio" from Rage Against the Machine.

On October 18, 2010, the syndicated morning show Bubba The Love Sponge began airing weekdays from 6 to 10 a.m. With the addition of Bubba, 98X rebranded to "98 Rock."

In 2020, 98 Rock gained the Carolina Panthers radio rights in the Charleston area, which had long been on WSCC.
