= WQSC =

Coordinates: 32°49′07″N 79°57′43″W

- Charleston, South Carolina; United States
- Broadcast area: Charleston Metropolitan Area
- Frequency: 1340 kHz
- Branding: Classic Country 98.5 FM

Programming
- Format: Defunct (was Classic country)

Ownership
- Owner: Kirkman Broadcasting
- Sister stations: WJNI, WQNT, WTMZ, WTMZ-FM

History
- First air date: 1946; 80 years ago
- Former call signs: WHAN (1946–1958); WOKE (1958–1994)

Technical information
- Licensing authority: FCC
- Facility ID: 34590
- Class: C
- Power: 1,000 watts unlimited
- Translator: 98.5 W253BW (Charleston)

Links
- Public license information: Public file; LMS
- Webcast: Listen Live
- Website: classiccountry985.com

WQSC (1340 AM) was a commercial radio station licensed to Charleston, South Carolina. It was owned by Kirkman Broadcasting and aired a classic country format. Studios and offices were on Marksfield Drive.

WQSC transmitted with a power of 1,000 watts. Its transmitter was located off Braswell Street. Programming was also heard on FM translator W253BW on 98.5 MHz.

== History ==
=== Early years ===
WQSC first signed on in 1946 as WHAN. Harry C. Weaver (June 12, 1916 – May 30, 2001)—who had worked for The Knoxville Journal in Knoxville, Tennessee, and was part-owner of WOKE in Oak Ridge, Tennessee, and WGAP in Maryville, Tennessee—bought WHAN in 1955, changing the call letters to WOKE in 1958.

WOKE was a unique station in Charleston. Its format included "good music", local and regional sports, religious programming, and news and weather forecasts. According to local radio buff J. Douglas Donehue, three of the station's announcers—Harry Weaver, Buck Clayton, and Tennessee Weaver—were all Harry C. Weaver himself. Weaver's daily editorials began and ended in a style reminiscent of the fictional radio newsman Les Nessman from the TV show WKRP In Cincinnati. Saturdays were for sports or The Metropolitan Opera. Sunday airtime was filled with local and national religious programs. Each night, the station would sign off the air following Mr. Weaver's poetry readings.

Fifteen-year-old John "Cousin Johnny" Busbee co-hosted the station's morning show "Carolina in the Morning" with Weaver's "Buck Clayton" for two years beginning in 1979. When Busbee left for college in 1981, former evening host "Uncle" Dave Bannon took over hosting duties alongside Weaver.

The late morning program, "Talk of the Town" was directed toward housewives and homemakers and was originally hosted by Weaver's wife Ruth, and later by his daughter Kathy. For over twenty years beginning in the 1970s, operations manager Wally Momeier did the afternoon drive program "Hits and Gold Records of Yesterday and Today".

=== Ownership changes ===
Gil Kirkman, who had worked for WOKE, bought the station in 1994, and changed the call sign to the current WQSC. It began airing a sports radio format in 1994. The station moved to new facilities and the old WOKE studios were occupied by an insurance agency in 1999.

Don Imus's syndicated morning show was heard on WQSC prior to April 2007. It was broadcast from New York City.

Talk show hosts heard on WQSC included Bill Bennett, Dennis Miller, Laura Ingraham and Jerry Doyle.

=== Beach Music and Talk ===
As of March 2009, the station dropped News/Talk format in favor of beach music. The mission of WQSC 1340 "The Boardwalk" was to promote, preserve, and perpetuate South Carolina's popular music known as "beach music" and the South Carolina state dance "The Carolina Shag".

On July 31, 2012, WQSC changed its format back to news/talk with Dave Solomon as the main station imaging voice. Charleston Veteran Rocky D was chosen for afternoons at its launch. Bryan Crabtree, a veteran real estate agent and news/talk broadcaster formerly with WTMA joined on June 24, 2013, to host mornings.

WQSC and former simulcast partner WJKB previously aired a local morning news and interview show called The Morning Report with Jay Harper and John Dixon. The rest of the weekday schedule was made up of nationally syndicated talk shows, including Laura Ingraham, Dennis Prager, Todd Schnitt, Jerry Doyle, Jim Bohannon, Overnight America with Jon Grayson, America in The Morning and This Morning, America's First News with Gordon Deal. National news is supplied at the beginning of each hour by CBS Radio News.

=== Sports and Classic Country ===
On December 6, 2016, WQSC changed its format from news/talk to sports, branded as "98.5 The Sports Zone" (simulcasting FM translator W243CO/98.5—Charleston, now W253BW).

On August 17, 2020, the sports format known as "The Zone" was moved to WTMZ 910 AM Charleston. WQSC flipped to classic country, branded as "98.5 WQSC".

The Federal Communications Commission cancelled the station’s license on December 10, 2025.
