= Sewee Mound =

Archaeological site in South Carolina, United States

- U.S. National Register of Historic Places
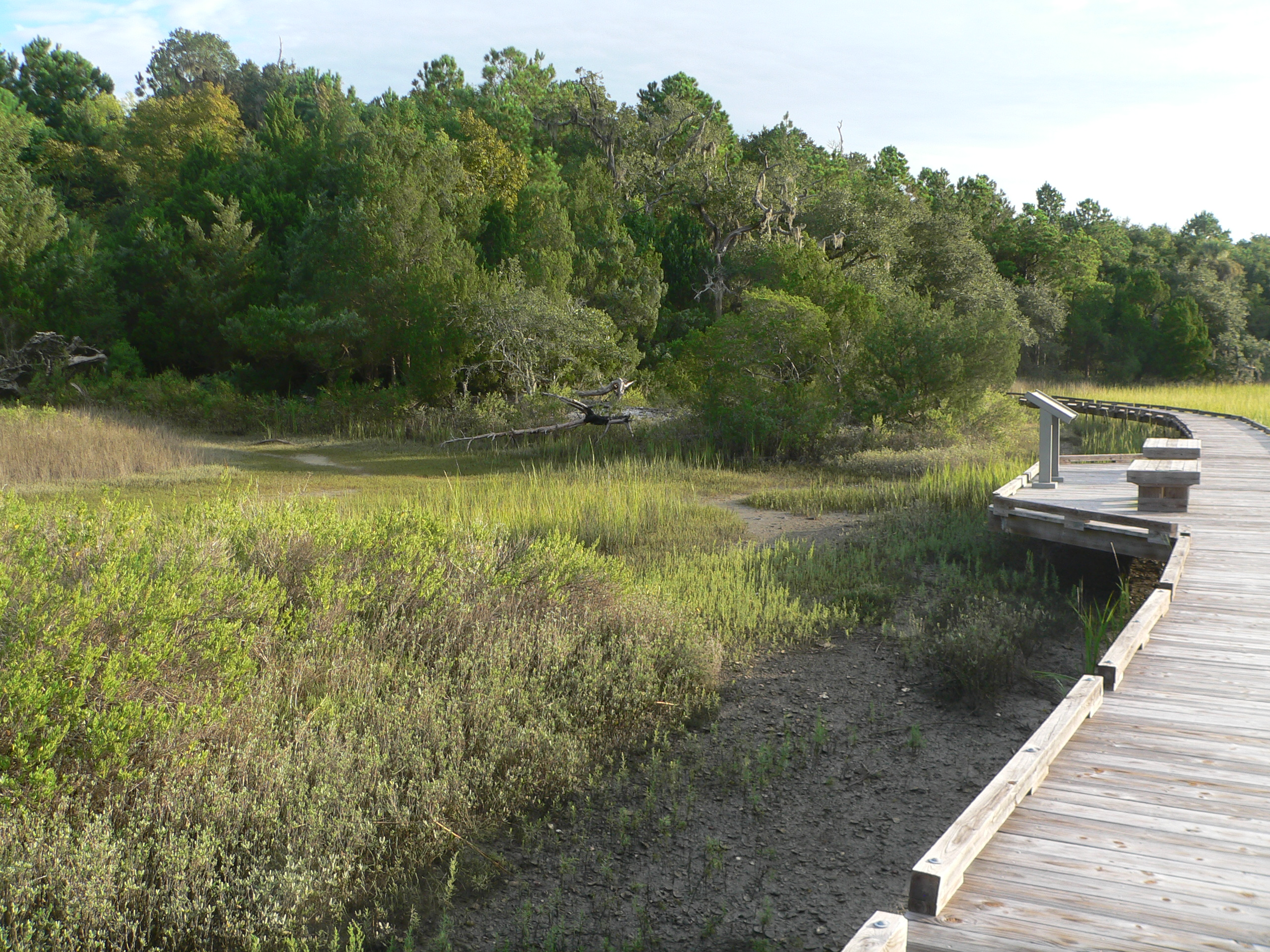
- Sewee Shell Ring, September 2011

- Location within South Carolina Location within the United States
- Location: Salt Pond Road (FS Road 243), Awendaw, South Carolina
- Coordinates: 32°59′48″N 79°36′37″W
- Area: 1 acre (0.40 ha)
- MPS: Historic Resources of the Late Archaic-Early Woodland Period Shell Rings of South Carolina, ca. 1,000-2,200 years B.C
- NRHP reference No.: 70000571
- Added to NRHP: October 15, 1970

Sewee Mound (38CH45), also known as the Old Fort, is a historic mound located near Awendaw, South Carolina. It is one of 20 or more prehistoric shell rings located from the central coast of South Carolina to the central coast of Georgia. On average, it measures 149 feet in diameter and stands 10 feet high. The midden is largely composed of oyster shell. A smaller midden is located nearby.

It was listed on the National Register of Historic Places in 1970.
