= Lincoln High School (McClellanville, South Carolina) =

High school in McClellanville, South Carolina, U.S.

Coordinates: 33°5′29″N 79°27′20″W

Lincoln High School (LHS) was a school in McClellanville, in rural Charleston County. It was a part of the Charleston County School District.

LHS had an enrollment of 260 students. It was founded in 1954. Starting in the 2014 school year, Lincoln High School became a grade six through 12 high school.

Lincoln High School closed after the 2015–2016 school year.

In 2016 school district staff stated that they were considering having a new Lincoln High School built in Awendaw.
