= WGWG =

Television station in Charleston, South Carolina

ATSC 3.0 station

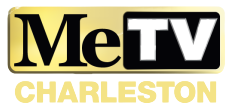
- Charleston, South Carolina; United States
- Channels: Digital: 34 (UHF); Virtual: 4
- Branding: MeTV Charleston

Programming
- Affiliations: 4.1: MeTV; for others, see § Subchannels

Ownership
- Owner: Howard Stirk Holdings; (HSH Charleston (WCIV) Licensee, LLC)

History
- First air date: October 23, 1962
- Former call signs: WCIV (1962–2014); WMMP (2014–2015)
- Former channel numbers: Analog: 4 (VHF, 1962–2009)
- Former affiliations: NBC (1962–1996); ABC (1996–2014); ZUUS Country (2014–2015); Heroes & Icons (2015−2022)
- Call sign meaning: Graham Williams Group (consulting firm co-owned by HSH owner Armstrong Williams)'

Technical information
- Licensing authority: FCC
- Facility ID: 21536
- ERP: 630 kW
- HAAT: 522 m (1,713 ft)
- Transmitter coordinates: 32°55′29″N 79°41′57″W

Links
- Public license information: Public file; LMS
- Website: www.howardstirkholdings.com/stations

WGWG (channel 4) is a television station in Charleston, South Carolina, United States, affiliated with the digital multicast network MeTV. The station is owned by Howard Stirk Holdings. WGWG's transmitter is located near Awendaw, South Carolina.

From 1962 through 2014, what is now WGWG was the original home of WCIV, and had been Charleston's ABC affiliate since 1996; however, in August 2014, WCIV owner Allbritton Communications was acquired by Sinclair Broadcast Group, owner of MyNetworkTV affiliate WMMP (channel 36) and operator of Fox affiliate WTAT-TV (channel 24, owned by Cunningham Broadcasting). Due to ownership conflicts with WMMP and WTAT, and a recent crackdown on joint sales agreements by the Federal Communications Commission (FCC), Sinclair elected to sell the WCIV channel 4 license to Howard Stirk Holdings, and moved WCIV's ABC programming and news operation to a subchannel of WMMP's channel 36 signal. At the same time, the two stations also switched call signs, with WCIV moving to channel 36 and channel 4 becoming the new WMMP, though the MyNetworkTV affiliation remains on channel 36.1 and did not move to channel 4.

The FCC approved HSH Charleston's purchase of channel 4 on December 4, 2014; the call letters became WGWG on March 11, 2015. Howard Stirk Holdings operates WGWG independently of WCIV and WTAT, and has not entered into a local marketing agreement with Sinclair.

== History ==
WGWG began operations on October 23, 1962, as WCIV, the third commercial outlet in Charleston. The original license was granted to WTMA-TV but the call letters were later changed to WCIV before it signed on. It took the NBC affiliation from WCBD-TV (known as WUSN-TV at the time), leaving that station to become a full-time ABC affiliate. The station was originally owned by First Charleston Corporation, led by Harold E. Anderson, who also owned WCCA-TV in Columbia and WCCB-TV in Montgomery, it was later sold in 1966 to the Washington Star Company. In 1976, businessman Joe Allbritton bought the Star and sold off the non-television assets in 1978 to form Allbritton Communications.

In May 1994, Birmingham ABC affiliate WBRC was sold to New World Communications, which signed an affiliation agreement with eleven other stations which would become Fox affiliates. WBRC, along with Piedmont Triad ABC affiliate WGHP, were placed in a blind trust in the fall of 1994, as the Federal Communications Commission (FCC) prohibited a company from owning more than twelve television stations at the time. Both stations were sold to Fox directly in July 1995, but Fox was forced to run WBRC as an ABC affiliate for over a year after the sale, as WBRC's affiliation contract with ABC did not expire until August 1996. Before WBRC became a Fox owned-and-operated station, Allbritton purchased WCFT-TV and WJSU-TV, and made them full power satellites of WBMA-LP; this prompted Allbritton to sign a groupwide affiliation deal with ABC which caused WCIV and Brunswick sister station WBSG-TV (now Ion Television O&O WPXC-TV) to become ABC affiliates. The latter had joined ABC as a semi-satellite of WJXX, which replaced WJKS as Jacksonville's ABC affiliate upon its 1997 sign-on). WCIV became an ABC affiliate on August 19, 1996; the NBC affiliation subsequently returned to WCBD on that day.

=== Sale to Howard Stirk Holdings; ABC and MeTV move to channel 36 ===
On July 29, 2013, Allbritton Communications announced that it would sell its entire television group, including WCIV, to Sinclair. As part of the deal, Sinclair was planning to sell the license assets of WMMP to Howard Stirk Holdings (owned by conservative talk show host Armstrong Williams), but would still operate the station through shared services and joint sales agreements. However, in December 2013, FCC Video Division Chief Barbara Kreisman ruled that "the proposed transactions would result in the elimination of the grandfathered status of certain local marketing agreements and thus cause the transactions to violate our local TV ownership rules."

While Sinclair attempted to sell WMMP and planned to terminate an SSA with the Cunningham-owned Fox affiliate WTAT, as well as foregoing any operational or financial agreements with the buyers of the stations being sold to other parties, on May 29, 2014, Sinclair informed the FCC that it had not found a buyer for WMMP and proposed surrendering the WCIV broadcast license; through the use of multicasting, WMMP would both carry its existing programming and inherit WCIV's ABC affiliation, syndicated programming, and news operation. Sinclair opted to retain WMMP because its facilities are superior to those of WCIV. However, following the closure of the Allbritton deal, Sinclair reached a deal to sell WCIV's license to Howard Stirk Holdings, and offer it studio space at WMMP's existing facilities.

The transition process began on September 25, 2014, as a simulcast of WCIV was added to WMMP's second subchannel, along with MeTV on 36.3 (replacing ZUUS Country on that channel), and MyTV Charleston remaining on 36.1. The two stations then swapped licenses four days later; WCIV's call sign was moved to the WMMP license and virtual channel 36, while WMMP's call sign was moved to the WCIV license which would be sold to Howard Stirk Holdings. The original WCIV signal went silent on September 30, 2014, making ABC exclusive to WCIV-DT2. As of October 8, channel 4 had returned to the air with programming from the ZUUS Country network, which had been displaced on 36.3 by WCIV's former DT2 affiliation, MeTV. On March 11, 2015, WMMP changed its call letters to WGWG.

On August 1, 2015, the station switched its primary affiliation to Heroes & Icons. On August 2, 2016, the station launched its 4.2 subchannel, affiliated with Decades. On September 12, 2022, the station switched its primary affiliation to MeTV, with Heroes & Icons moving to the fifth subchannel. This marked the first time MeTV aired on WGWG since 2014, when the network moved to WCIV-DT3. That subchannel switched to Stadium.

== Technical information ==
=== Subchannels ===
The station's ATSC 1.0 channels are carried on the multiplexed signals of other Charleston television stations:

Subchannels provided by WGWG (ATSC 1.0)
Subchannel	Res.	Short name	Programming	ATSC 1.0 host
4.1	720p	WGWG-HI	MeTV	WTAT-TV
4.2	720p	WGWGDEC	Catchy Comedy	WCSC-TV
4.3	480i	Antenna	Antenna TV	WCIV
4.4	480i	StartTV	Start TV	WCBD-TV
4.5	480i	H&I	Heroes & Icons	WCIV

In exchange, the market's main commercial stations are broadcast in ATSC 3.0 on this multiplex:

Subchannels of WGWG (ATSC 3.0)
Subchannel	Short name	Programming
2.1	WCBD	NBC (WCBD-TV)
4.1	WGWG	MeTV
5.1	WCSC	CBS (WCSC-TV)
24.1	WTAT	Fox (WTAT-TV)
36.10	T2	T2
36.11	PBTV	Pickleballtv
36.2	WCIV	ABC (WCIV)

Subchannel broadcast with digital rights management
Subchannel streamed via the Internet

On October 1, 2011, WCIV added MeTV on digital subchannel 4.2, replacing The Local AccuWeather Channel. With the transition to WMMP, 4.2's signal moved to 36.3.

=== Analog-to-digital conversion ===
WGWG (as WCIV) shut down its analog signal, over VHF channel 4, on June 12, 2009, as part of the federally mandated transition from analog to digital television. The station's digital signal remained on its pre-transition UHF channel 34, using virtual channel 4.
