= WTAT-TV =

Television station in Charleston, South Carolina

- Charleston, South Carolina; United States
- Channels: Digital: 17 (UHF); Virtual: 24
- Branding: Fox 24

Programming
- Affiliations: 24.1: Fox; for others, see § Subchannels

Ownership
- Owner: Cunningham Broadcasting; (WTAT Licensee, LLC)
- Sister stations: WCIV (news share agreement)

History
- First air date: September 7, 1985
- Former channel numbers: Analog: 24 (UHF, 1985–2009); Digital: 40 (UHF, until 2009), 24 (UHF, 2009–2019), 25 (UHF, temporary share with WCIV, 2019–2020)
- Former affiliations: Independent (1985–1986); UPN (secondary, 1995–1997)
- Call sign meaning: Terry A. Trousdale (original owner)

Technical information
- Licensing authority: FCC
- Facility ID: 416
- ERP: 450 kW
- HAAT: 599.4 m (1,967 ft)
- Transmitter coordinates: 32°56′25″N 79°41′44″W

Links
- Public license information: Public file; LMS
- Website: foxcharleston.com

WTAT-TV (channel 24) is a television station in Charleston, South Carolina, United States, affiliated with the Fox network. The station is owned by Cunningham Broadcasting, a partner company of the Sinclair Broadcast Group. However, although Sinclair effectively owns WTAT-TV, making it a de facto sister to dual MyNetworkTV/ABC affiliate WCIV (channel 36), WTAT-TV is operated outright by Cunningham, and is one of only two Cunningham stations not operated by Sinclair. WTAT-TV's studios are located on Arco Lane in North Charleston, and its transmitter is located in Awendaw, South Carolina.

== History ==
The station began operations on September 7, 1985, as Charleston's first independent station, under the ownership of Charleston Television Community Ltd., a local group led by Terry Trousdale, who also had the construction permit for the station. It aired an analog signal on UHF channel 24 from a transmitter near Awendaw. On October 9, 1986, as part of a deal between WTAT's owner and News Corporation, it became a charter affiliate of the fledgling Fox network. WTAT would have been the obvious choice as Charleston's Fox affiliate even without that affiliation deal, as it was the area's only general-entertainment independent station at the time.

In 1987, Charleston Television Community Ltd. sold WTAT-TV to Act III Broadcasting, owner of WNRW-TV in Winston-Salem, North Carolina, for $3.3–3.7 million; this was Act III's second station acquisition.

Abry Communications bought the Act III group in 1995, and formed Sullivan Broadcasting to operate the stations. WTAT carried UPN as a secondary affiliation from 1995 until 1997 when former WB affiliate WMMP joined UPN. In 1998, Sullivan Broadcasting sold its stations to Sinclair Broadcast Group. However, earlier that year, Sinclair acquired WMMP from Max Media. As a result, Sinclair sold WTAT-TV, along with WRGT-TV and WVAH-TV to Glencairn, Ltd. That company was owned by Edwin Edwards, a former Sinclair executive, and appeared to be a minority-owned company. However, nearly all of Glencairn's stock was controlled by the Smith family, founders of Sinclair. In effect, Sinclair now had a duopoly in the Charleston market in violation of FCC regulations. Glencairn and Sinclair further circumvented the rules by crafting a local marketing agreement with WMMP as the senior partner, allowing Sinclair to continue operating WTAT.

Sinclair tried to acquire Glencairn's stations outright in 2001. It could not legally own both WTAT and WMMP because Charleston has only six full-power stations—too few to legally permit a duopoly. Although WTAT was longer-established, Sinclair opted to keep WMMP instead of acquiring WTAT and selling WMMP to another company.

In 2001, the FCC fined Sinclair $40,000 for illegally controlling Glencairn. Later that year, it was renamed Cunningham Broadcasting. However, nearly all of Cunningham's stock is still controlled by trusts in the names of the children of the Smith brothers. Then as now, all of Cunningham's stations are located in markets where Sinclair cannot legally form a duopoly, and are operated by Sinclair stations via LMAs. Glencairn, and later Cunningham, have been accused of serving as a shell corporation that allows Sinclair to circumvent FCC ownership rules. On May 15, 2012, Sinclair and Fox agreed to a five-year extension of the network's affiliation agreement with Sinclair's 19 Fox stations, including WTAT, allowing them to continue carrying Fox programming until at least 2017.

On March 20, 2014, as part of a restructuring of Sinclair's August 2013 deal to purchase Allbritton Communications (owner of ABC affiliate WCIV, then on channel 4) in order to address ownership conflicts with the deal involving WMMP's local marketing agreement with WTAT, Sinclair announced that it planned to terminate the shared services agreement with Cunningham Broadcasting (which would have made WTAT the first Cunningham station in which Sinclair would not hold any operational interest). Cunningham, which was to have acquired the non-license assets of WTAT, sought a shared services agreement with the prospective owner of WMMP, which Sinclair was to have sold in order to receive approval of its purchase of WCIV. This plan never materialized as Sinclair retained WMMP (to which Sinclair moved WCIV's ABC affiliation and call sign), and WTAT continued to be operated by Sinclair until some point in 2019 or 2020, when Cunningham took full control of the station although it continued its news share agreement with WCIV.

== News operation ==
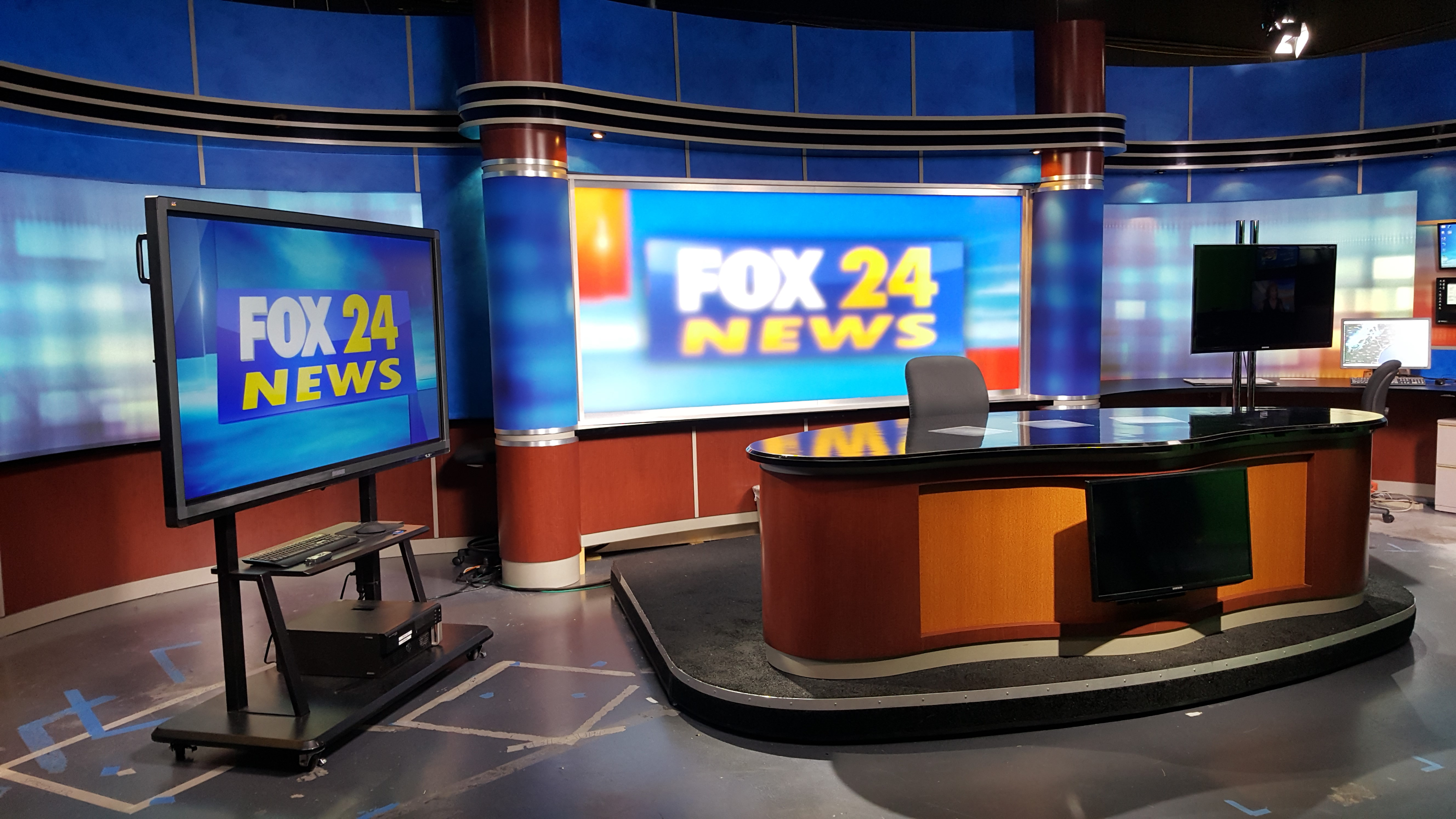
WTAT news set used after news production moved from WCSC to WCIV.

In the early-1990s, Fox required most of its major market affiliates to add local newscasts or face disaffiliation. As a result, WTAT entered into a news share agreement with CBS affiliate WCSC-TV (channel 5, then owned by Crump Communications). The partnership resulted in a nightly half-hour prime time broadcast to debut on WTAT.

That program was one of the first prime time newscasts in South Carolina along with fellow Fox affiliate WACH in Columbia which established a similar outsourcing arrangement with NBC affiliate WIS in that market several years later. Eventually, an hour-long extension of WCSC's weekday morning show was added to WTAT. Known as The Fox 24 News at 7, this newscast was seen until 8 a.m.

WTAT's shows had no WCSC branding and originated from the CBS affiliate's studios on Charlie Hall Boulevard in Charleston's West Ashley section along Glenn McConnell Parkway. The music package and graphics scheme used on all newscasts could be seen on other Sinclair-owned television stations that operated their own in-house news departments. Although WTAT featured the majority of WCSC's on-air personnel, this station maintained a separate second news anchor on weeknights that also contributed to WCSC. This outlet was one of many company-owned stations (including WGME, WICS, WLOS, and KGAN along with others) that did not participate in the wider implementation of Sinclair's now-defunct, controversial News Central format. This centralized operation had national news segments, all weather forecasts, and some sports coverage based at company headquarters on Beaver Dam Road in Hunt Valley, Maryland that supplemented local content at most of Sinclair's in-house news departments. WTAT did air The Point (a one-minute conservative political commentary) that was also controversial and a requirement of all company-owned stations with newscasts until the series was discontinued in December 2006.

On September 29, 2008, WCSC became the first television outlet in Charleston to offer newscasts in high definition. The upgrade included new custom Raycom Media corporate graphics, a re-designed HD logo, and updated music package. The WTAT broadcasts at that time, however, were still only aired in pillarboxed 4:3 standard definition as the station lacked a high definition-capable master control at its separate facility in order to receive the newscast in HD.

On August 31, 2009, the weeknight prime time show at 10 was expanded to an hour while the weekend edition remained 35 minutes in length. It would not be until January 24, 2011, when the station completed a master control upgrade allowing the reception and transmission of local programming, including local news, in high definition. During weather forecasts, WTAT featured WCSC's own Doppler weather radar in addition to NOAA's National Weather Service radar images from several regional sites.

Since January 1, 2016, WTAT's newscasts have been produced by WCIV. This change also came with a new anchor for the 10 p.m. news hour and an expanded morning newscast (7–9 a.m.).

On January 9, 2017, WTAT's newscasts expanded to include a traditional newscast at 6:30 p.m. and a news magazine-type program at 11 p.m. (Fox 24 News Now) which were broadcast from the station's studios on Arco Lane in North Charleston.

== Technical information ==
=== Subchannels ===
The station's signal is multiplexed:

Subchannels of WTAT-TV
Subchannel	Res.	Short name	Programming
24.1	720p	WTATFOX	Fox
24.2	480i	CrimeTV	True Crime Network
24.3	480i	COMET	Comet
24.4	480i	Charge!	Charge
24.5	480i	ROAR	Roar
4.1	720p	MeTV	MeTV (WGWG)

Broadcast on behalf of another station

=== Analog-to-digital conversion ===
WTAT-TV shut down its analog signal, over UHF channel 24, on February 17, 2009, to conclude the federally mandated transition from analog to digital television. The station's digital signal relocated from its pre-transition UHF channel 40 to channel 24.
