= Bill Sharpe (journalist) =

American news anchor

William Herschel Sharpe, Jr. (born 1950) was the lead anchor on WCSC-TV in Charleston, South Carolina. He had been with the station since October 1973. Sharpe retired in 2021 after 48 years at WCSC-TV. He has three children, Hayle Kathryn Sharpe, Harper Danielle-Augusta Sharpe, and William Herschel Sharpe III. He is married to Katherine McGee Thompson Sharpe, and is step father to Grey McGee Thompson, James Hunter Thompson, and Emma Southerland Thompson.

== Education ==
A native of the St. Andrews area in Charleston, he graduated from St. Andrews High School in the city, moving to Atlanta, where he attended Emory University, receiving a degree in English literature with a minor in French.

== Awards and recognition ==
Sharpe has received numerous awards including for best newscast,back to back anchor of the year awards in his division in North and South Carolina, as well as for feature and investigative reporting and anchored a special on Hurricane Hugo which received an Emmy and a Peabody Award. Sharpe's broadcast team received regional Emmy Award nominations in four out of six years between 2002 and 2007. On a less serious note, Sharpe won a 2008 Best of Charleston award from the Charleston City Paper for "Best Ted Baxter Impression".

== Obstruction of justice charge ==
In 1983, Sharpe and three co-workers were arrested and subsequently cleared of obstruction of justice charges after WCSC-TV broadcast the photograph of a multiple murder suspect against the wishes of law enforcement authorities. Despite their release, the Charleston County Solicitor refused to acknowledge the validity of the claim that their conduct was protected by the First Amendment.
