= WXST =

Radio station in Hollywood, South Carolina

- Hollywood, South Carolina; United States
- Broadcast area: Charleston metropolitan area; South Carolina Lowcountry
- Frequency: 99.7 MHz (HD Radio)
- Branding: Star 99.7

Programming
- Format: Urban adult contemporary
- Subchannels: HD2: Mainstream urban; HD3: Urban Gospel (WSPO)
- Affiliations: Premiere Networks

Ownership
- Owner: Saga Communications; (Saga South Communications, LLC)
- Sister stations: WAVF; WCKN; WMXZ; WSPO

History
- First air date: July 15, 1988
- Former call signs: WHTK (1988–1993); WNCK (1993–1994, 1994–1995); WLOW (1994); WHBZ (1995–2001); WJZX (2001–2003)

Technical information
- Licensing authority: FCC
- Facility ID: 3969
- Class: C1
- ERP: 70,000 watts
- HAAT: 238 meters (781 ft)
- Transmitter coordinates: 32°49′4.00″N 79°50′8.00″W
- Translator: HD2: 99.3 W257BQ (Charleston)

Links
- Public license information: Public file; LMS
- Webcast: Listen live
- Website: www.star997.com

WXST (99.7 FM, "Star 99.7") is a commercial radio station licensed to Hollywood, South Carolina, United States, and serving the Charleston metropolitan area and the South Carolina Lowcountry. It airs an urban adult contemporary format and is owned by Saga Communications as part of its Charleston Radio Group. The studios are on Clements Ferry Road in Charleston.

The transmitter tower is on Venning Road in Mount Pleasant. WXST broadcasts in HD Radio: the HD2 digital subchannel carries an urban contemporary format, which feeds FM translator W257BQ (99.3 FM) while the HD3 subchannel is a simulcast of WSPO.

== History ==
=== WHTK Top 40 ===
The station signed on the air on July 15, 1988. The original call sign was WHTK. At the time, it was licensed to Port Royal, with studios located near the town of Bluffton. It was owned by Barnicle Broadcasting and featured a Top 40 - CHR format targeting nearby Hilton Head, Beaufort and Savannah, Georgia.

Although ratings were good in its home market of Hilton Head and Beaufort, the station faced stiff competition from competitor WZAT in the Savannah market as well as a weak signal in that area. WHTK played a major role during Hurricane Hugo in 1989. It was one of the few radio stations that was able to stay on the air for most of the storm and broadcast information to the Lowcountry.

=== WNCK Country ===
In January 1993, the station dropped its CHR format for Country under the new call letters of WNCK as "K99.7". This lasted less than a year before the station changed formats again to Adult Standards as WLOW, which stood for "Low" Country. It moved down the dial from 106.9 to 99.7 MHz.

WLOW eventually moved to 107.9 within a year's time and 99.7 once again became WNCK with a Talk format. It eventually gave way to a Contemporary Christian format before going dark in May 1995.

=== WHBZ Beach music ===
By the Summer of 1995, it was sold to Baker Broadcasting, which changed the station to a syndicated Beach Music format under the WHBZ call letters as "The Breeze." It was paired with WWBZ in McClellanville, South Carolina and adding WLXC in Columbia, South Carolina in early 1996.

By 2001, Baker Broadcasting sold WHBZ to Apex Broadcasting, which dropped the simulcast with WWBZ and flipped the station to a simulcast with WSIS. Then it briefly had an All-Comedy format, then a brief satellite-fed Classic rock format with local shows on the weekend. The station became Smooth Jazz under the WJZX call letters.

During this time, the station made a long-planned move into the Charleston radio market by changing its city of license to Hollywood and moving its tower to Mount Pleasant, which was completed in 2003.

=== WXST Urban AC ===
When the move into the Charleston radio market was completed in 1993, the station changed its format again. This time it was urban adult contemporary, using the call sign WXST. It adopted the moniker "Star 99.7".

On September 6, 2017, the station was sold to Saga Communications. Saga kept the format as Urban AC.
