= WCIV =

Television station in Charleston, South Carolina

- Charleston, South Carolina; United States
- Channels: Digital: 25 (UHF); Virtual: 36
- Branding: MyTV Charleston; ABC 4; ABC News 4 (36.2)

Programming
- Affiliations: 36.1: Independent with MyNetworkTV; 36.2: ABC; 36.3: The Nest

Ownership
- Owner: Sinclair Broadcast Group; (WMMP Licensee L.P.)
- Sister stations: WTAT-TV (news share agreement)

History
- Founded: August 25, 1988
- First air date: December 1, 1992
- Former call signs: WCTP (1992–1995); WBNU (1995–1997); WMMP (1997–2014)
- Former channel numbers: Analog: 36 (UHF, 1992–2009); Digital: 35 (UHF, 2002–2009), 36 (UHF, 2009–2019)
- Former affiliations: Independent (1992–1995); The WB (1995–1997); UPN (1997–2006); Fox (temporary host for WTAT-TV, 2019–2020); MeTV (36.3, 2014−2022)
- Call sign meaning: Charleston IV; (Roman numeral 4; former analog channel number of what is now WGWG)

Technical information
- Licensing authority: FCC
- Facility ID: 9015
- ERP: 1,000 kW
- HAAT: 583.3 m (1,914 ft)
- Transmitter coordinates: 32°56′25″N 79°41′44″W

Links
- Public license information: Public file; LMS
- Website: mytvcharleston.com; abcnews4.com

WCIV (channel 36) is a television station in Charleston, South Carolina, United States. Its primary channel is programmed as an independent station with a secondary affiliation with MyNetworkTV, while its second subchannel is affiliated with ABC. The station is owned by Sinclair Broadcast Group, and maintains studios on Allbritton Boulevard along US 17/701 (Johnnie Dodds Boulevard) in Mount Pleasant and a transmitter in Awendaw, South Carolina.

In September 2014, due to complications arising from Sinclair's acquisition of the original WCIV (channel 4) from its previous owner, Allbritton Communications, WCIV's programming and ABC affiliation was moved onto the second digital subchannel of Sinclair's existing station in the market, MyNetworkTV affiliate WMMP. WCIV's license was sold to Howard Stirk Holdings in order to form a new station using its existing facilities. In preparation for the sale, the WCIV and WMMP intellectual units swapped signals on September 30, 2014, with WCIV moving to WMMP's channel 36 signal and WMMP moving to WCIV's channel 34 signal respectively. WMMP then began carrying programming from ZUUS Country, and has since changed its calls to WGWG.

== History ==
The current WCIV first began operations on December 1, 1992, as WCTP, an independent station. It began after a nine-month delay in operations with test programs. It joined The WB as a charter affiliate on January 11, 1995. On November 20, it changed its calls to WBNU. On January 6, 1997, Max Media Properties (a company partially related to the present-day Max Media) bought the station, changed its calls to WMMP, and switched its affiliation to UPN. Only a year later, Max Media sold WMMP to Sinclair Broadcast Group, giving the station its third owner in as many years. Later that year, Sinclair bought out Sullivan Broadcasting, owners of Fox affiliate WTAT-TV (channel 24), and all licensee assets were given to Glencairn Ltd, with Sinclair continuing to own through a local marketing agreement (LMA).

When Sinclair tried to acquire Sullivan's stations outright in 2001, it could not legally keep both WMMP and WTAT because Charleston has only six full-power stations (too few to legally permit a duopoly). Although WTAT was longer-established, Sinclair opted to keep WMMP and sold WTAT to Glencairn, Ltd. That company was owned by Edwin Edwards, a former Sinclair executive, and appeared to be a minority-owned company. However, nearly all of Glencairn's stock was controlled by the Smith family founders of Sinclair. In effect, the company now had a duopoly in the Charleston market which was a violation of Federal Communications Commission (FCC) regulations. Glencairn and Sinclair further circumvented the rules by crafting a local marketing agreement between the two stations, with WMMP as senior partner–one of the few known instances in which a Big Four affiliate was the junior partner to a WB or UPN affiliate.

In 2001, the FCC fined Sinclair $40,000 for illegally controlling Glencairn. Later that year, it was renamed Cunningham Broadcasting. However, nearly all of Cunningham's stock is still controlled by trusts in the names of the children of the Smith brothers, so for all intents and purposes Sinclair still has a duopoly in Charleston. Glencairn and Cunningham have been accused of serving as a shell corporation which Sinclair has been using for the purpose of circumventing FCC ownership rules. Prior to its 2007 shutdown, WMMP aired The Tube on its second digital subchannel.

Soon after Fox announced the formation of MyNetworkTV, Sinclair announced that most of its WB and UPN affiliates, including WMMP, would affiliate with that network. Since the launch of MyNetworkTV in 2006, WMMP has aired any Fox programming in the event WTAT preempts the network for weather/emergency updates or local specials.

=== ABC and MeTV move to channel 36 digital subchannels ===
On July 29, 2013, Allbritton Communications announced that it would sell its entire television group, including WCIV, to the Sinclair Broadcast Group. As part of the deal, Sinclair intended to sell WMMP's license assets, but would still operate that station through shared services and joint sales agreements. On December 6, 2013, the FCC informed Sinclair that applications related to the deal need to be "amended or withdrawn" since WMMP would retain its local marketing agreement with WTAT. As originally structured, the deal would have effectively created a new LMA between WCIV and WTAT, even though the FCC had ruled in 1999 that such agreements made after November 5, 1996, covering more than 15% of the broadcast day would count toward the ownership limits for the brokering station's owner. In addition, the existing LMA between WMMP and WTAT dates to July 1, 1998, and thus cannot be grandfathered.

On March 20, 2014, as part of a restructuring of the Sinclair-Allbritton deal in order to address these ownership conflicts, Sinclair announced that it would terminate its shared services agreement with Cunningham Broadcasting, under which Sinclair owned all of WTAT's assets except the FCC license. Under this new deal, Sinclair would have retained the longer-established WCIV and sold WMMP to a new owner. Cunningham would acquire the non-license assets of WTAT, and seek a shared services agreement with the prospective owner of WMMP. On May 29, 2014, Sinclair informed the FCC that it had not found a buyer for WMMP and proposed surrendering WCIV's license. Had WCIV gone dark, WMMP would have picked up WCIV's ABC affiliation, syndicated programming, and news operation, while WMMP's existing programming (including MyNetworkTV) would move to its digital subchannel. Sinclair opted to retain WMMP because its facilities were superior to those of WCIV. Sinclair's acquisition of Allbritton was completed on August 1, 2014.

On September 11, 2014, Sinclair filed to have WCIV's license assets sold to Howard Stirk Holdings, owned by conservative commentator Armstrong Williams, for $50,000, averting a complete shutdown of the station. Unlike Howard Stirk Holdings' other stations, which are operated by Sinclair but with input from HSH in regards to programming (such as the carriage of public affairs programs produced by Williams, and syndicated programming of interest to minority audiences), WCIV would be operated independently from WMMP, and Sinclair would not enter into a shared services agreement or similar to operate the station. However, as part of the sale, Sinclair agreed to provide studio space for the station at WMMP's existing facilities. Williams explained that he hoped to "continue some of the wonderful business relationships we have with [Sinclair]" through the deal.

On September 25, in preparation for the signal switch, a simulcast of WCIV was added to WMMP's second digital subchannel, along with MeTV on 36.3, replacing ZUUS Country on that channel. The two stations then swapped licenses four days later; WCIV's call sign was moved to the WMMP license and virtual channel 36, while WMMP's call sign and virtual channel 4 was moved to the WCIV license which was sold to Howard Stirk Holdings. Following the swap, ZUUS Country was moved to WMMP 4.1 as interim programming during the transition to Howard Stirk Holdings ownership. MeTV later moved to WGWG's main subchannel in September 2022, and WCIV-DT3 switched to Stadium.

In April 2025, WCIV announced an agreement with the Charleston RiverDogs of Minor League Baseball to air all Sunday home games.

== Newscasts ==
WCIV-DT2 alternate logo

WCIV produces a daily lifestyle and entertainment program called Lowcountry Live. The show features many popular regular segments and contributors including "Makeover Monday" and "Louis' Kids". LCL, as it is often referred to, also features a plethora of local artists, chefs, musicians, and authors. The show airs Monday through Friday mornings at 10 for an hour. This broadcast serves as a midday program during the week for WCIV because it does not offer news at noon unlike most other ABC affiliates. A 5 p.m. weekday newscast was inaugurated on April 20, 2015. Along with CBS affiliate WCSC-TV, this station offers local news weeknights at 7. WCIV (on channel 4) debuted its newscasts in high definition on Saturday, October 15, 2011, becoming the second in the Lowcountry and the last Allbritton-owned station to switch to HD. On January 1, 2016, WCIV began production of WTAT-TV's newscast.

== Technical information ==
=== Subchannels ===
The station's signal is multiplexed. Both of the main WCIV channels identify on-air as "WCIV Charleston" without their numerical "-DTx" suffix:

Subchannels of WCIV
Subchannel	Res.	Short name	Programming
36.1	720p	MyTV	Main WCIV programming
36.2	720p	ABC	ABC
36.3	480i	TheNest	The Nest
4.3	480i	Antenna	Antenna TV (WGWG)
4.5	480i	H&I	Heroes & Icons (WGWG)

Broadcast on behalf of another station

=== Analog-to-digital conversion ===
WCIV (as WMMP) shut down its analog signal, over UHF channel 36, on February 17, 2009, to conclude the federally mandated transition from analog to digital television. The station's digital signal relocated from its pre-transition UHF channel 35 to channel 36.

== See also ==
- Channel 4 branded TV stations in the United States
- Channel 25 digital TV stations in the United States
- Channel 36 virtual TV stations in the United States
