= Island Eye News =

Newspaper in South Carolina, United States

The Island Eye News
- Type: Bi-weekly
- Format: Broadsheet
- Owner: Lucky Dog Publishing Company
- Website: https://luckydognews.com/the-island-eye-news

The Island Eye News is a newspaper that serves several islands around the Charleston area, including Sullivan's Island, the Isle of Palms, Dewees Island, and Goat Island in South Carolina. The newspaper started in May 2005.

The paper had an average circulation of 5,311 in 2008.

It had two websites in 2008.

It had ten employees in 2008 and it came out every other Friday.

It is published by Lucky Dog Publishing Company, and features local politics, Business, community living and outdoor activities-based news.

Publisher Lynn Pierotti, Editor Brian Sherman, Marketing Director Lori Dalton, Graphic Designer Swan Richards.
