= WWWZ =

- Summerville, South Carolina; United States
- Broadcast area: Charleston & South Carolina Lowcountry
- Frequency: 93.3 MHz
- Branding: Z93 Jamz!

Programming
- Format: Urban contemporary
- Affiliations: Premiere Networks

Ownership
- Owner: Cumulus Media; (Radio License Holding CBC, LLC)
- Sister stations: WIWF, WMGL, WSSX-FM, WTMA

History
- First air date: May 10, 1974

Technical information
- Facility ID: 61278
- Class: C2
- ERP: 50,000 watts
- HAAT: 150 meters (492 ft)
- Transmitter coordinates: 32°54′18.00″N 79°55′19.00″W

Links
- Webcast: Listen live
- Website: z93jamz.com

WWWZ (93.3 FM) is a commercial radio station licensed to Summerville, South Carolina, and serving the Charleston metropolitan area and the South Carolina Lowcountry. It is owned by Cumulus Media and broadcasts an urban contemporary radio format. Its radio studios and offices are on Faber Place Drive in North Charleston. WWWZ carries the Premiere Networks syndicated morning show from New York City, The Breakfast Club.

WWWZ has an effective radiated power (ERP) of 50,000 watts. The transmitter tower is on Radio Lane in Charleston near the Cooper River. The station often refers to Charleston by its urban nickname "Chucktown".

== Station history ==
WWWZ signed on the air May 10, 1974. It was owned by Brothers Broadcasting and offered a Freeform Progressive Rock format. The station broadcast from a mobile home studio off Hwy 61 near Summerville and was referred to as "3WZ". In 1981, WWWZ switched to a "CHUrban" rhythmic contemporary format as "The New Z93".

In summer 1999, Z93 added new hosts to "Big Mack and The All New Breakfuss Club", which finishing second in the morning ratings to WAVF's Howard Stern. Z93 had reached number one on several occasions but usually lost to WEZL. WWWZ was number one with 25-54 listeners in Fall 1999.

In Winter 2002, Z93 was number one overall and Tessa and Baby J stayed at number one in the morning with the 25-54 audience. In Spring 2002, Tessa and Baby J were number one with 18-34 listeners.
