= WCBD-TV =

Television station in Charleston, South Carolina

- Charleston, South Carolina; United States
- Channels: Digital: 20 (UHF); Virtual: 2
- Branding: WCBD News 2; News 2; Lowcountry CW (on DT2)

Programming
- Affiliations: 2.1: NBC; 2.2: CW+; for others, see § Subchannels

Ownership
- Owner: Nexstar Media Group; (Nexstar Media Inc.)

History
- First air date: September 25, 1954
- Former call signs: WUSN-TV (1954–1971)
- Former channel numbers: Analog: 2 (VHF, 1954–2009); Digital: 50 (UHF, 2000–2019)
- Former affiliations: NBC (1954–1962); ABC (secondary 1954–1962, primary 1962–1996)
- Call sign meaning: Charleston, Berkeley, Dorchester (three counties in Charleston metro); calls shared with former 70s sister station KCBD

Technical information
- Licensing authority: FCC
- Facility ID: 10587
- ERP: 779 kW
- HAAT: 581 m (1,906 ft)
- Transmitter coordinates: 32°56′25″N 79°41′44″W

Links
- Public license information: Public file; LMS
- Website: www.counton2.com

WCBD-TV (channel 2) is a television station in Charleston, South Carolina, United States, affiliated with NBC. Its second subchannel serves as an owned-and-operated station of The CW (via The CW Plus). Owned by Nexstar Media Group, WCBD-TV has studios on West Coleman Boulevard (SC 703) in Mount Pleasant, and its transmitter is located in Awendaw, South Carolina.

== History ==
The station signed on the air as WUSN-TV on September 25, 1954. The station was originally owned by Drayton Hastie. It aired an analog signal on VHF channel 2 and was originally an NBC affiliate with a secondary ABC affiliation. Hastie sold the station to Reeves Telecom in 1960. It shared ABC programming with WCSC-TV until 1962, when WCIV signed on and took the NBC affiliation. WUSN then became a full-time ABC affiliate. During the late-1950s, it was also briefly affiliated with the NTA Film Network. In 1971, Reeves then sold Channel 2 to State Telecasting Company, based in the state capital of Columbia. On November 8, 1971, the station adopted its current call letters, WCBD standing for Charleston, Berkeley, and Dorchester counties (the three counties in the Charleston metropolitan area), calls also taken to coordinate with new sister station KCBD in Lubbock, Texas. Media General bought the station from State Telecasting in 1983.

In May 1994, Great American Communications announced that it would sell four of its six television stations to New World Communications, who would subsequently announce an affiliation agreement with Fox. Two of the stations that were involved in the deal were ABC affiliates WBRC in Birmingham, Alabama, and WGHP in High Point, North Carolina. Fox was unable to purchase the two stations outright; both of them were placed in a blind trust and were sold directly to Fox in early 1995. While WGHP was able to switch to Fox in September 1995 (taking the affiliation from WXLV-TV, which affiliated with ABC), Fox had to run WBRC as an ABC affiliate for a little over a year, as that station's affiliation contract with ABC did not expire until August 31, 1996. In January 1996, ABC reached a groupwide affiliation agreement with Allbritton Communications, who had acquired WCIV in 1978; Allbritton would purchase CBS affiliates WCFT-TV in Tuscaloosa and WJSU-TV in Anniston (making them full-power satellites of Birmingham's replacement ABC affiliate, WBMA-LP, which began operations as independent station W58CK in November 1994). The affiliation deal caused WCIV and WB affiliate WBSG (now WPXC-TV) in Brunswick, Georgia, to become ABC affiliates; the latter became a satellite of Jacksonville affiliate WJXX when it signed on in February 1997. As a result of the affiliation deal, WCBD became an NBC affiliate for the second time in its history on August 19, 1996, fifteen days after that year's Olympic Games (which were carried by WCIV locally) ended.

On January 27, 2016, Media General announced that it had entered into a definite agreement to be acquired by Nexstar Broadcasting Group for $4.6 billion. The combined company would be called Nexstar Media Group and own 171 stations (including WCBD-TV). The deal was completed on January 17, 2017.

== News operation ==
WCBD spent most of the 1970s and 1980s in last place until Media General bought the station in 1983. Since then, it has been a solid runner-up to longtime leader WCSC. WCBD offers more than 30 hours of news per week. Each newscasts focus on WCBD's signature elements that have become a staple in the Lowcountry: "Storm Team 2", "CrimeTracker", "2 Your Health", "Cool School/Cool Teacher of the Week", "Count on 2 Sports", "Count on 2 Traffic" and "Count on 2 Investigators".

WCBD airs a newscast Saturday nights at 7, but unlike WCSC and WCIV, does not offer a broadcast at the same time on weeknights. The first HD telecast was on July 29, 2012, making it the last Lowcountry station to go HD. WCBD started a weekend morning newscast that airs on Saturdays and Sundays at 9 a.m. In addition to its main studios, WCBD also operates a bureau located on Assembly Street/SC 48 covering the Capitol in Columbia, an operation shared by its sister Nexstar stations in and around the state.

WCBD-DT2 has two original newscasts produced by WCBD: News 2 at 7 on the CW weekday mornings, and WCBD News 2 at 10pm on The CW on weeknights. Previously, the subchannel carried a repeat of the 6 p.m. edition.

=== Notable current on-air staff ===
- Rob Fowler (NWA and AMS Seals of Approval) – chief meteorologist

=== Notable former on-air staff ===
- Amy Robach
- Jon Robinson – 2004–2006

== Technical information ==
=== Subchannels ===
The station's signal is multiplexed:

Subchannels of WCBD-TV
Subchannel	Res.	Short name	Programming
2.1	1080i	WCBD-HD	NBC
2.2	720p	eCBD-CW	The CW Plus
2.3	480i	ION	Ion
2.4	480i	Laff	Laff
4.4	480i	StartTV	Start TV (WGWG)

Broadcast on behalf of another station

=== Analog-to-digital conversion ===
WCBD-TV shut down its analog signal, over VHF channel 2, on June 12, 2009, as part of the federally mandated transition from analog to digital television. The station's digital signal remained on its pre-transition UHF channel 50, using virtual channel 2.

== See also ==
- Channel 2 virtual TV stations in the United States
- Channel 20 digital TV stations in the United States
