= WAZS-LD =

Television station in North Charleston, South Carolina

- North Charleston, South Carolina; United States
- Channels: Digital: 29 (UHF), to move to 22 (UHF); Virtual: 29

Programming
- Affiliations: 29.1: Quiero TV; 29.2: Quiero Música

Ownership
- Owner: Norsan Communications and Management, Inc.

History
- Founded: March 13, 1996
- First air date: April 28, 2000
- Former call signs: W69DV (1996–1999); W22CN (1999–2000); WFAY-LP (January–March 2000); WTBD-LP (2000–2005)
- Call sign meaning: From radio station WAZS

Technical information
- Licensing authority: FCC
- Facility ID: 168038
- Class: LD
- ERP: 15 kW
- HAAT: 85.9 m (282 ft)
- Transmitter coordinates: 32°55′43″N 80°6′12″W

Links
- Public license information: LMS
- Website: norsanmedia.com

WAZS-LD (channel 29) is a low-power television station in North Charleston, South Carolina, United States. Owned by Norsan Communications and Management, Inc., it is a sister station to YTA TV affiliate WJNI-LD and radio station WAZS. It airs the programming of Quiero TV out of Guadalajara, Mexico.

== History ==
WTBD-LP was on the air on channel 22 by 2000 with programming aimed at a family audience. It relaunched on February 11, 2002, as a Spanish-language TV station affiliated with the Hispanic Television Network and owned by Jabar Communications. By 2005, it was airing Azteca América.

== Subchannels ==
The station's signal is multiplexed:

Subchannels of WAZS-LD
Subchannel	Res.	Short name	Programming
29.1	1080i	WAZS-1	Quiero TV
29.2	480i	WAZS-2	Quiero Música (music videos)
