= WQNT =

- Charleston, South Carolina; United States
- Broadcast area: Charleston metropolitan area
- Frequency: 1450 kHz

Ownership
- Owner: Kirkman Broadcasting, Inc.
- Sister stations: WJNI, WQSC, WTMZ, WTMZ-FM

History
- First air date: 1948
- Last air date: December 10, 2025
- Former call signs: WUSN (1948–1955); WQSN (1955–1987); WWHT (1987–1989); WXCH (1989–1990); WUJM (1990–1996)

Technical information
- Facility ID: 31946
- Class: C
- Power: 848 watts
- Transmitter coordinates: 32°49′7.00″N 79°57′43.00″W
- Translator: 102.1 W271CP (Charleston)

WQNT (1450 AM) was a commercial radio station licensed to Charleston, South Carolina, United States, that operated from 1948 to 2025. Last owned by Kirkman Broadcasting, it aired a classic hits format at its closure, branded as "102.1 The City". The studios were located on Markfield Drive in the West Ashley neighborhood of Charleston.

WQNT's transmitter was sited off Braswell Street, near the Ashley River, in Charleston. Programming was also heard on low-power FM translator W271CP on 102.1 MHz in Charleston.

== History ==
The station's call sign was originally WUSN. It signed on the air in 1948. In 1955, its callsign changed to WQSN. It began as a network affiliate of the Mutual Broadcasting System. In the 1970s, the station played country music and carried news from CBS Radio.

For several years, WQNT was an all-news radio station, airing CNN Headline News. In the early 2000s, it was a sports radio outlet, carrying Fox Sports Radio, Clemson Tiger Insider Dan Scott, Primetime with the Packman, "The Jim Rome Show" and the Citadel Sports Network. In 2011, WQNT began airing syndicated sports programs from Steve Czaban and Dan Patrick, with other sports shows from ESPN Radio.

On December 6, 2016, WQNT changed its format from sports to classic hits and oldies, branded as "92.1/102.1 The City." AM 1450 was simulcast on two FM translators: W221CI/92.1—Summerville and 102.1/W254BK—Charleston.

On August 17, 2020, the 92.1 translator split from its simulcast with WQNT. It carries a classic hip hop format from WJNI-HD2 on 106.3 FM in Ladson.

The Federal Communications Commission cancelled the station’s license on December 10, 2025.
