= Rob Fowler (meteorologist) =

American meteorologist

Rob Fowler is a meteorologist in the South Carolina Lowcountry, and chief meteorologist for WCBD-TV. Fowler is married with three children: Trey, Kylie, and Tate.

== Meteorologist with WCBD ==
Rob Fowler became a meteorologist for WCBD in Charleston, SC in 1987. Before this, he worked for WBAY in Green Bay, Wisconsin. He was hired as Chief meteorologist at WCBD. Fowler has won many national awards for his work.

== Hurricane Hugo ==
Fowler stayed in Charleston, before, during, and after Hurricane Hugo in 1989. He also gave a special report on the hours leading up to the hurricane and on the destruction left in its wake.

== Shaving the mustache ==
In May 2007, Fowler announced that he was going to shave off his famous mustache for the American Cancer Society, after recovering from cancer himself. The mustache is gone, and Fowler has not grown it back since, other than when he agreed to grow the mustache for the 30 days of "Movember", a Men's Health Awareness Activity in November, 2013.

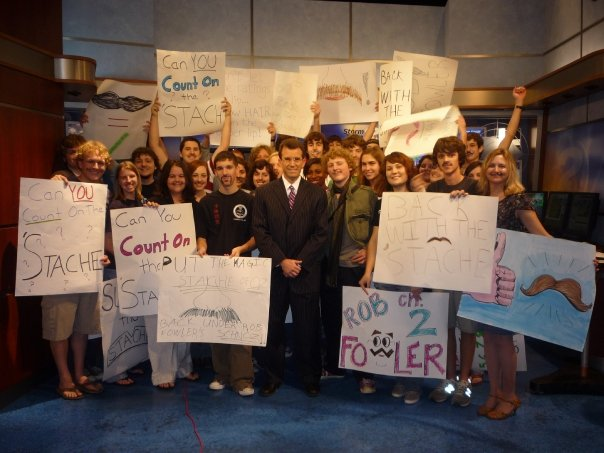
Rob Fowler meets with the protesters

On December 19, 2008, a group of students from across South Carolina including Wando High School, Clemson University, College of Charleston, and The Citadel Military College formed a protest in front of the News 2 studio, led by Wando High School senior, Joey Nelson, to try to convince Rob Fowler to grow the mustache back.

In October 2009, five Charleston residents, Matt Stanley, Thomas McElwee, Chris Richter, John Tankersley, and Kristin Abbott, started a band named Fowler's Mustache. Regarding the band's name choice, McElwee said "Rob Fowler decided to shave his mustache off, which we all agree was a terrible idea. We joke that we're bringing back the best thing that the Lowcountry has been missing out on."

== Toys for Tots ==
Fowler has been working with the Marines to help give toys to underprivileged children. He works with the Boy Scouts, Papa Johns, and Chick-Fil-A to collect toys. He usually lets his children come with him to deliver toys.
