= WMXZ =

Radio station in Isle of Palms, South Carolina

- Isle of Palms, South Carolina; United States
- Broadcast area: South Carolina Lowcountry; Charleston metropolitan area
- Frequency: 95.9 MHz
- Branding: Mix 95.9

Programming
- Format: Top 40
- Affiliations: Compass Media Networks; Premiere Networks

Ownership
- Owner: Saga Communications; (Saga South Communications, LLC)
- Sister stations: WAVF; WCKN; WSPO; WXST

History
- First air date: May 1967 (as WWBD-FM at 95.7)
- Former call signs: WWBD-FM (1978–1985); WWLT (1985–1993); WWBD (1993–January 2009); WIOP (January–February 2009); WSPO (February–June 2009); WIOP (June 2009–2012)
- Former frequencies: 95.7 MHz (1967–2009)
- Call sign meaning: W MiX Z

Technical information
- Licensing authority: FCC
- Facility ID: 6634
- Class: C2
- ERP: 50,000 watts
- HAAT: 107.4 meters (352 ft)
- Transmitter coordinates: 32°49′27.00″N 80°00′10.00″W

Links
- Public license information: Public file; LMS
- Webcast: Listen Live
- Website: mix959.com

WMXZ (95.9 FM, "Mix 95.9") is a radio station licensed to Isle of Palms, South Carolina, United States, serving the South Carolina Lowcountry and Charleston metropolitan area. The station is owned by Saga Communications, and operates as part of its Charleston Radio Group. WMXZ airs a top 40 format. The station's studios are located in Charleston (east of the Cooper River) and the transmitter tower is in West Ashley, South Carolina.

In 2012, WMXZ commenced HD Radio service with 99.3 The Box on the HD2 channel, featuring Urban and R&B music.

== History ==
Vic Whetstone owned WWBD in Bamberg, South Carolina for 25 years. Miller Communications, a company based in Sumter, South Carolina, acquired it in 2003. It then became a classic rock station as "Bad Dog 95.7". In September 2005, WWBD upgraded from 6,000 to 25,000 watts with a new 500-foot tower in Canaan. In 2006, WWBD changed to country music as "Outlaw 95.7" but listeners overwhelmingly demanded that Bad Dog return, so it did after four months. In June 2007, Miller applied for a change in the city of license to Isle of Palms near Charleston but said Bad Dog would stay in Orangeburg.

Apex Broadcasting, owner of WXTC, WIHB, and WXST, purchased WWBD from Miller in a deal announced in July 2008. The power had been increased to 50,000 watts.

WSPO was part of a large frequency swap in Charleston and Myrtle Beach. The 96.1 frequency in Charleston moved to the Myrtle Beach market and became the new home of WKZQ-FM. WKZQ's former 101.7 frequency moved to Hanahan and is owned by Apex Broadcasting. This allowed the Charleston metro area to get a new station, as WWBD moved to Isle of Palms with Apex as its new owner. The Bad Dog format began simulcasting with Miller's 105.1 WGFG on January 14, 2009. The simulcast stopped and 95.7 FM is now silent, with WQKI-FM expected to take over the frequency.

The station was assigned the WSPO call letters by the Federal Communications Commission on February 25, 2009. They were switched to WIOP in June 2009 when the WSPO calls went to the sister station at 1390 AM with its new sports talk format.

On June 18, 2009, 95.9 FM launched in the Charleston area with a classic hits format, last heard on WXLY before it dropped the format in favor of adult contemporary in late 2007. The station re-imaged as "95-9 IOP" in August 2010, and switched to country music on September 15, 2010 as "Kickin 95.9, Real Country Variety".

On May 31, 2011 WIHB (now WCKN) began simulcasting WIOP. On June 13, 2011 WIOP stopped simulcasting and began stunting with construction sounds. On June 15, 2011 WIOP ended stunting and changed their format to soft adult contemporary, branded as "Lite 95.9". The station featured a blend of light AC hits, softer rock oldies, and some adult standards from the 1960s through the early 2000s but was entirely gold-based, playing no current product. Artists heard on Lite 95.9 included Lionel Richie, Elton John, Billy Joel, Carly Simon, Mariah Carey, Olivia Newton-John, Josh Groban, Eric Clapton, Celine Dion, Kenny Rogers, and Barbra Streisand.

On March 5, 2012, WIOP became the "New Mix 95.9", with hot adult contemporary, and changed their call letters to WMXZ on March 14, 2012.

In 2014, "Mix 95.9" became "Mix 96" and while still CHR the station is trying to compete with Charleston's Cumulus-owned WSSX "95-SX.", the only other CHR in the market. That all changed in April 2017, when Mediabase moved the station to the Top 40/CHR panel.

In July 2017, WMXZ reverted to the "Mix 95.9" branding.

On September 6, 2017, the sale of the station to Saga Communications was complete.

On December 5, 2024, Mike Edwards from the segment "Two Girls and a Guy" died.

== HD2 format change ==
On March 27, 2013, WMXZ's HD2 subchannel changed their format from Regional Mexican to mainstream urban, branded as "99.3 The Box" (using the frequency of FM translator W257BQ in its branding).
