= WTMZ (AM) =

- Dorchester Terrace--Brentwood, South Carolina; United States
- Broadcast area: Charleston metropolitan area
- Frequency: 910 kHz
- Branding: The Zone 94.7

Programming
- Format: Sports
- Affiliations: Fox Sports Radio; ESPN Radio; Infinity Sports Network

Ownership
- Owner: Kirkman Broadcasting, Inc.
- Sister stations: WJNI, WQSC, WQNT, WTMZ-FM

History
- First air date: 1982
- Former call signs: WKCN (1982–1990); WVVO (1990–1993)
- Call sign meaning: Former "team" branding

Technical information
- Licensing authority: FCC
- Facility ID: 72370
- Class: D
- Power: 500 watts (day); 85 watts (night)
- Transmitter coordinates: 32°52′21″N 79°58′35.2″W
- Translator: 94.7 W234CV (Charleston)

Links
- Public license information: Public file; LMS
- Webcast: Listen live
- Website: charlestonsportsradio.com

WTMZ (910 AM, "The Zone") is a commercial radio station broadcasting a sports format. It is licensed to Dorchester Terrace and Brentwood, two communities in North Charleston, South Carolina. It serves the Charleston metropolitan area. The station is owned by Kirkman Broadcasting, Inc. with offices and studios on Markfield Drive in Charleston.

In addition to being heard on 910 AM, WTMZ is also simulcast on low-power FM translator 94.7 W234CV in Charleston.

Most of WTMZ's programming comes from Fox Sports Radio. On weekdays, it also carries The Jim Rome Show from the Infinity Sports Network, The Dan Patrick Show from Fox Sports Radio and The Paul Finebaum Show from ESPN's Charlotte studios.

== History ==
The station signed on the air in 1982. Its original call sign was WKCN. It also used the call letters WVVO before becoming WTMZ in 1993.

The sports talk format was simulcast on what was then called WWIK in 2014. On August 17, 2020, WTMZ ended its simulcast of 98.9 WTMZ-FM "ESPN Charleston" and began airing sports programming previously heard on WQSC. WQSC switched to a classic hits format.

While 98.9 WTMZ-FM carries mostly ESPN Radio programs, WTMZ 910 and 94.7 air mostly Fox Sports Radio shows.
