= WZJY =

- Mount Pleasant, South Carolina; United States
- Broadcast area: Charleston, South Carolina
- Frequency: 1480 kHz
- Branding: Kaliente 95.5

Programming
- Format: Spanish tropical

Ownership
- Owner: Norberto Sanchez; (Norsan Communications and Management, Inc.)
- Sister stations: WAZS

Technical information
- Licensing authority: FCC
- Facility ID: 47150
- Class: D
- Power: 880 watts day 44 watts night
- Transmitter coordinates: 32°49′34″N 79°49′53″W
- Translator: 95.5 W238CO (Charleston)

Links
- Public license information: Public file; LMS
- Website: WZJY Online

WZJY (1480 AM) is a radio station broadcasting a Spanish tropical format. Licensed to Mount Pleasant, South Carolina, United States, it serves the Charleston, South Carolina area. The station is currently owned by Norberto Sanchez, through licensee Norsan Communications and Management, Inc.

== History ==
At one time WZJY was "Integrity 1480" with a Christian radio format.

Before its most recent change, WZJY was "WZJY TALK", 24 hours per day giving information to the African American community. The line up included The David Mack Show, Jesse Lee Peterson, 2 Live Stews, Alfrea Deas Mikells, The Bev Smith Show and David Stein. The weekend line up included The House Divided, The Group Room, Saturday Magazine with Sam Dennis, Inspirations Across America and more. On Weekends and late nights on weekdays WZJY played classic R&B.
