= WCOO =

- Kiawah Island, South Carolina; United States
- Broadcast area: Charleston, South Carolina
- Frequency: 105.5 MHz
- Branding: 105.5 The Bridge

Programming
- Format: Adult album alternative

Ownership
- Owner: Lynn M. Martin; (L.M. Communications II of South Carolina, Inc.)
- Sister stations: WYBB

History
- First air date: March 1970
- Former call signs: WWMC (1970–1974); WTWF (1974–1982); WLVW (1982–1985); WMXQ (1985–1987); WJYQ (1987–1995); WNST (1995–1998)
- Former frequencies: 105.5 MHz (1970–1996); 105.3 MHz (1996–2001)
- Call sign meaning: "Cool" (previous format)

Technical information
- Licensing authority: FCC
- Facility ID: 50729
- Class: C2
- ERP: 28,000 watts
- HAAT: 179.4 meters (589 ft)
- Transmitter coordinates: 32°47′56.00″N 79°53′50.00″W

Links
- Public license information: Public file; LMS
- Webcast: Listen live
- Website: 1055thebridge.com

WCOO (105.5 FM) is a commercial radio station licensed to Kiawah Island, South Carolina, United States, and serving the Charleston metropolitan area. Owned by Lynn Martin, the station broadcasts an adult album alternative format, with studios on Windermere Boulevard in Charleston, west of the Ashley River.

WCOO's transmitter is sited on McGrath Darby Boulevard in Mount Pleasant.

== History ==
The station signed on the air in March 1970. Originally, the call sign was WWMC, licensed to Moncks Corner and broadcasting at 3,000 watts.

In the mid-1990s, WNST "New Star" played hot adult contemporary music under the name "Star 105".

In December 1998, WCOO switched to rhythmic oldies, becoming "Cool 105.3". Soon, WCOO made big ratings gains at the expense of long-time AC station 102.5 WXLY. WXLY recovered but WCOO continued to improve.

Previous logo

In January 2004, WCOO changed to its current format.
