= WAZS (AM) =

Summerville, South Carolina; United States
- Broadcast area: Charleston, South Carolina
- Frequency: 980 kHz
- Branding: La Raza 103.9

Programming
- Format: Regional Mexican
- Affiliations: Charlotte FC

Ownership
- Owner: Norberto Sanchez; (Norsan Communications and Management, Inc.)
- Sister stations: WZJY

History
- First air date: June 7, 1962; 62 years ago

Technical information
- Licensing authority: FCC
- Facility ID: 54839
- Class: D
- Power: 1,000 watts day 131 watts night
- Transmitter coordinates: 33°1′57″N 80°12′0″W
- Translator(s): 103.9 W280EX (North Charleston)

Links
- Public license information: Public file; LMS
- Webcast: Listen live
- Website: larazalaraza.com/charleston/

WAZS (980 kHz) is an AM radio station licensed to Summerville, South Carolina, United States, serving the Charleston area. The station is currently owned by Norberto Sánchez through licensee Norsan Communications and Management, Inc., and broadcasts a Regional Mexican format known as La Raza 103.9 named for the frequency of its translator station W280EX.

== History ==
On March 31, 1960, Radio Summerville, Inc., applied to the Federal Communications Commission (FCC) for a construction permit to build a new radio station in Summerville, which would operate as a 500-watt, daytime-only outlet. The FCC approved the application on October 11, 1961, and WAZS began broadcasting as Summerville and Dorchester County's first radio station on June 7, 1962, featuring what its owner called "a middle-of-the road format of good music". The original controlling owner of Radio Summerville, N. H. Hamilton, transferred control to Sam E. Felkel in 1965; under Felkel, the station was approved to increase its daytime power to 1,000 watts. The format remained country music with local sports coverage.

In 2000, Radio Summerville sold WAZS to Thomas Daniels, Inc. (Jabar Communications). At this time, the station ran religious programming and was known as "Spirit 980". This changed in June 2001 with the launch of WAZS as a Spanish-language station, the first in the Charleston area.

WAZS returned to English-language programming for a time beginning in 2005, when it switched to jazz music as a result of Jabar's purchase the year before of FM station WWBZ, which became WAZS-FM and began simulcasting. With listener response being scant to the jazz format, an afternoon beach music program was added the next year. Before eventually reverting to full-time Spanish-language programming, an oldies format was instituted in 2007 as "The Rocket 980".

In 2017, Jabar Communications, whose Charleston operations had grown to two Spanish-language radio stations and two low-power TV stations, sold its business in that city to Norsan Media—owned by Norberto Sánchez of Charlotte, North Carolina—for $850,000.
