= WSSX-FM =

- Charleston, South Carolina; United States
- Broadcast area: Charleston metropolitan area
- Frequency: 95.1 MHz
- Branding: 95SX

Programming
- Format: Contemporary hit radio
- Affiliations: United Stations Radio Networks; Westwood One

Ownership
- Owner: Cumulus Media; (Radio License Holding CBC, LLC)
- Sister stations: WWWZ; WIWF; WTMA; WMGL

History
- First air date: June 2, 1947
- Former call signs: WTMA-FM (1945–1972); WPXI (1972–1981)
- Call sign meaning: "Sconnix" (previous owner)

Technical information
- Licensing authority: FCC
- Facility ID: 72378
- Class: C0
- ERP: 100,000 watts
- HAAT: 305 meters (1,001 ft)
- Transmitter coordinates: 32°47′44.00″N 79°50′27.00″W

Links
- Public license information: Public file; LMS
- Webcast: Listen live; Listen live (via Audacy); Listen live (via iHeartRadio)
- Website: www.95sx.com

WSSX-FM (95.1 MHz, "95SX") is a top 40 (CHR) radio station located in Charleston, South Carolina. The station is licensed by the Federal Communications Commission (FCC) to broadcast with an effective radiated power (ERP) of 100 kW. The station is owned by Cumulus Media. Its studios are located in North Charleston and the transmitter tower is located in Mount Pleasant.

== History ==
95.1 originally signed on June 2, 1947, as WTMA-FM, the sister to WTMA AM 1250. By the late 1950s, WTMA-FM was simulcasting much of the AM's programming full-time, which was top 40 by that point.

When the FCC started to limit simulcasts of AM and FM stations in the late 1960s, WTMA-FM became WPXI in 1972, with an automated "beautiful music" format. In 1975, WPXI changed to urban contemporary as "Super 95 Soul". Although it was still automated, it was noted as being one of the few commercial urban FMs in South Carolina at the time.

In 1981, WPXI dropped the urban format as the station became WSSX, with a top 40/AOR hybrid known as contemporary hit radio. Their slogan was "We Are The Rock 'N' Roll Station. The All New 95 FM WSSX", the station went to #1 in the ratings within a year. By 1983, the station had transitioned to a fully-fledged mainstream CHR radio station under their nickname "Hitradio The All New 95SX FM", again going #1 on several occasions throughout the remainder of the 1980s.

By December 1992, WSSX's ratings had begun to decline as the station shifted away from CHR to hot adult contemporary as "The New 95 Mix", then later changed to Mix 95.1. This lasted until September 1995, when the station returned to their CHR roots and their iconic nickname "95SX". Iconic DJ Danger Dan (Elm) was an integral part of 95SX in the mid 1990s.

95SX's logo prior to 2010.

In October 2007, following sister WSUY's flip from adult contemporary music to country music, the station invited listeners from the station to tune to 95.1FM saying "Welcome 96.9 Listeners".

As of January 2010, WSSX, whose direction favored adults and at times took a conservative approach by playing hot AC or pop/rock artists, has begun to shift towards a rhythmic-leaning direction, as it now favors rhythmic pop acts. This move might be due to a changing taste in its listeners' musical choices and its decision to attract a younger demo. The station's main competitor, Apex Broadcasting's WIHB, switched to a hip hop format in March 2010. This left WSSX as the only CHR station in the market at the time. In 2025, WMXZ was reported to have become a Top 40 station, making it a 95SX competitor.

Their official station mascot is the 95SX's Party Parrot.

In mid-late October, The Bert Show which previously broadcast on WSSX 6-10 AM ended, making way for the new morning show, The TJ Show
