= WTMA =

- Charleston, South Carolina; United States
- Broadcast area: Charleston metropolitan area
- Frequency: 1250 kHz
- Branding: News-Talk 1250 AM WTMA

Programming
- Format: News/talk
- Affiliations: ABC News Radio; Westwood One

Ownership
- Owner: Cumulus Media; (Radio License Holding CBC, LLC)
- Sister stations: WIWF; WSSX-FM; WWWZ

History
- First air date: June 16, 1939
- Former frequencies: 1210 kHz (1939–1941)
- Call sign meaning: "Where Talk Means Action" (backronym)

Technical information
- Licensing authority: FCC
- Facility ID: 72376
- Class: B
- Power: 5,000 watts day; 1,000 watts night
- Transmitter coordinates: 32°49′27″N 80°00′10″W
- Repeater: 96.9 WIWF-HD2 (Charleston)

Links
- Public license information: Public file; LMS
- Webcast: Listen live
- Website: www.wtma.com

WTMA (1250 AM), "News Talk 1250 WTMA", is a commercial radio station licensed to Charleston, South Carolina. It has a news/talk format and is owned by Cumulus Media. WTMA's studios and offices are on Faber Place Drive in North Charleston.

By day, WTMA broadcasts with 5,000 non-directional watts. At night, to protect other stations on 1250 AM, WTMA reduces power to 1,000 watts and switches to a directional antenna with a two-tower array. The transmitter is off Eton Road in Charleston. The station streams its programming through its website, WTMA.com, as well as through iHeartRadio and free smartphone apps.

== Programming ==
In weekday morning drive time, WTMA airs a local news and information show hosted by John Quincy and Sheree Bernardi. The rest of the weekday schedule is made up of nationally syndicated conservative talk shows, mostly from Cumulus subsidiary Westwood One. They include Chris Plante, Ben Shapiro, Michael Knowles, Mark Levin, Dan Bongino, Rich Valdés, Red Eye Radio and America in the Morning.

Weekends feature shows on money, health, real estate, and gardening, along with repeats of weekday shows. Each hour begins with world and national news from ABC News Radio.

== History ==
WTMA signed on the air on June 16, 1939. It was an affiliate of the NBC Red Network and is the Charleston area's second-oldest AM radio station. Of those two, WTMA is the only one to maintain its current call letters. (Charleston's oldest station is WSPO. Originally WCSC, it went on the air in 1930.)

In 1945, WTMA added an FM sister station which today is WSSX-FM. From its beginnings through the early 1960s, WTMA carried NBC's dramas, comedies, news, sports, soap operas, game shows, and big band broadcasts during the "Golden Age of Radio".

From the early 1960s through 1981, WTMA broadcast a Top 40 format and was an ABC Contemporary Network affiliate. But like many other AM Radio Top 40 stations, it switched to an adult contemporary format in the early 80s until 1986, when young people began tuning in FM stations for the latest hits. Over time, WTMA tried a couple different formats including R&B-flavored oldies and classic country music. Then on June 1, 1989, it switched to its current talk format, under the ownership of Citadel Broadcasting. Citadel merged with Cumulus Media on September 16, 2011.

In May 1999, WTMA lost popular syndicated shows by Rush Limbaugh and Dr. Laura to new talk radio competitor WSCC. Still, the station jumped from 13th to 7th in the morning and from 16th to 12th with 25-54 listeners. Program director Jason Wilmot said WTMA was still the number one station for news.
