= WCKN =

Radio station in Moncks Corner, South Carolina

- Moncks Corner, South Carolina (Note: Originally licensed to Manning, South Carolina; moved to Moncks Corner in 2003.); United States
- Broadcast area: Charleston metropolitan area
- Frequency: 92.5 MHz
- Branding: 92.5 Kickin' Country

Programming
- Format: Country
- Affiliations: Compass Media Networks

Ownership
- Owner: Saga Communications; (Saga South Communications, LLC)
- Sister stations: WAVF; WMXZ; WSPO; WXST

History
- First air date: 1973 (as WTWE)
- Former call signs: WTWE (1973–1986); WHLZ (1986–2003); WCSQ (2003–2005); WIHB (2005–2011)
- Call sign meaning: W KiCKiN

Technical information
- Licensing authority: FCC
- Facility ID: 11651
- Class: C1
- ERP: 100,000 watts
- HAAT: 237 meters (778 ft)
- Transmitter coordinates: 32°49′4.00″N 79°50′8.00″W

Links
- Public license information: Public file; LMS
- Webcast: Listen Live
- Website: 925kickincountry.com

WCKN (92.5 FM) is a radio station broadcasting a country music format. Licensed to Moncks Corner, South Carolina, United States, the station serves the Charleston metropolitan area. The station is owned by Saga Communications as part of its Charleston Radio Group. The station's studios are located in Charleston (east of the Cooper River) and the transmitter tower is in Mount Pleasant.

== History ==
This station started out at 92.1 with 3,000 watts and the letters WTWE and was licensed to Manning, South Carolina.

In 1986, WTWE moved to 92.5 and became WHLZ "Wheels 92.5", a country radio station, broadcasting at 100,000 watts while remaining licensed to Manning. It was one of the biggest country stations in the Carolinas, with a signal from Lumberton, NC to Charleston, SC.

92.5 moved closer to Charleston in 2003 and became hot adult contemporary WCSQ "Coast 92.5," while the country format and WHLZ call letters moved to a smaller station licensed to Marion, South Carolina, near Florence. WCSQ changed its format to top 40 with the call letters WIHB in 2005 with the moniker B92. It mainly competed with the more established top 40 in the market, WSSX, although B92 had more of a rhythmic lean.

In 2009, WIHB applied for a taller tower with power reduced to 77,000 watts.

On Friday, March 19, 2010, "B-92" flipped formats from top 40 to Mainstream Urban as "92-5 The Box." The station called itself "Charleston's New #1 for Hip-Hop" and featured the Rickey Smiley Morning Show from 6:00am to 10:00am.

On May 31, 2011, WIHB changed their format to country, simulcasting WIOP 95.9 FM, which began its own format two weeks later. WIHB became WCKN "Kickin' 92.5", with Charlie James of WWNU as the morning host.

In August 2013, WCKN began calling itself "New Country, Kickin’ 92.5." In June 2017, WCKN rebranded as "92.5 Kickin' Country" with the slogan "Real Country Variety from the 1990s to Now."

On September 6, 2017, the sale of the station to Saga Communications was complete.

== Previous logos ==
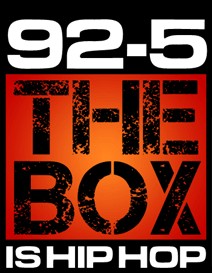
