= WIWF =

- Charleston, South Carolina; United States
- Broadcast area: Lowcountry
- Frequency: 96.9 MHz (HD Radio)
- Branding: Classic Hits 96.9

Programming
- Format: Classic hits
- Subchannels: HD2: WTMA simulcast
- Affiliations: Premiere Networks; Westwood One

Ownership
- Owner: Cumulus Media; (Radio License Holding CBC, LLC)
- Sister stations: WSSX-FM, WWWZ, WTMA, WMGL

History
- First air date: April 1, 1948 (as WCSC-FM)
- Former call signs: WCSC-FM (1948–1973); WXTC (1973–1987); WXTC-FM (1987–1996); WJZK (1996–1997); WSUY (1997–2007)
- Call sign meaning: W I WolF (previous branding)

Technical information
- Licensing authority: FCC
- Facility ID: 60039
- Class: C
- ERP: 99,000 watts 100,000 with beam tilt
- HAAT: 539 meters (1,768 ft)
- Transmitter coordinates: 32°55′28.00″N 79°41′58.00″W

Links
- Public license information: Public file; LMS
- Webcast: Listen live
- Website: classichits969.com

WIWF (96.9 FM) is a commercial radio station in Charleston, South Carolina, broadcasting to the Lowcountry area South Carolina. It is owned by Cumulus Media and airs a classic hits radio format branded as "Classic Hits 96.9." The syndicated John Boy & Billy show, from Premiere Networks, is heard weekday mornings on WIWF, with local DJs heard the rest of the day.

WIWF's studios are located in North Charleston. WIWF's transmitter tower is off Seewee Road in Awendaw. Its effective radiated power is 99,000 watts (100,000 with beam tilt). The antenna height above average terrain (HAAT) is 539 meters (1,758 feet).

== History ==
The station signed on the air April 1, 1948, as WCSC-FM, the FM sister to WCSC (now WSPO). WCSC-FM was Charleston's second FM station, going on the air a year after WTMA-FM (now WSSX-FM). WCSC-AM-FM were CBS Radio Network affiliates, simulcasting CBS's schedule of dramas, comedies, news and sports. As network programming moved from radio to television, WCSC-AM-FM switched to a full service middle of the road format of popular adult music, news and sports.

In the late 1960s, the Federal Communications Commission began requiring FM stations to end their simulcasts; WCSC-FM would switch to a beautiful music format. To give it a separate identity from WCSC, the FM station became WXTC-FM in 1973, calling itself "Ecstasy." In 1985, the station flipped to adult contemporary, and in the second half of the 1990s, WXTC-FM downgraded its format to soft adult contemporary, which then later flipped to smooth jazz (as WJZK) in 1996. In 1997, the format would switch again, this time to 1970s hits, and adopt the WSUY call letters. The format would shift towards its former adult contemporary format in the 2000s.

On October 11, 2007, after a day of redirecting listeners to sister station WSSX, WSUY dropped the AC format and flipped to country music as "96.9 The Wolf." This came shortly before Citadel Broadcasting moved its Charleston country outlet, WNKT, into the Columbia, South Carolina radio market. With the change to The Wolf, Citadel Broadcasting had a country music station in the Charleston market, even after WNKT relocated, to compete with rival country music station WEZL, owned by Clear Channel Communications (now iHeartMedia). However, the changes left Charleston without any adult contemporary-formatted stations. Shortly after the flip to country, the WSUY call letters were changed to WIWF. (WXLY would soon become an adult contemporary station.)

Citadel merged with Cumulus Media on September 16, 2011. On February 3, 2014, WIWF, along with nine other Cumulus owned country music stations, made the switch to the "Nash FM" branding. Jessica Chandler and Jay Shadix moved to afternoons as their morning show was replaced by America's Morning Show.

Previous logo

On November 19, 2018, WIWF dropped the "Nash FM" branding and the country music format for the return of the "96.9 The Wolf" branding, and began playing Christmas music for the holiday season. On December 26, 2018, WIWF launched a classic hits format, retaining the "Wolf" branding. WIWF also brought in the syndicated John Boy & Billy radio show for mornings, based at WRFX in Charlotte, North Carolina.

The playlist primarily consists of 1970s and 1980s rock, pop/rock, and soft rock hits from artists such as Foreigner, Michael Jackson, Steve Miller Band, Prince, Eagles, and Tom Petty.

On September 8, 2025, WIWF dropped "The Wolf" branding and rebranded as "Classic Hits 96.9".
