= WTMZ-FM =

- McClellanville, South Carolina; United States
- Broadcast area: Charleston, South Carolina
- Frequency: 98.9 MHz
- Branding: ESPN 98.9 FM

Programming
- Format: Sports
- Affiliations: ESPN Radio

Ownership
- Owner: Guilford Kirkman, Jr.; (Kirkman Broadcasting, Inc.)

History
- First air date: June 14, 1991; 35 years ago (as WZJQ)
- Former call signs: WZJQ (1991–1994); WWSS (1994); WWBZ (1994–2004); WAZS-FM (2004–2009); WWIK (2009–2020)

Technical information
- Licensing authority: FCC
- Facility ID: 24201
- Class: C2
- ERP: 50,000 watts
- HAAT: 150 meters
- Transmitter coordinates: 33°11′15.00″N 79°33′31.00″W

Links
- Public license information: Public file; LMS
- Webcast: Listen live
- Website: charlestonsportsradio.com

WTMZ-FM (98.9 FM), known as "ESPN 98.9 FM – Charleston Sports Radio", is a radio station broadcasting a syndicated sports format. Licensed to McClellanville, South Carolina, and serving the Charleston and Myrtle Beach areas, the station is currently owned by Guilford Kirkman, Jr., through licensee Kirkman Broadcasting, Inc. The station's studios are located in the West Ashley portion of Charleston and the transmitter site is in Awendaw.

== History ==
98.9 was originally WZJQ, and signed on June 14, 1991 and later as WWSS. In November 1994, the station changed to WWBZ and aired a syndicated beach music format as "The Breeze" while part of an LMA with WHBZ.

On September 15, 2000, Jabar Communications switched WWBZ to Hot 98.9, "Charleston's home for hip-hop and R&B." Vice-president of programming George Cook, known as George Hamilton, said the target audience would be 18–34 females, compared to 25–54 for his former station WWWZ "Z-93". At night, the Hot 98.9 leaned younger. Cook also did afternoons as Big G.O., and Doug Banks aired in the mornings.

WWBZ later switched to the rhythmic CHR format. In December 2004, the station became WAZS-FM, and switched to a Regional Mexican format.

In August 2009, the station switched to WWIK ("98.9 Chick FM"), with an adult contemporary format targeted at women. The station was anchored by its morning program, "Moms In The Morning." The Regional Mexican format is still heard on WZJY and WAZS.

On April 18, 2011, WWIK changed its format to classic hits, branded as "Fun FM".

In March 2013, WWIK changed its format and identity to ESPN 98.9 FM – Charleston Sports Radio. The format was simulcast on WTMZ until August 17, 2020.

On February 27, 2020, the station changed its call sign to WTMZ-FM.
