= WSPO =

Radio station in Charleston, South Carolina

- Charleston, South Carolina; United States
- Broadcast area: Charleston metropolitan area
- Frequency: 1390 kHz
- Branding: Heaven FM

Programming
- Format: Urban gospel

Ownership
- Owner: Saga Communications; (Saga South Communications, LLC)
- Sister stations: WAVF; WCKN; WMXZ; WXST

History
- First air date: May 14, 1930
- Former call signs: WCSC (1930–1989); WZKG (1989–1990); WCSE (1990–1991); WXTC (1991–2009)
- Former frequencies: 1310 kHz (1930); 1360 kHz (1930–1941)
- Call sign meaning: Former sports format

Technical information
- Licensing authority: FCC
- Facility ID: 60038
- Class: B
- Power: 5,000 watts
- Transmitter coordinates: 32°49′28.00″N 80°0′10.00″W
- Translator: 100.1 W261DG (Charleston)
- Repeater: 99.7 WXST-HD3 (Hollywood)

Links
- Public license information: Public file; LMS
- Webcast: Listen live
- Website: www.heavenradiofm.com

WSPO (1390 kHz) is a commercial radio station in Charleston, South Carolina, United States. The station is owned by Saga Communications, and operates as part of its Charleston Radio Group. It airs an urban gospel radio format. WSPO's studios are east of the Cooper River in Charleston.

WSPO transmits 5,000 watts. At night, to protect other stations on 1390 AM from interference, it uses a directional antenna with a three-tower array. Its transmitter is located east of the Ashley River in Charleston, near Sam Rittenberg Boulevard (South Carolina Highway 7). Programming is also heard on 250-watt FM translator W261DG at 100.1 MHz.

== History ==
=== WCSC ===
The station first signed on the air on May 14, 1930. Its original call sign was WCSC, broadcasting on 1310 kilocycles. It was the first radio station in Charleston as well as the second oldest in the state of South Carolina. It was started by Fred Jordan and Lewis Burk.

The station's first studios were in the Francis Marion Hotel. WCSC increased its power from 1,000 watts to 5,000 watts on December 14, 1947. For many of its early years, it was owned by the Rivers Family.

=== FM and TV ===
In 1946, 96.9 WCSC-FM went on the air. Initially it simulcast WCSC AM. The two stations were affiliates of the CBS Radio Network, airing its dramas, comedies, news and sports during the "Golden Age of Radio." In 1953, WCSC-TV debuted. Because WCSC-AM-FM were CBS stations, Channel 5 also became a CBS-TV affiliate.

By the late 1960s, WCSC-FM began airing its own separate format. It became a beautiful music station as WXTC (with the call letters representing the word "ecstasy." Today it is classic hits WIWF. The Rivers family sold WCSC-TV to Crump Communications of Houston in 1987 while the radio stations were sold to Ralph Guild of New York City that same year.

=== Top 40, AC, and sports talk ===
WCSC was a longtime top 40 station during the 1960s and 70s. It played the contemporary hits for Charleston's young people during the height of Rock and Roll's popularity. But by the 1980s, most listening to contemporary music had shifted to the FM dial.

In 1983, WCSC flipped from top 40 to full service, adult contemporary music in connection with 95.1 WSSX's launch as an FM contemporary hit radio station. WCSC competed against WTMA 1250 AM through much of the 1980s. But in 1989, both of the stations dropped adult contemporary entirely, leaving WXTC-FM the only adult contemporary station in the Charleston area. WCSC flipped to an oldies format and became WZKG in 1989 and later WCSE in 1990. Surprisingly after a short stint, WCSE became WXTC (AM) and returned to a simulcast of its previous adult contemporary format in 1991. However, five years later in 1996, WXTC dropped the format and flipped to sports talk.

During the early 2000s, WXTC was known as "Heaven 1390" with an urban gospel format. At the end of 2008, it went to a classic soul music format, which it carried until June 2009.

The station adopted the WSPO call letters (previously at 95.9 WMXZ) in June 2009 and flipped back to its previous sports talk format with an FM signal on 99.3. On September 6, 2017, the sale of the station to Saga Communications was completed.

=== Past personalities ===
Former sports radio branding

Under the previous sports radio format, "Southern Sports Now" with Seth Harp and later hosted by Jonas Mount and Big Ben was the station's local program. WSPO also featured national host Tim Brando. During the 2010 football season, WSPO aired college games from Westwood One and Sports USA Radio Network, plus NFL games each Sunday and Monday Night Football. WSPO was also the home for the ACC Basketball and NCAA basketball tournaments.

On March 10, 2010, Don Imus replaced Tony D, whose last day was February 26. A few months later, Steve Czaban moved to WJKB in September 2010. On October 22, 2011, WSPO changed its format to regional Mexican, branded as "Ritmo Caliente 99.3" and simulcast with W257BQ, and in 2012, WSPO changed to a tourist information format on its AM signal at 1390. A year later in 2013, WSPO's 99.3 FM signal changed to urban contemporary and was known as "99.3 The Box".
