= WAVF =

Radio station in Hanahan, South Carolina

- Hanahan, South Carolina; United States
- Broadcast area: South Carolina Lowcountry; Charleston metropolitan area
- Frequency: 101.7 MHz
- Branding: 101.7 Chuck FM

Programming
- Format: Adult hits

Ownership
- Owner: Saga Communications; (Saga South Communications, LLC)
- Sister stations: WCKN; WMXZ; WSPO; WXST

History
- First air date: July 3, 1969 (as WTGR-FM)
- Former call signs: WTGR-FM (1969–1973); WKZQ (1973–1983); WKZQ-FM (1983–2008)

Technical information
- Licensing authority: FCC
- Facility ID: 24776
- Class: C1
- ERP: 100,000 watts
- HAAT: 238.4 meters (782 ft)
- Transmitter coordinates: 32°49′4.6″N 79°50′7.3″W

Links
- Public license information: Public file; LMS
- Webcast: Listen live
- Website: www.1017chuckfm.com

WAVF (101.7 MHz) is a commercial FM radio station licensed to Hanahan, South Carolina, United States, and serving the South Carolina Lowcountry and Charleston metropolitan area. It is owned by Saga Communications as part of its Charleston Radio Group, and airs an adult hits radio format branded as "Chuck FM". The studios and offices are on Clements Ferry Road in Charleston.

WAVF has an effective radiated power (ERP) of 100,000 watts, the maximum for non-grandfathered FM stations. The transmitter is off Venning Road in Mount Pleasant.

== History ==
=== WAVF ===
==== 96 Wave history ====
Managing Partner Paul W. Robinson of Emerald City Media Partners oversaw the construction of a new radio station in the Charleston market. WAVF came on the air on March 11, 1985, on 96.1 FM as "96 Wave". It used the sound effects of ocean waves, played continuously over a week. When the stunt was over, the station debuted with an album-oriented rock (AOR) format.

Over time, 96 Wave shifted its format to alternative rock.

==== Howard Stern ====
Atom Taler was the wake-up host at 96 Wave for nine years. For the last three of those years he was joined by Jim Voigt, known as "The Critic". As their once-popular morning show began to see a decline in ratings, it was replaced. On February 23, 1998, The Howard Stern Show debuted for the Charleston radio market, syndicated from New York City. Ratings fell still further, but program director Rob Cressman pointed out ratings increased from a year earlier. He also said the station would improve with a format that relied less on alternative rock and more on personality.

After a year and a half, Charleston radio listeners had grown to like the program. Stern had the market's no. 1 morning show. WAVF also brought back The Critic for afternoons. 96 Wave was sold to Apex Broadcasting late in 2001.

On February 22, 2002, 96 Wave dropped Stern. Some advertisers did not like the show, so they would buy time on 96 Wave but not on Stern's show, or they avoided WAVF altogether. Stern's show also cost the station a high subscription fee, so airing his show became too expensive. Dick Dale, syndicated from WMMS in Cleveland, replaced Stern. WMMS created the show to compete with Stern and began syndicating it to Clear Channel Communications stations. However, Dale, who knew The Critic, had left WMMS, so this show would be local. WAVF general manager Dean Pearce described Dale's show as "intelligent", while program director Greg Patrick described it as "fast-paced", pointing out that the show would include music. Dale described his show as radio's answer to cable TV's The Daily Show.

==== Chuck FM ====
On August 31, 2007, at 5 p.m., "96 Wave" became known as "96.1 Chuck FM". Leading up to the switch, the station stunted for over 20 minutes, playing the "Charles in Charge" theme song. The first song played on the new 96.1 FM was "Take This Job and Shove It" by Johnny Paycheck. The final song played on WAVF was "My Wave" by Soundgarden.

On September 6, 2017, the sale of the station to Saga Communications was complete.

=== 101.7 history ===
==== WTZR-FM and WKZQ ====
WTZR-FM signed on the air on July 3, 1969. It was the sister station to WTGR (1520 AM) in Myrtle Beach. 101.7 FM was originally established as an automated beautiful music station, operating out of an equipment room. By the late 1970s, WTZR-FM changed its call letters to WKZQ. It switched to a rock format.

By the late 1980s, it was playing mainstream rock, then active rock in the 1990s and finally alternative rock. With this alternative format, WKZQ was a popular radio station both in South Carolina and among alternative rock fans across the country. Rolling Stone magazine named it one of the "Top 5 Radio Stations" in America.

==== Switching stations ====
Because Myrtle Beach is a smaller radio market than Charleston, the decision was made to move WKZQ to a community near Charleston. That would allow it to charge more for the commercials it played and enjoy more revenue.

In September 2008, WKZQ abandoned its historic frequency of 101.7 MHz and migrated to 96.1 MHz in a frequency swap with WAVF. WKZQ-FM continues as an alternative rock station serving the Myrtle Beach market from its city of license in Forestbrook, South Carolina. WAVF remains an adult hits station, serving the Charleston market from its 101.7 MHz frequency.
