= Awendaw, South Carolina =

- Town
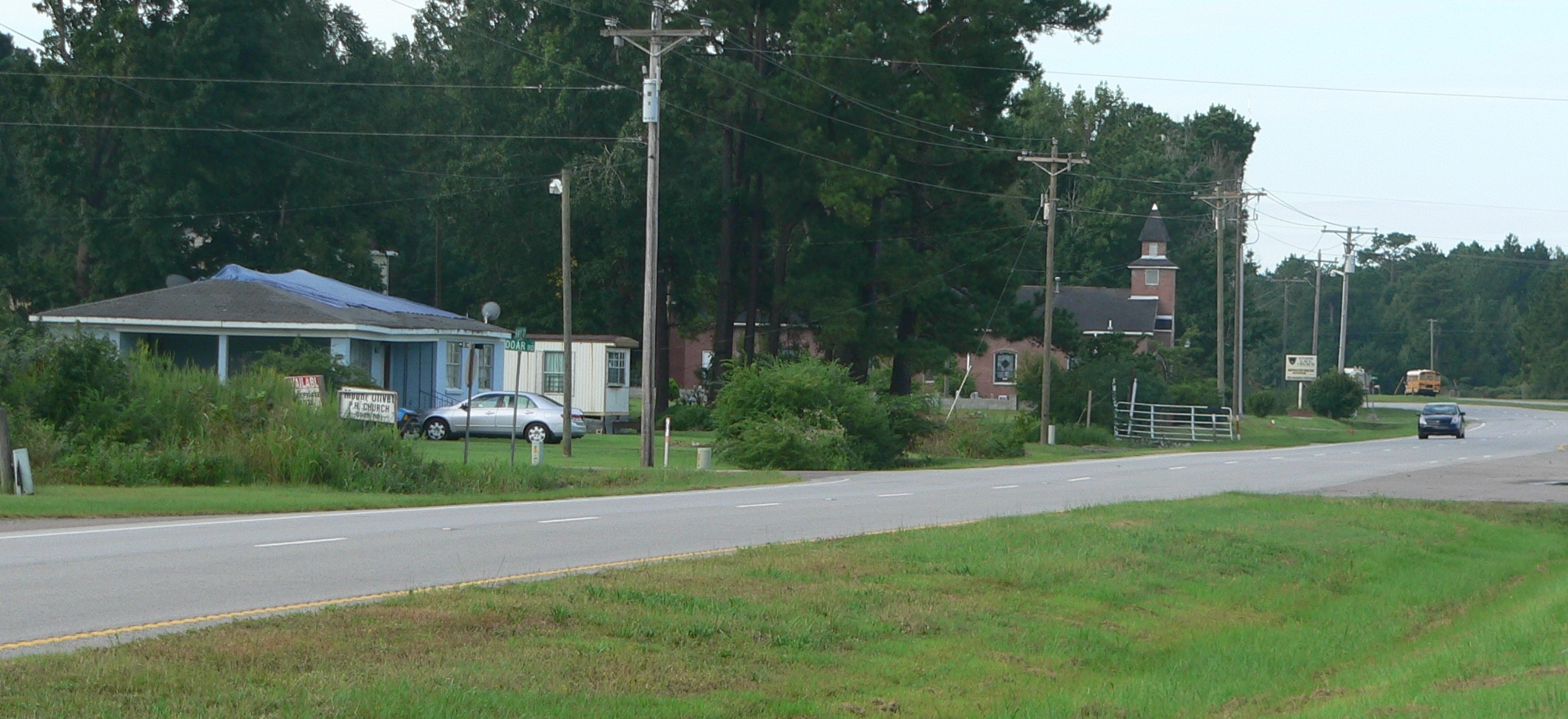
- Awendaw, with U.S. Highway 17 in foreground

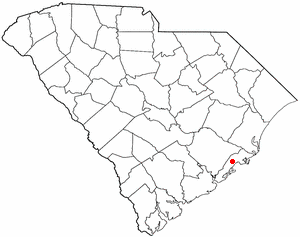
- Location of Awendaw in South Carolina
- Coordinates: 32°59′11″N 79°38′36″W
- Country: United States
- State: South Carolina
- County: Charleston
- Established: 1992

Area
  - Total: 17.59 sq mi (45.57 km^{2})
  - Land: 17.35 sq mi (44.93 km^{2})
  - Water: 0.25 sq mi (0.65 km^{2})
- Elevation: 20 ft (6.1 m)

Population (2020)
  - Total: 1,399
  - Density: 80.7/sq mi (31.14/km^{2})
- Time zone: UTC−5 (EST)
  - Summer (DST): UTC−4 (EDT)
- ZIP code: 29429
- Area codes: 843, 854
- FIPS code: 45-03385
- GNIS feature ID: 2405192
- Website: www.townofawendawsc.org

Awendaw (/ˈɔːwɪndɔː/ AW-win-daw) is a small fishing town in Charleston County, South Carolina, United States. As of the 2020 census, Awendaw had a population of 1,399. Awendaw is part of the Charleston, South Carolina metropolitan area.

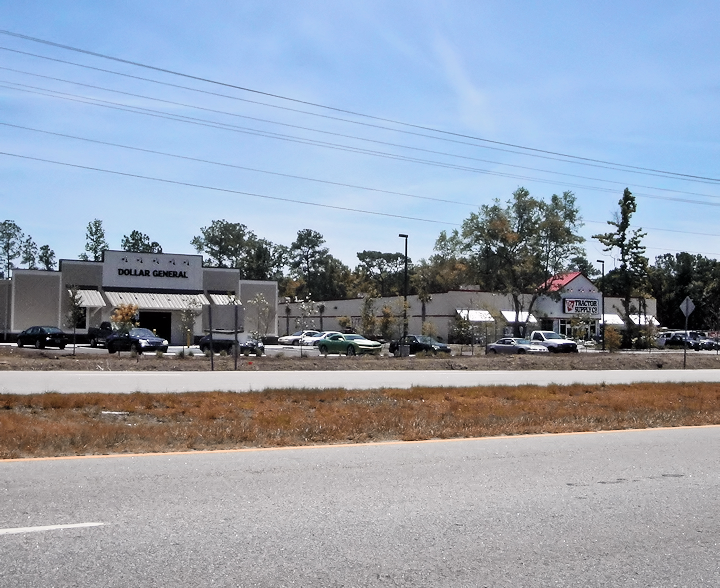
Stores Awendaw, South Carolina

== History ==
Awendaw was named by the Sewee tribe. Awendaw is thought to mean "Red Clay". It is also home to an oyster shell mound created by the Sewee tribe. It is the northernmost shell ring in a group that stretches south to the tip of Florida. Most of the mound is still intact. The rest of it was destroyed to construct roads and homes for the citizens of Awendaw. Awendaw was settled in 1696 as Wappetaw by settlers from Salem, Massachusetts, who had left after the Salem Witch Trials. The town was heavily damaged by Hurricane Hugo in September 1989, but did not receive as significant damage in 2004 when Hurricane Gaston made landfall in the region. In 1992, the town of Awendaw was first incorporated and elected Willam H. Alston as the first mayor. Alston served as mayor until 2009.

The Sewee Mound was listed on the National Register of Historic Places in 1970.

== Geography ==
Awendaw is located in northeastern Charleston County, along U.S. Route 17. US 17 leads southwest 28 miles (45 km) to Charleston and northeast 32 miles (51 km) to Georgetown.

According to the United States Census Bureau, Awendaw has a total area of 9.7 square miles (25.1 km^{2}), of which 9.5 square miles (24.5 km^{2}) is land and 0.2 square miles (0.5 km^{2}), or 2.13%, is water.

== Demographics ==
Historical population
Census	Pop.	Note	%±
2000	1,195		—
2010	1,294		8.3%
2020	1,399		8.1%
U.S. Decennial Census

=== 2020 census ===
Awendaw racial composition
Race	Num.	Perc.
White (non-Hispanic)	720	51.47%
Black or African American (non-Hispanic)	634	45.32%
Native American	3	0.21%
Other/Mixed	31	2.22%
Hispanic or Latino	11	0.79%

As of the 2020 United States census, there were 1,399 people, 514 households, and 328 families residing in the town.

=== 2000 census ===
As of the census of 2000, there were 1,195 people, 400 households, and 312 families residing in the town. The population density was 144.3 inhabitants per square mile (55.7/km^{2}). There were 443 housing units at an average density of 53.5 per square mile (20.7/km^{2}). The racial makeup of the town was 64.60% African American, 34.39% White, 0.08% Asian, 0.59% from other races, and 0.33% from two or more races. Hispanic or Latino of any race were 0.92% of the population.

There were 400 households, out of which 33.8% had children under the age of 18 living with them, 54.8% were married couples living together, 19.8% had a female householder with no husband present, and 22.0% were non-families. 20.3% of all households were made up of individuals, and 7.3% had someone living alone who was 65 years of age or older. The average household size was 2.97 and the average family size was 3.47.

In the town, the population was spread out, with 29.5% under the age of 18, 7.5% from 18 to 24, 27.8% from 25 to 44, 23.8% from 45 to 64, and 11.4% who were 65 years of age or older. The median age was 36 years. For every 100 females, there were 91.2 males. For every 100 females age 18 and over, there were 87.8 males.

The median income for a household in the town was $35,250, and the median income for a family was $42,917. Males had a median income of $31,696 versus $21,422 for females. The per capita income for the town was $15,781. About 13.5% of families and 12.4% of the population were below the poverty line, including 12.6% of those under age 18 and 18.1% of those age 65 or over.

== Government ==
The town is run by an elected council government system.

Mayor

- Miriam C. Green

Council members

- Erman Frank Frazier
- Wendy Helms
- Bryan McNeal, Jr.
- Darrell Ketchens
- Kent Prause
- Paul Brown

Administrator

- Gregory Saxton

Town Clerk

- Donna Steed

== Landmarks ==
The 609.6-meter-high (2,000 ft) WCSC-Tower is one of the world's tallest constructions. The Media General Tower is more than 600 m (2,000 ft) high.

In 2001, the town's public library was opened as the Awendaw Community Library. Currently named the William H. Alston Municipal Public Library, it is one of two municipal public libraries in the state.

== Education ==
Charleston County School District operates public schools in Awendaw.

In 2016, school district staff stated that they were considering having a new Lincoln High School built in Awendaw. The previous Lincoln High School in McClellanville closed in 2015.

As of January 2017, the school district is moving forward with plans for a new high school in Awendaw. Location to be a 184-acre tract on Doar Rd.

== Blue Crab Festival ==
To many Awendaw citizens, crabbing is a hobby and one of the town's main economic resources. Every year in the summer, the town has the Blue Crab Festival. Started by the town’s first mayor William H Alston and his wife Minnie E Alston.

== Notable person ==
- Danielle Howle, singer-songwriter
