= Custer Township, Michigan =

Custer Township is the name of some places in the U.S. state of Michigan:

- Custer Township, Antrim County, Michigan
- Custer Township, Mason County, Michigan
- Custer Township, Sanilac County, Michigan

== See also ==
- Custer, Michigan, a village in Mason County
- Custer Township (disambiguation)
