= A-frame building =

Architectural house or building styles

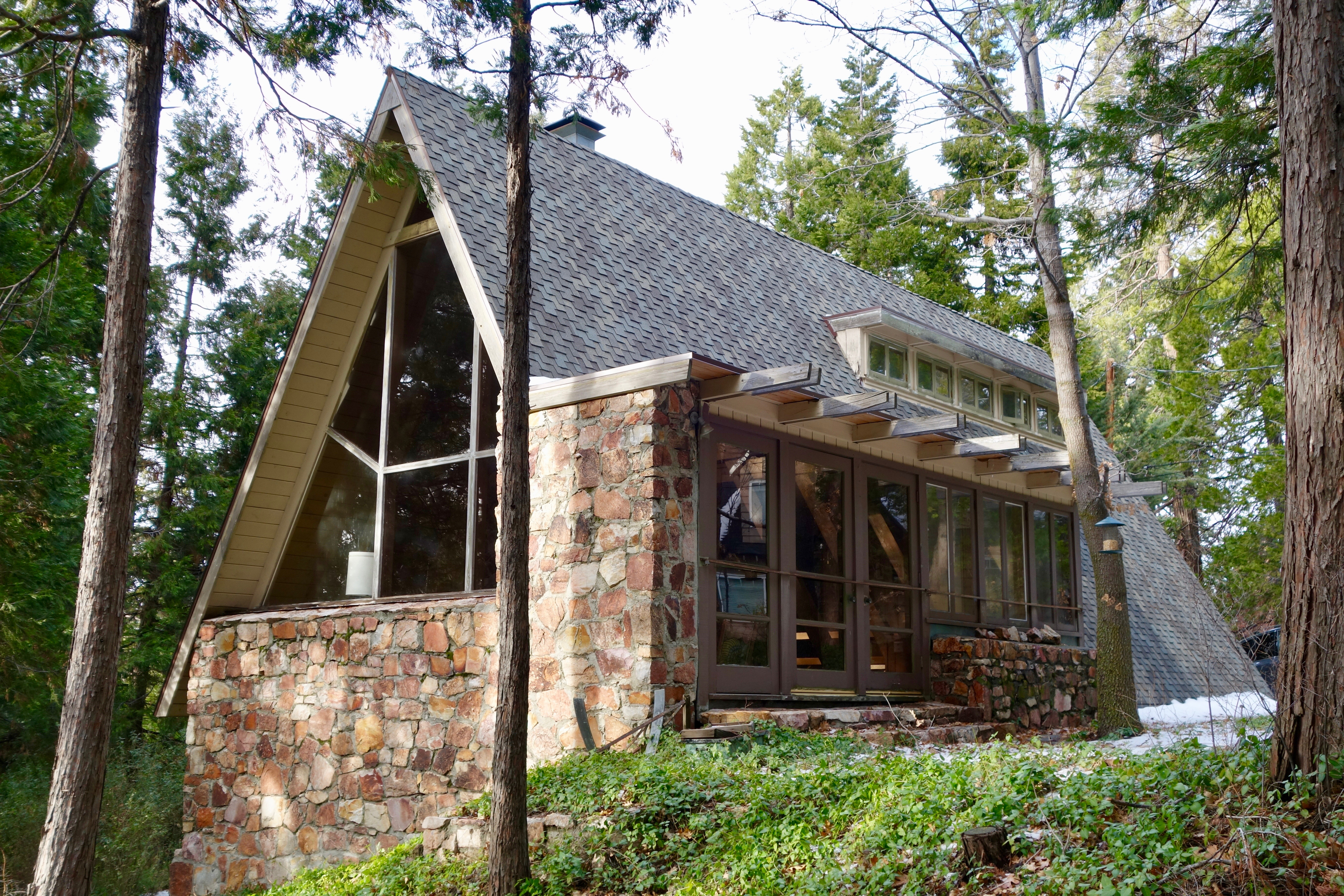
The Bennati House, in Lake Arrowhead, California. Rudolph Schindler's original A-frame design, 1934.

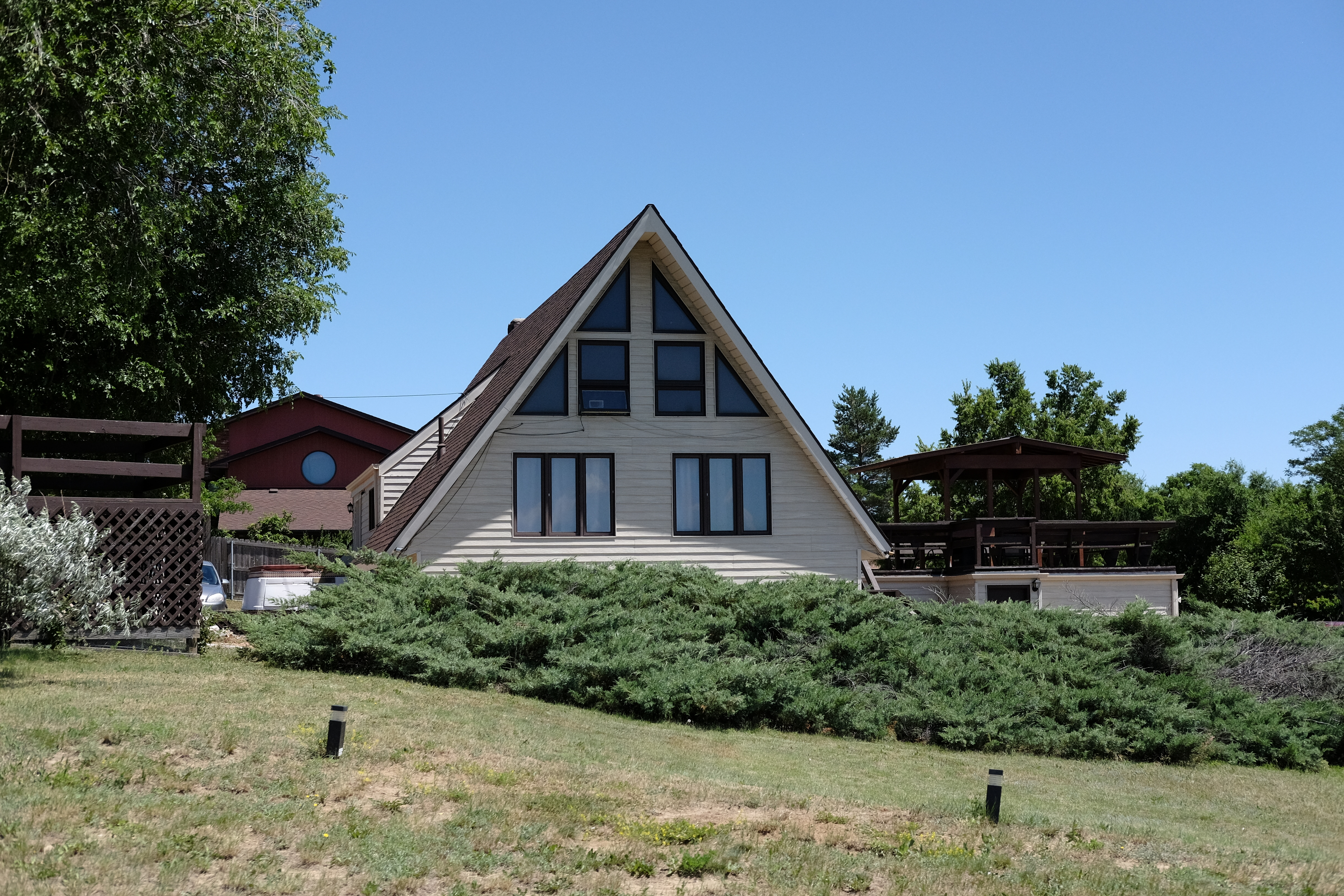
An example of an A-frame house in Gillette, Wyoming

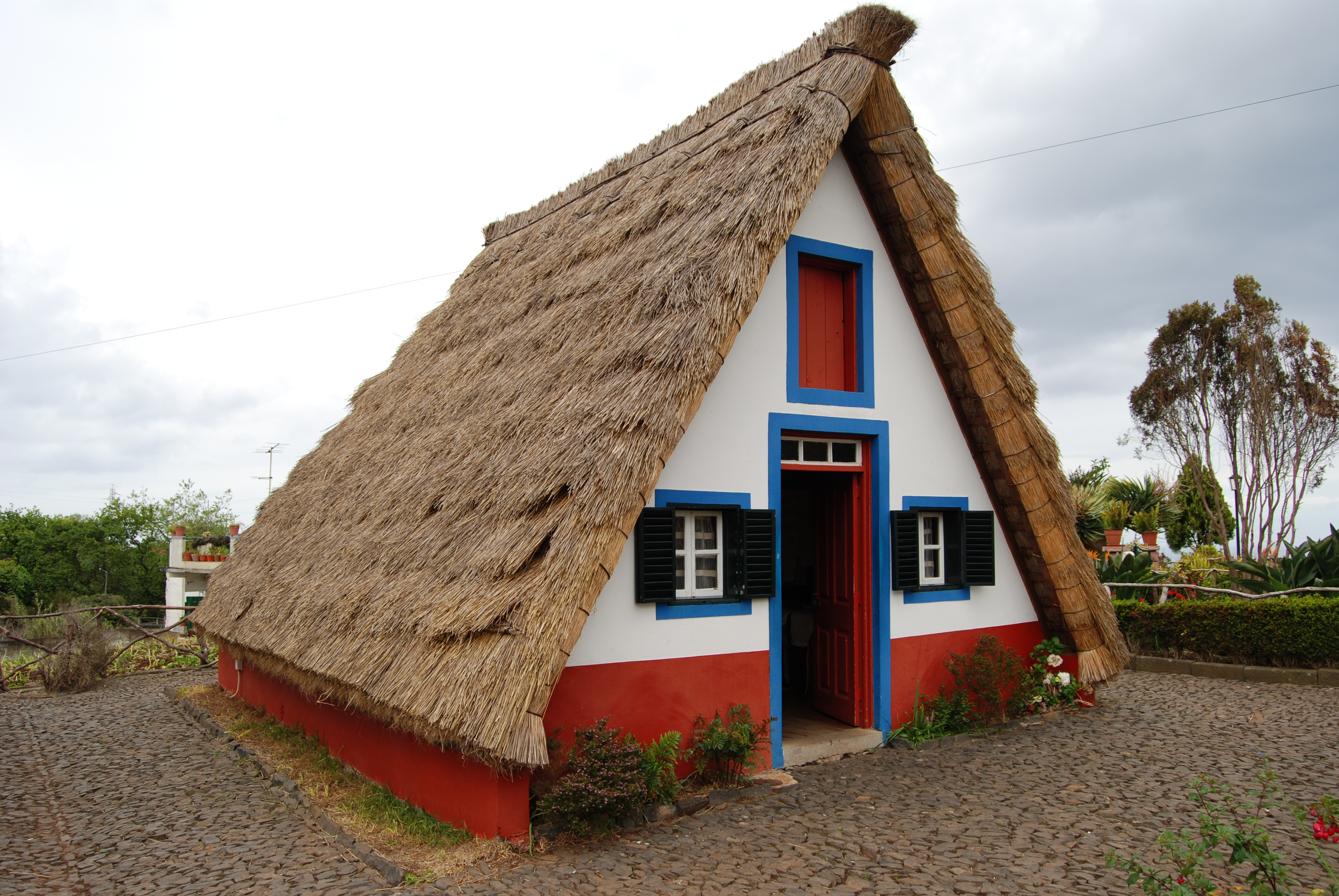
Traditional A-frame thatched house (palheiro), Santana, Madeira, Portugal

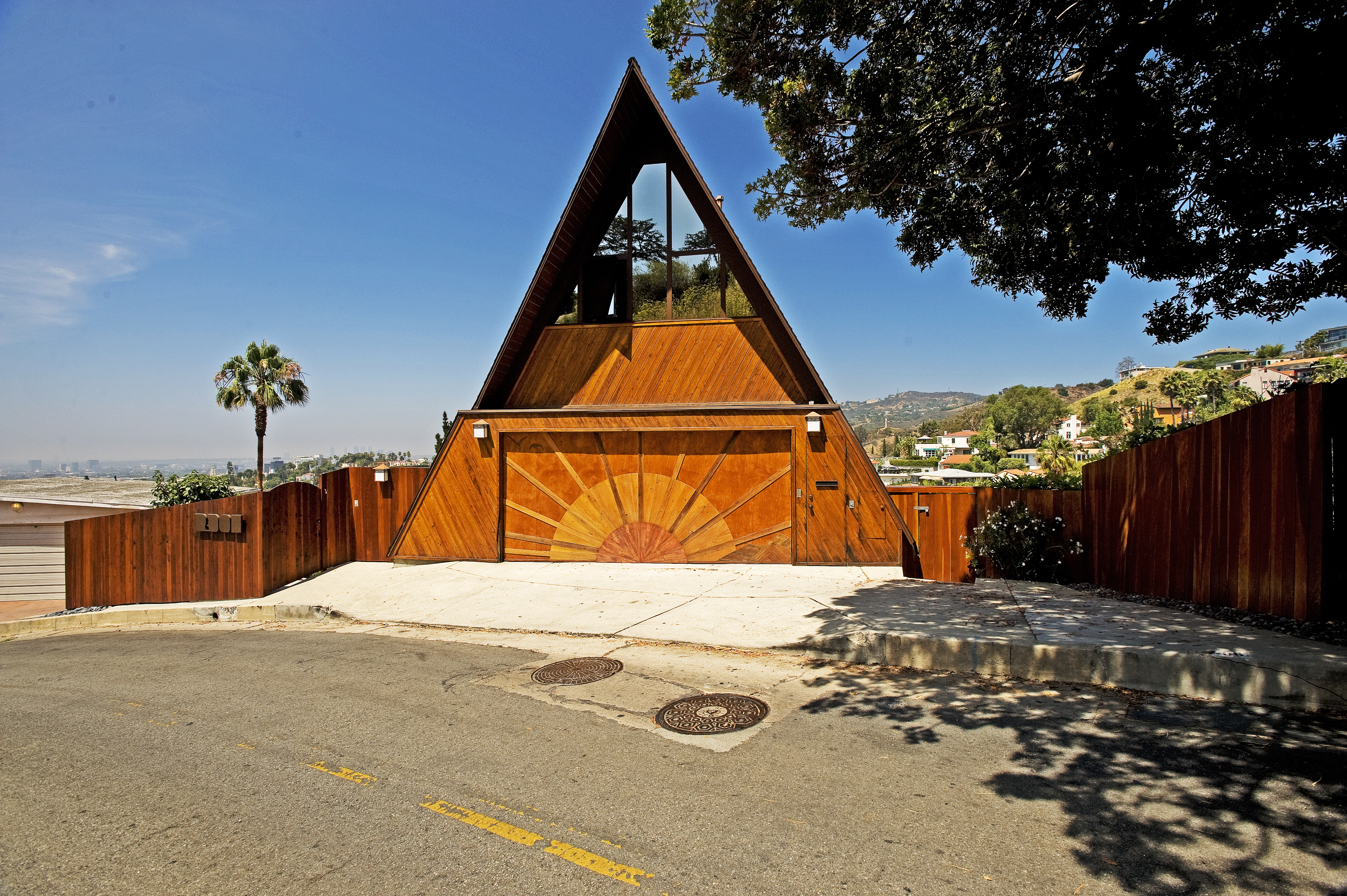
An A-frame house owned and restored by Nicky Panicci in the Hollywood Hills, an example of an architectural A-frame

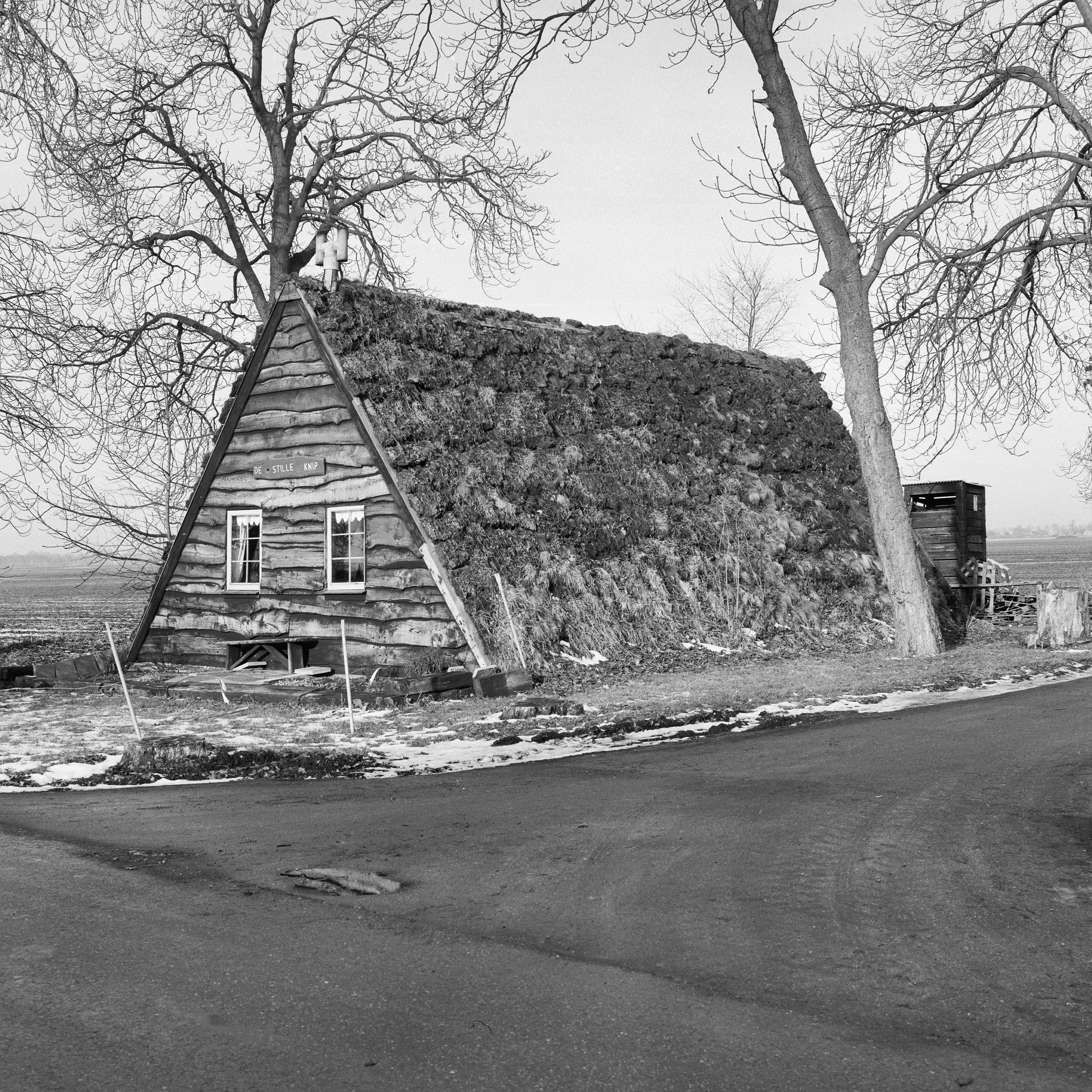
A historic photograph of an A-frame sod-roof house in the Netherlands. Image: Cultural Heritage Agency of the Netherlands 20309407 – RCE.

An A-frame building is an architectural style of building that features steeply-angled sides (roofline) that usually begin at or near the foundation line, and meet at the top in the shape of the letter A. An A-frame ceiling can be open to the top rafters.

Although the triangle shape of the A-frame has been present throughout history, it surged in popularity around the world from roughly the mid-1950s through the 1970s. It was during the post–World War II era that the A-frame acquired its most defining characteristics.

== Style ==
A-frame buildings are an ancient form in Europe (e.g. cruck frame construction or grubenhaus), China, and the South Pacific islands. Sometimes called a roof hut, these were simple structures used for utilitarian purposes until the 1950s. In 1934, R. M. Schindler built the first modern A-frame house, for owner Gisela Bennati, in Lake Arrowhead, California. Architects Walter Reemelin, John Campbell, George Rockrise, Henrik H. Bull, and Andrew Geller helped to popularize Schindler's idea in the early 1950s, designing A-frame vacation homes. In 1955, Andrew Geller built an A-frame house on the beach in Long Island, New York, known as the Elizabeth Reese House. Geller's design won international attention when it was featured in The New York Times on May 5, 1957. Before long, thousands of A-frame homes were being built around the world.

The Abbey Resort in Fontana-on-Geneva Lake, Wisconsin, claims to have the world's tallest wooden A-frame.

== Rise in popularity ==
The post–World War II popularity of the A-frame has been attributed to a combination of factors including Americans' extra disposable income, the inexpensiveness of building an A-frame structure, and a new interest in acquiring a second home for vacationing.

Another factor contributing to the rise of the A-frame included the adaptability of the structure itself, which enabled architects to experiment with more modern designs. A-frames were a useful medium in which architects could explore their creative side since they were relatively cheap to build.

Additionally, many people preferred the idea of a "modern-style" vacation home to that of a "modern-style" primary home. A-frames became available as prefabricated kits, lowering the cost even more, and were sold by Macy's department stores.

After the rise of the archetypal A-frame, architects soon began experimenting with new designs, which led to what became known as the modified A-frame style.

== Examples ==
=== Residential examples ===
- Bennati House (1934), Lake Arrowhead, California, designed by Rudolph Schindler
- Elizabeth Reese House, Sagoponack, New York, designed by Andrew Geller
- Numerous examples in Washington state.
- Numerous examples, including historic kits and (recent?) "Yosemite-adjacent" ones, in Curbed
- Twelve A-frame houses in Northcrest Historic District, Atlanta, Georgia
- Ranger cabin, Oregon, in Zig-zag Ranger District
- Park City, Utah, ski houses

=== Religious examples ===
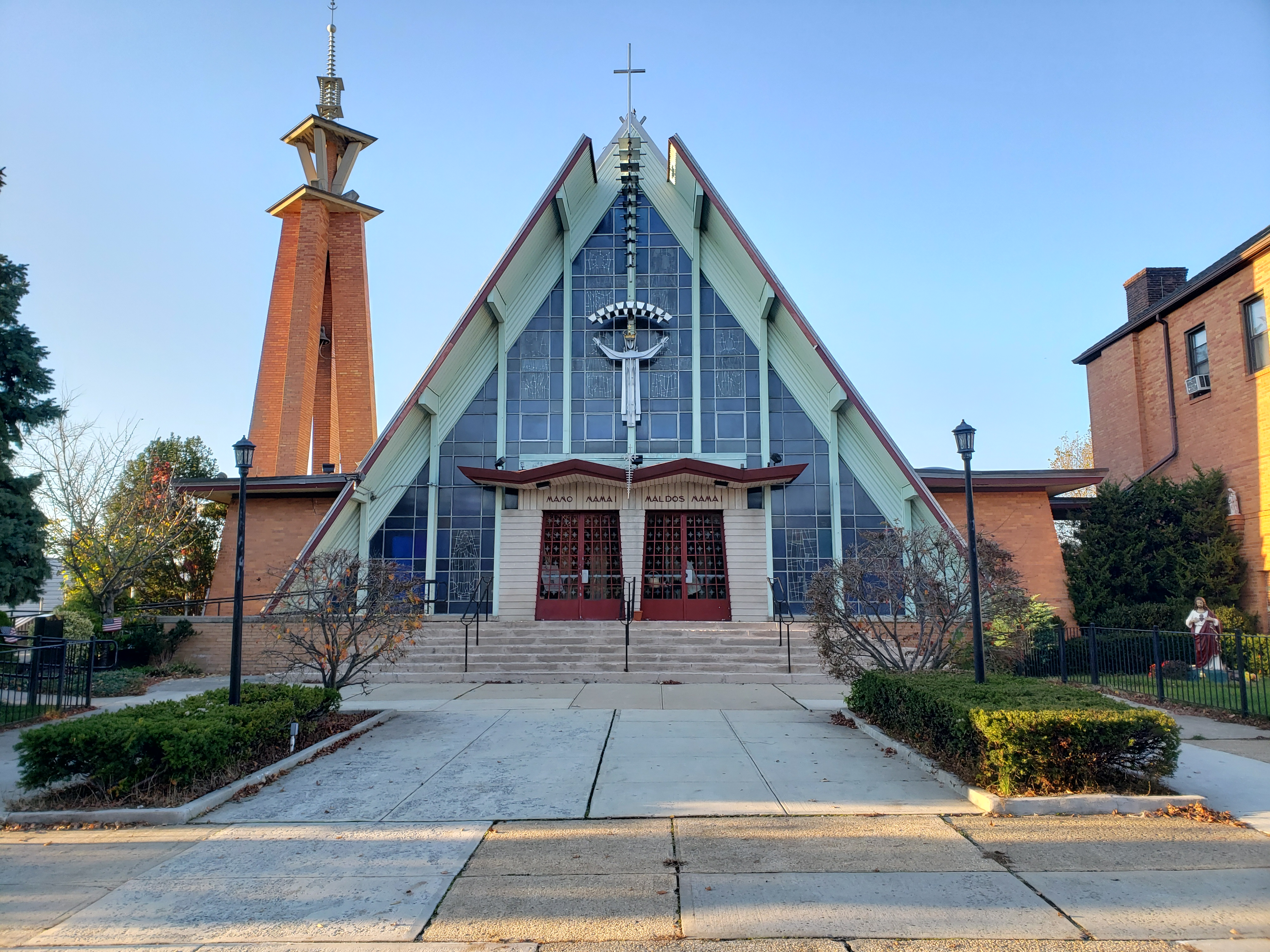
The Transfiguration Catholic Church, designed by Jonas Mulokas

A-frame buildings, which had been made popular since 1955 by Andrew Geller, were built for churches across the world. The modern shape was reinterpreted spiritually as representing "hands at prayer" since 1961 and the design of the Holy Cross Anglican Church in Tokyo by the Czech-born American architect Antonin Raymond. His use of interlaced pillars was inspired by the traditional Japanese traditional country minka houses known as gasshō-zukuri (合掌造り), literally "clasped-hands style".

Early examples of A-frame religious buildings are the Frank Lloyd Wright designed First Unitarian Society of Madison, built 1949–1951, as well as the Lutheran Church of the Atonement, designed by Harris Armstrong and built in 1949 in Florissant, Missouri. Charles E. Stade designed dozens of A-frame church buildings in the United States throughout the 1950s and 1960s, along with Edward D. Dart and Edward Sövik. Notable Lithuanian American A-frame churches were designed by Jonas Mulokas in the 1950s and 1960s, including his most recognized work, the Transfiguration Catholic Church in Queens, New York, and later St. Mary's Catholic Church in Custer, Michigan. The style was in 1960 used by the Catholic Church to build Saint Joseph Church, Lynden, Washington just before the Our Lady of Fatima Roman Catholic Church in 1961. The United States Air Force Academy Cadet Chapel inaugurated in 1962 is another example of A-frame construction in a religious building.

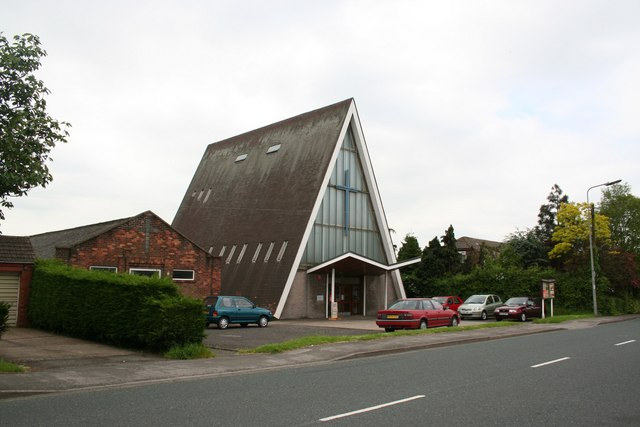
One of the earliest English A-shape churches, the Yaddlethorpe Methodist Church, built in 1967

At the same time, the A-frame used was in Europe as early 1959, for Bakkehaugen Church, in Norway, by architect Ove Bang, who was an advocate of functionalism. When the Arctic Cathedral in 1965, the A-frame church had become a new identity of religious architecture in Scandinavia. It spread to Europe and was used in 1967 to build the Yaddlethorpe Methodist Church in Yaddlethorpe.

The A-shape religious building made it across the Pacific Ocean to New Zealand, with the Whiteley Memorial Methodist Church, dedicated on 19 October 1963, considered "Taranaki's most beautiful building".

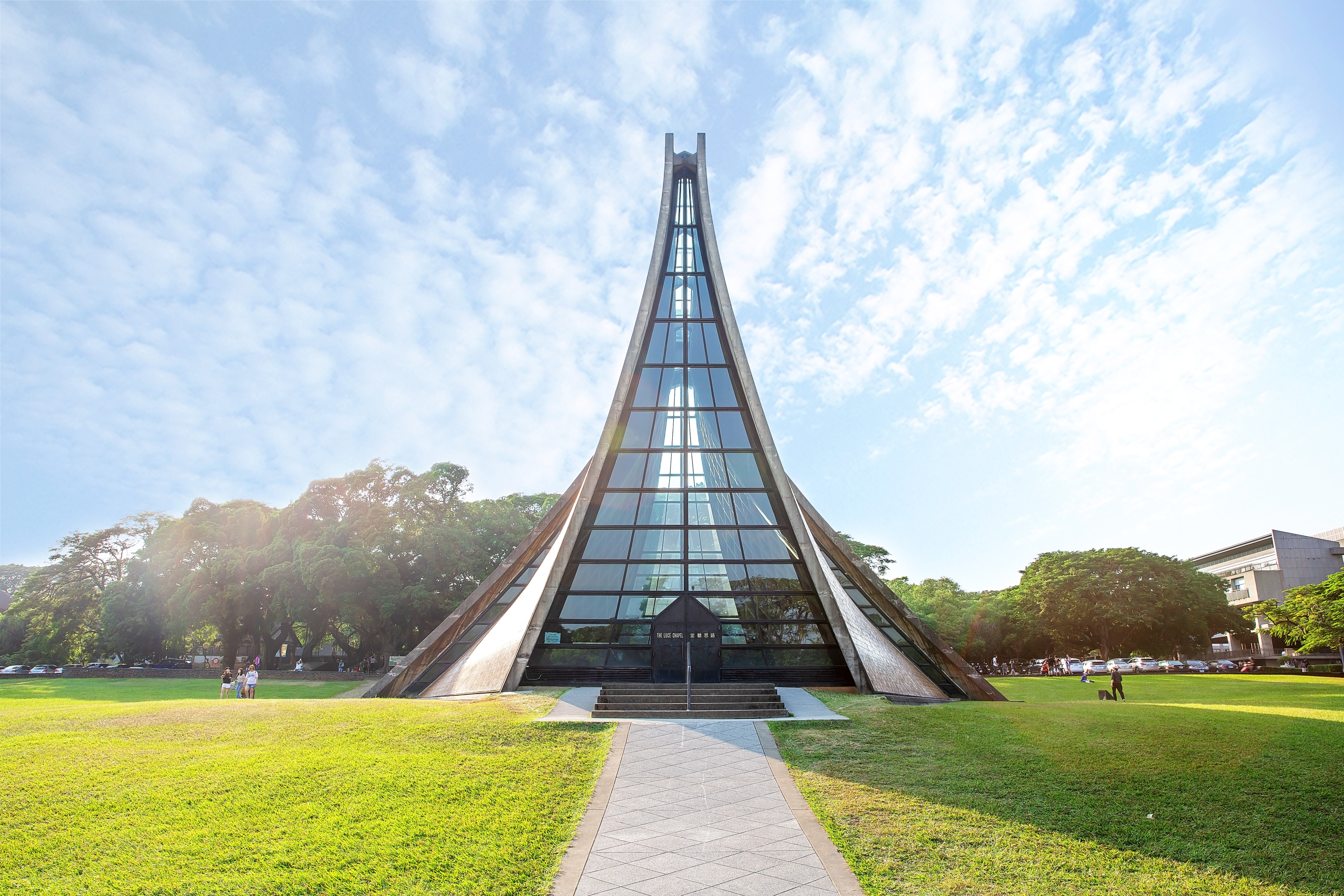
Luce Memorial Chapel, a modern A-frame building

Christian religious buildings have also adopted the A-style architecture in South East Asia. The first example after Japan might be the Luce Memorial Chapel in Taiwan, in 1963, followed by Saint Michael's Church in Sihanoukville, in 1965, Xavier Hall Catholic Church in Bangkok, in 1972, or the Church of the Pastoral Center in Da Lat, in 2010.

This style is still popular in Europe also, as in Henry's Ecumenical Art Chapel in Finland, in 2005.

=== Commercial examples ===
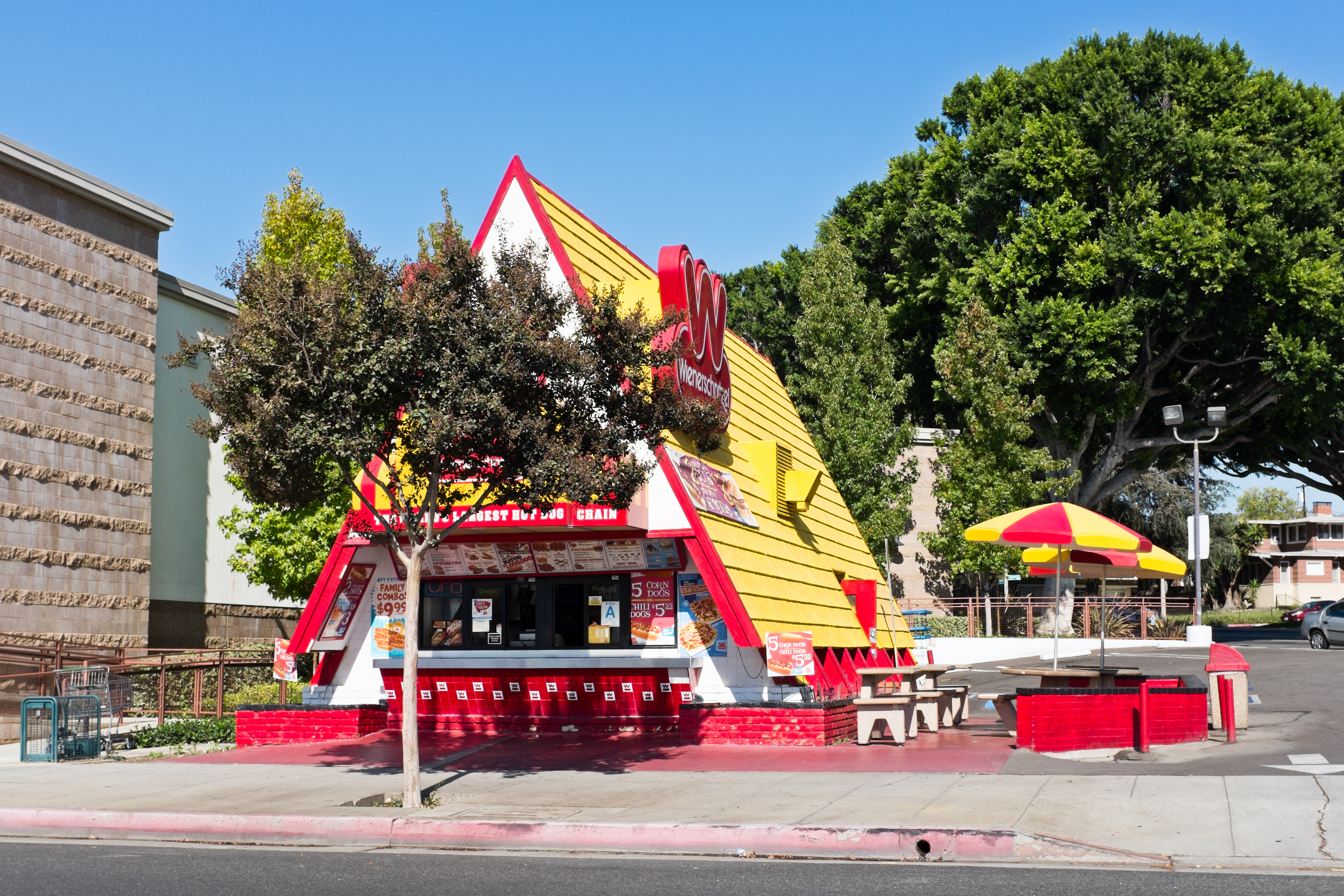
A-frame–roofed Wienerschnitzel restaurant in Whittier, California

- Numerous older Wienerschnitzel stores are A-frames
- Whataburger stores
- IHOP restaurants
- Tastee-Freez stores
- Nickerson Farms stores (e.g., see File:Abandoned Nickerson Farms, Picacho, AZ.jpg)
- Travelers Rest Motel, near Everett, Pennsylvania
- Dick Lewis Pontiac-Cadillac (1964), Olympia, Washington
- The main building of Florida's Disney's Contemporary Resort, in which the Walt Disney World monorail has a station
- Lake Easton Resort (c.1963), Easton, Washington
- Tiki Lodge (c.1964), Spokane, Washington

=== Educational examples ===
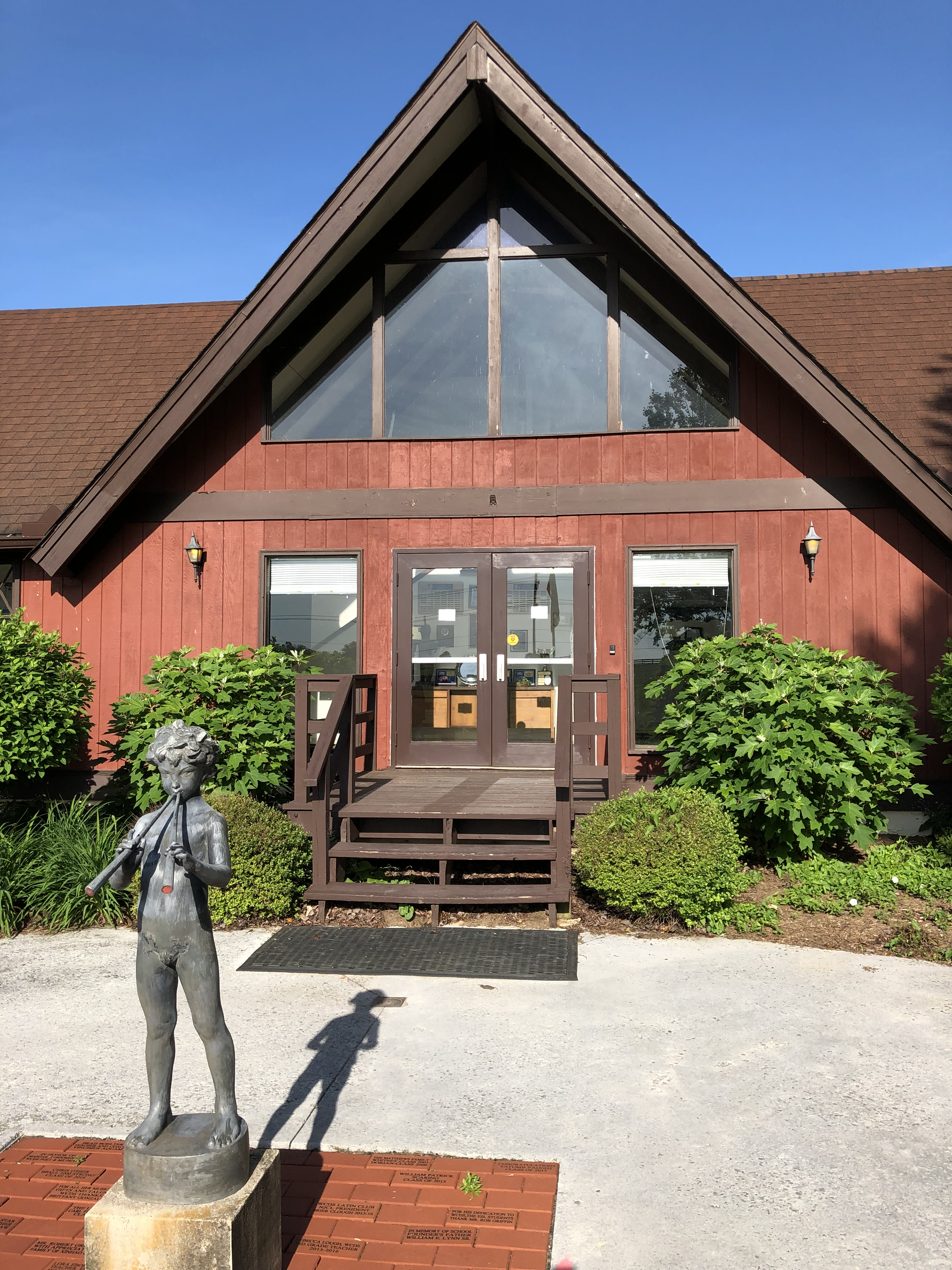
Wakefield Country Day School

- Wakefield Country Day School, Flint Hill, Virginia
- Vancouver Maritime Museum uses a large A-frame building to house the arctic expedition ship St. Roch

== See also ==
- Minka
- Vernacular architecture

== Bibliography ==
- Randl, Chad (2004). A-frame. Princeton Architectural Press. ISBN 978-1-56898-410-0.
