= Notipekago =

Notipekago may refer to:

- Not-A-Pe-Ka-Gon Site
- Mason County, Michigan, named Notipekago County from 1840 to 1843
