= St. Mary's Catholic Church (Custer, Michigan) =

Church in Custer, Michigan, United States

Coordinates: 43.9534°N 86.2206°W

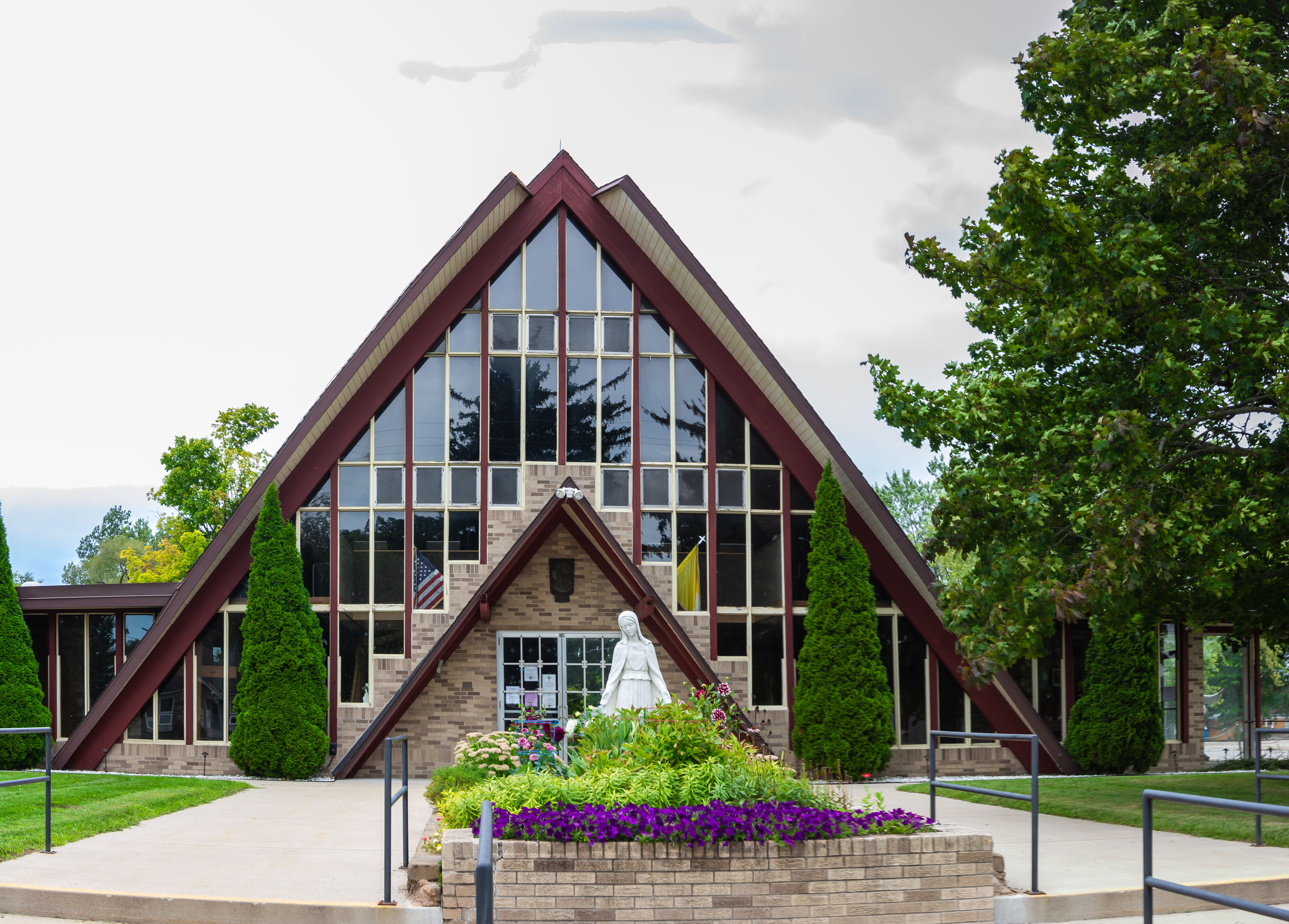
- Main façade of St. Mary's Catholic Church
- Interactive map of the St. Mary's Catholic Church area

General information
- Architectural style: Modernist
- Location: 85 S Madison Ave., Custer, Michigan, United States
- Completed: 1966

Design and construction
- Architect: Jonas Mulokas

Website
- www.stmarycuster.org

St. Mary's Catholic Church is a Roman Catholic church of the Diocese of Grand Rapids located in Custer, Michigan. Established in 1933, it continues to be a place of worship for Catholic residents of Custer and Scottville, Michigan following the closure of St. Jerome in Scottville in 2012.

== History ==
=== Original structure ===
A community of Lithuanians began to settle in Custer, Michigan around 1912 and following World War I, the community grew further. The St. Mary's parish was originally established in 1933 with a Lithuanian priest, though the church itself lacked a Lithuanian identity.

=== Current structure ===
When Father B. Marčiulionis became the priest for the parish, he contacted Lithuanian American architect Jonas Mulokas. In their correspondences, Father Marčiulionis shared with Mulokas that the parish had a limited budget, with Mulokas saying that "the church lost its characteristic originality" due to the funding changes. Shortly before construction was completed, Father Ernst J. Bernotas was named as the priest for St. Mary's.

When completed in 1966, the new St. Mary's church shared design elements with Mulokas' earlier award-winning work, the Transfiguration Catholic Church in Queens, New York. Similar to the Transfiguration Catholic Church, the structure of the church is a modernist, A-frame building that has an adjacent bell tower. The interior features an altar displaying Lithuanian textile design elements and a backing wall made of multicolored bricks.

In 2012, the parish of St. Jerome in Scottville, Michigan merged with St. Mary's creating the St. Mary–St. Jerome Parish. Following the retirement of the pastor of St. Simon in Ludington, Michigan, the St. Mary–St. Jerome Parish created a "cluster" with the St. Simon Parish, sharing a pastor.
