= Henrik H. Bull =

American architect

Henrik Helkand Bull (July 13, 1929 – December 3, 2013) was a founder of Bull Stockwell Allen / BSA Architects in San Francisco in 1967.

== Personal life ==
Henrik Helkand Bull was the only child of Johan Bull (1893–1945) and Sonja Geelmuyden Bull (1898–1992). Johan Bull, a native of Norway, was an illustrator who regularly contributed to New Yorker magazine since its inception in 1925.

A cousin of Bull’s grandfather, also named Henrik Bull, designed several of Oslo’s landmark civic buildings at the end of the 19th century. This earlier Henrik Bull was nephew of the famed violinist Ole Bull, who began the utopian community of Oleona in Pennsylvania in 1853.

In 1954, Bull moved to San Francisco and began working for a firm in Oakland until 1956. He married Barbara Alpaugh in 1956 and had two children, Nina (1966) and Peter (1965). He then opened his own business and Bull's firm merged with two other firms "to form Bull Field Volkmann Stockwell in 1967".

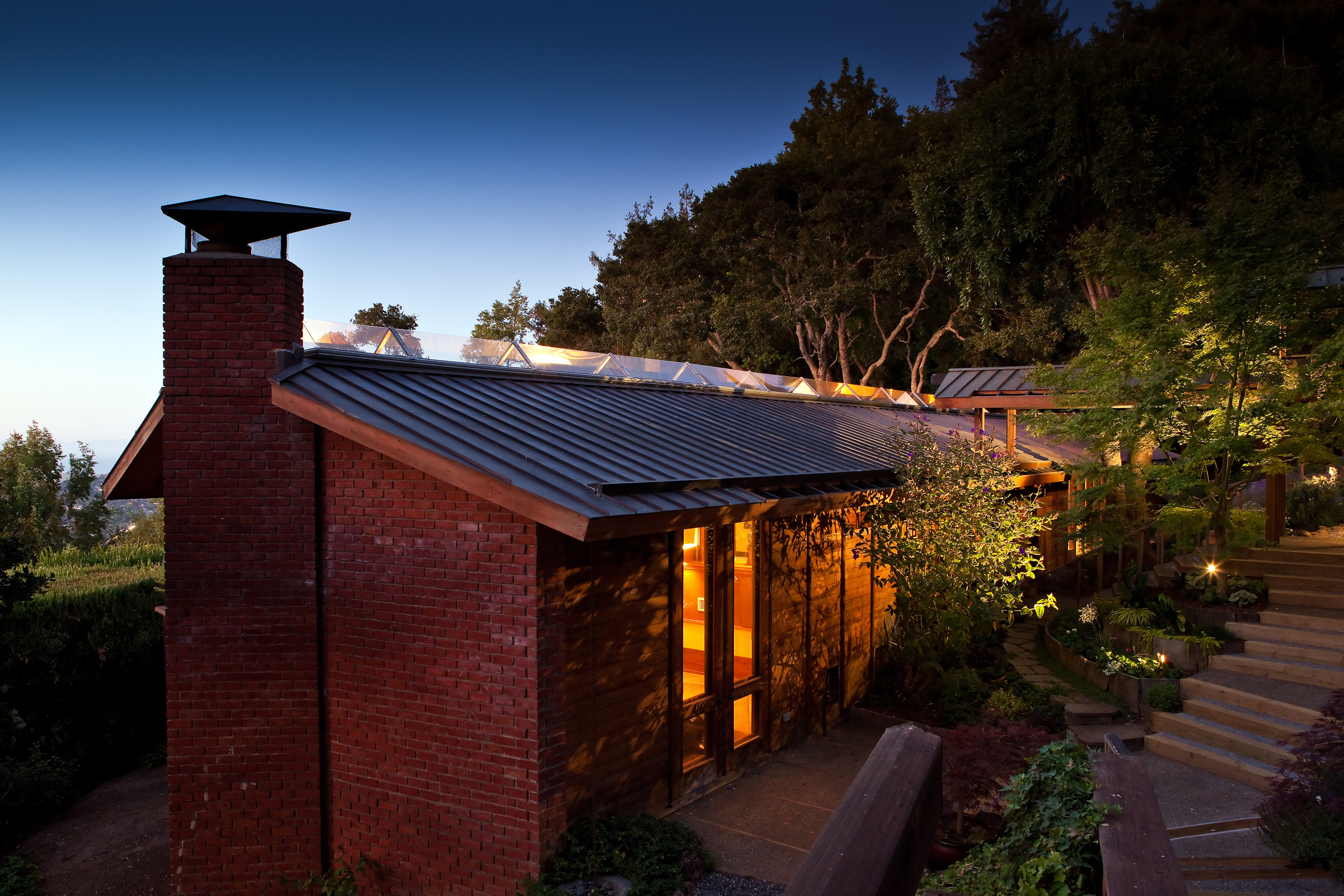
San Rafael, CA home view 1- by Henrik H Bull

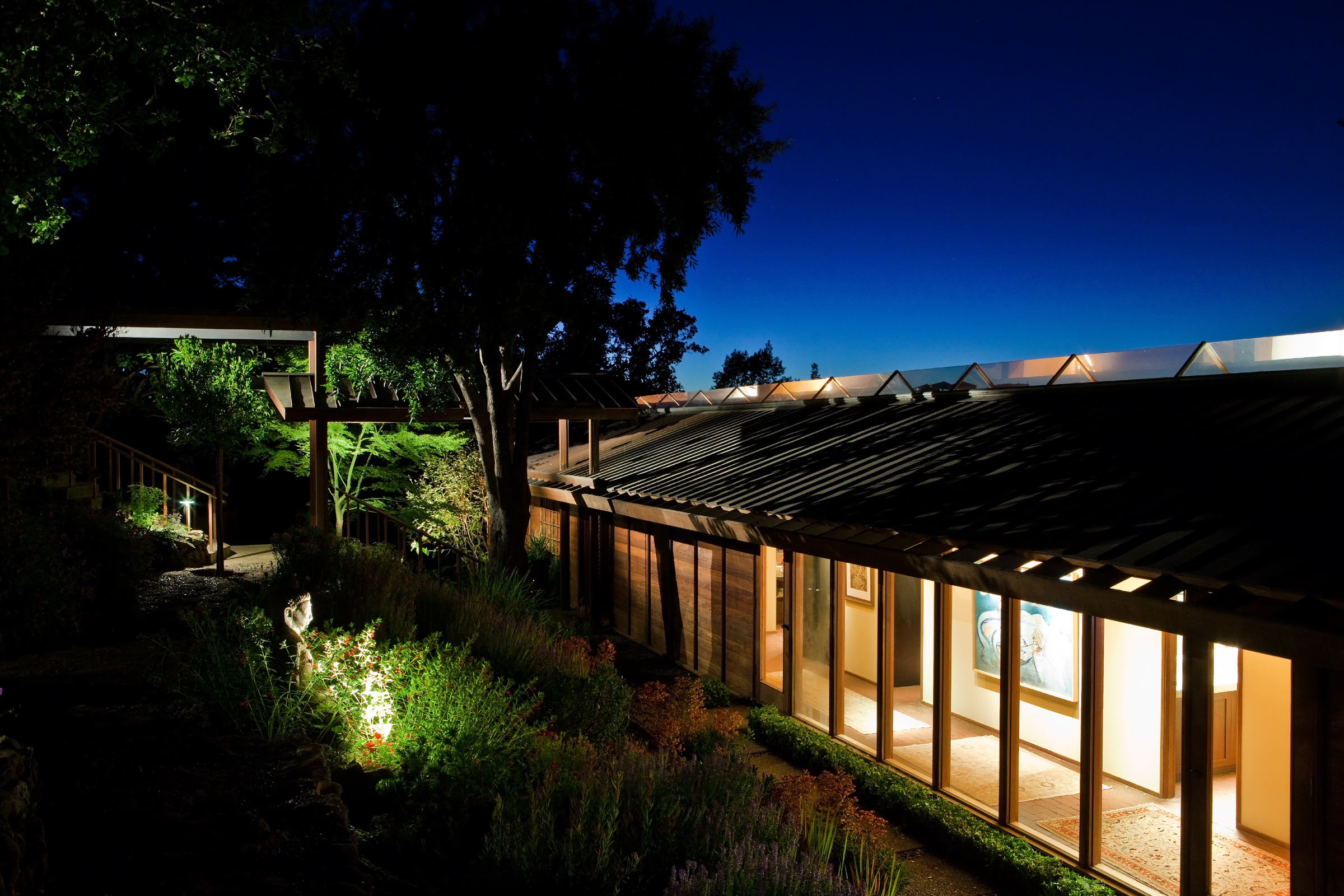
San Rafael, CA home View 2- designed by Henrik H Bull

== Career ==
Bull worked one summer in San Francisco with Mario Corbett. Corbett was one of the leaders of a regionalist architecture movement along with Joseph Esherick, Gardner Dailey, Campbell & Wong and Warren Callister. Bull began his studies at MIT (Massachusetts Institute of Technology) in aeronautical engineering, and switched to architecture after the first year. Bull studied with Ralph Rapson, Buckminster Fuller, Alvar Aalto, and graduated in 1952.

As a first lieutenant in the USAF, Bull was stationed at MIT Lincoln Laboratory and worked with Buckminster Fuller on developing the geodesic radar domes for the Distant Early Warning Line (DEW Line) system at the north slope of Alaska. In 1954, Bull returned to San Francisco to work again with Mario Corbett.

On the basis of being commissioned to design several ski cabins, Bull opened his own architectural office in 1956. Bull's early practice included homes, condominiums and later hotels and institutional buildings.

Sunset Magazine published articles on Bull, twice putting his projects on the cover of their magazine, giving him numerous design awards, and enlisting him as a competition judge. In 1962, he was chosen to design the Sunset Magazine Discovery House: a "dream house" limited to 2,000 square feet (190 m^{2}). Bull designed the home as a series of four skylit pavilions built around an enclosed courtyard. It was the first home built in the newly established town of El Dorado Hills.

In the 1950s and the 1960s, Henrik Bull designed several prefabricated or kit cabins. He built the very first A-Frame ski cabin in the United States with his friend John Flender in Stowe, Vermont in 1953. The essence of a good cabin, according to Bull, is that it should be simple and economical, but also fun, different and exciting.

In 1967, Henrik Bull, John Field, Sherwood Stockwell and Daniel Volkmann formed Bull Field Volkmann Stockwell. Their first large project together was the planning and architecture for Northstar at Tahoe, a new four season resort. The firm has continued under the following names: Bull Field Volkmann Stockwell; Bull Volkmann Stockwell; Bull Stockwell Allen; Bull Stockwell Allen & Ripley; and is now called Bull Stockwell Allen / BSA Architects.

== Ideological position ==
Bull directly related his design philosophy to the "Bay Area Style" (also called "Bay Region School"). This movement is a continuation of an earlier period of architecture practiced by such people as Bernard Maybeck, Julia Morgan, Greene & Greene, Willis Polk and Ernest Coxhead who were influenced by the British Arts and Crafts Movement as well as the Japanese architecture.

Because Bull believed that modern architecture should be warm as well as really sensitive to the topography and climate, he was classified both in the Northern California Modernism and the Bay Area Style. The question of an appropriate architecture for its location was always Henrik Bull’s main concern. He felt that a building of quality did not unnecessarily disturb the site and should be comprehensible to everyone. Buildings should expose frankly their structures and be designed in relation to the climate, so that outdoor living spaces are a continuation of the interior. According to Henrik Bull, the timeless value of architecture should be achieved in choosing natural materials appropriate to the site, crafting them well and being conscious of the effect of time and weather so the building can become richer with time. Creating lasting architecture is also achieved by placing priority on client needs and relationship to the site. This should form a triangular relationship: the human with the building, the building with the site, and the human with the site.

== Awards and recognition ==
Bull received 43 major design awards for work he personally designed, or under his direct design leadership. In 1978, Bull Field Volkmann Stockwell won an invited competition for planning the proposal new capital city of Alaska with Bull as co-principal in charge.

The firm received 75 major design awards including the Firm Award from the AIA California Council in 1989, "in recognition of distinguished architecture in a form’s overall body of work".

== Activities and public service ==
Bull was elected vice president (1967) and president (1968) of the American Institute of Architects / San Francisco Chapter (AIA SF), and elected to Fellowship in National AIA in 1969. He was also part of the National AIA’s Committees (Housing Committee in 1967; and Scholarship Committee in 1974).

His other activities included: Golden Gate Bridge Design Review Committee (1997 to 2001), president of the Architectural Heritage Association of Berkeley (1975), Citizen Advisory Committee for the San Francisco Urban Design Plan (1970), MIT Education Council (1960 to 1989), and architect representative on the Seismic Investigation and Hazards Survey Advisory Committee of San Francisco (1981–1985).

== Significant achievements ==
- 1955–1960: Numerous award-winning vacation houses in the Lake Tahoe area.
- 1957–1967: Single-family houses in the Bay Area, several design awards.
- 1958: Restoration of the Sentinel Building (now called Columbus) in San Francisco, an early example of historic preservation. Featured in Architectural Forum and in several newspaper articles.
- 1961: Christ Church Parish Hall, Sausalito. Design award from Guild for Religious Architecture.
- 1962: Sunset Discovery House, El Dorado Hills, CA. Featured in House and Home Magazine and Life Magazine. Homes for Better Living Award.
- 1963–1966: Tahoe Tavern Condominiums, the first highend condominium project at Lake Tahoe. Governor’s Design Award.
- 1965: Snowmass Villas, the first condominiums at the new Snowmass resort in Colorado (with Ian Mackinlay). Progressive Architecture Awards.
- 1967: Formation of Bull Field Volkmann Stockwell.
- 1969: Takaro Lodge, Te Anau, New Zealand, a hunting and fishing resort on the South Island. The first overseas project and first using a "charette" process working with the clients and on site.
- 1971: Northstar at Tahoe, master planning, design of village and of 400 condominiums. AIA Northern California Design Award.
- 1978: Winner of invited competition for the planning of the proposed new capital city of Alaska, the site being a 100 square miles (260 km^{2}) of wilderness between Anchorage and Fairbanks. In 1982, the move from the present capital at Juneau was defeated 48 to 52%.
- 1980: Spruce Saddle Mountain Restaurant, Beaver Creek, CO, the first building at the new Beaver Creek resort. "Best Day Lodge" Snow Country Magazine Award.
- 1981: Bear Valley Visitor Center, Point Reyes National Seashore, CA. President’s Design Award for Accessibility, California Department of Rehabilitation.
- 1988: The Inn at Spanish Bay, Pebble Beach, CA. Article entitled: "Very large hotel respectful to nature and its neighbors" by Donald Carty in Architecture Magazine, July 1988. AIA Monterey Chapter Design Award, Gold Nugget Award, National Association of Home Builders.

== Publications ==
=== Publications ===
- Projects by Henrik Bull have been featured in magazines such as: Atlantic, Architectural Forum, Snow Country Magazine, Architecture California, Progressive Architecture, Architectural Record, Architectural Forum, House and Home, Housing Architecture, San Francisco Chronicle, Sunset, A&U Magazine (Japan), and Baumeister (Germany).

=== Articles ===
- Henrik Bull wrote several articles as a mountain building expert. He has been a regular contributor to Ski Area Management (1973–1999) and to Snow Country Magazine (1973–1998). He also wrote articles for Architecture California and Fine Home building Magazine.

=== Conferences ===
- In 2000, Henrik Bull was invited to present a paper entitled "Lessons to be learned from indigenous architecture" at the Fourth International Conference on Snow Engineering at Trondheim, Norway.
- In 1982, Henrik Bull presented a paper entitled "Potential Seismic Hazard versus certain personal disaster" at a seismic conference sponsored by the National Science Foundation held at the University of California at Berkeley. In this paper Bull suggested that collapse of freeways presented a greater danger than collapse of masonry buildings. In the 1989 Loma Prieta earthquake, 42 people were killed at the Cypress freeway collapse. Eight people died from falling masonry, and no masonry buildings collapsed.

=== Featured projects in books ===
- Klaussen Brown Cabin, featured as one of the six American houses in Modern Houses of the World, by Sherban Cantacuzino (London, 1964).
- Sims and Lyon Houses, description by Charles Moore, FAIA, featured in Bay Area Houses, (Gibbs M. Smith Inc, 1988).
- Klaussen Belvedere House and Klaussen Brown Cabin, featured in NorCalMod, Icons of Northern California Modernism, by Pierluigi Serraino (San Francisco, 2006).
- Flender Cabin, Edwards Cabin and Klaussen first cabin in Squaw Valley, featured in Randl, Chad (2004). A-frame. ISBN 1-56898-410-3.
