= Kossuth Colony Historic District =

Historic district in Ohio, United States

- U.S. National Register of Historic Places
- U.S. Historic district
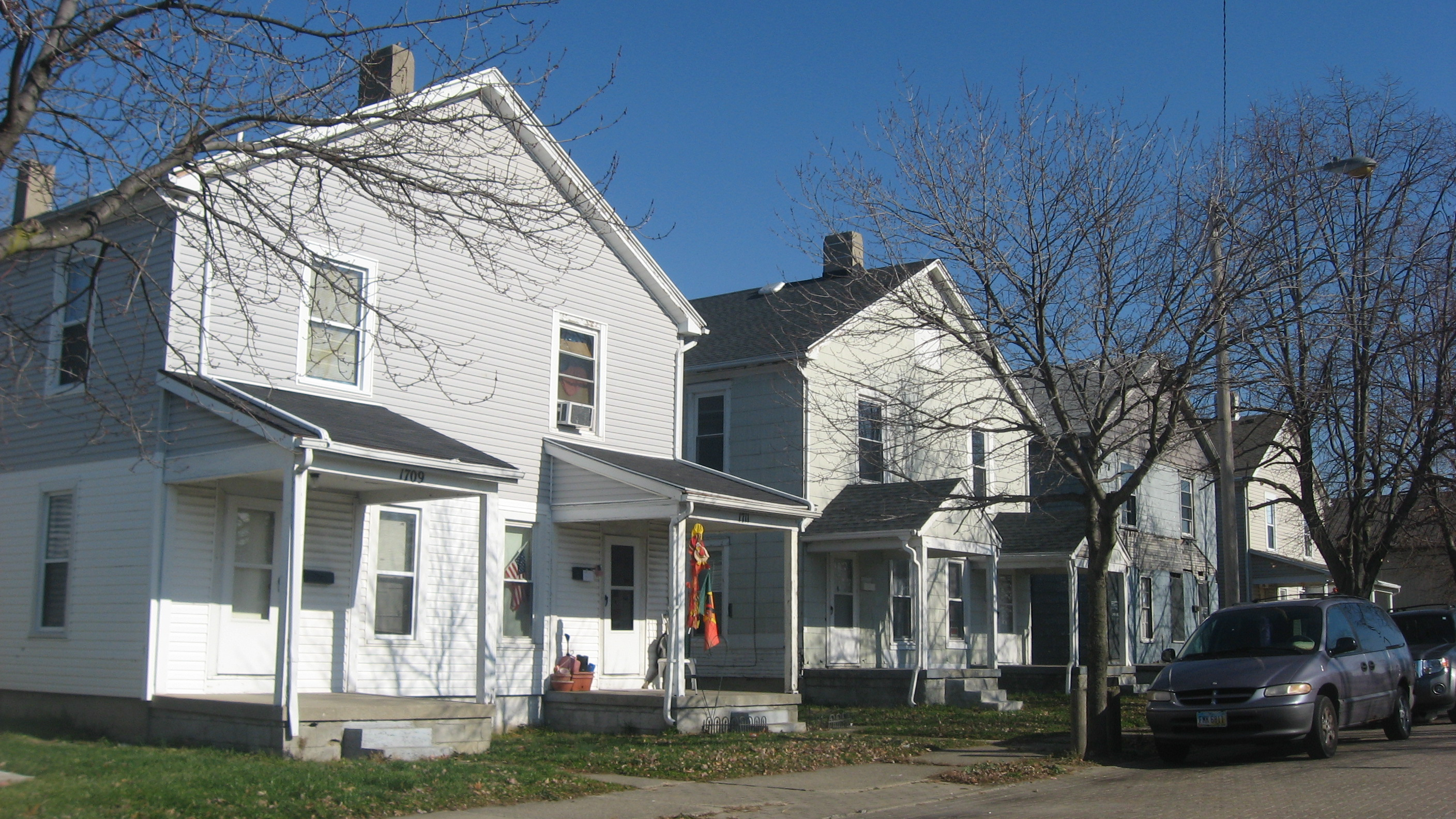
- Houses on Mack Avenue

- Location within Ohio Location within the United States
- Location: Baltimore St., Mack and Notre Dame Aves., Dayton, Ohio
- Coordinates: 39°47′0″N 84°10′17″W
- Built: 1906
- Architect: Jacob Doffee Moskowitz
- NRHP reference No.: 79001900
- Added to NRHP: December 21, 1979

The Kossuth Colony Historic District, named for Lajos Kossuth, is a nationally recognized historic district bounded by Baltimore Street, Mack Avenue and Notre Dame Avenue in Dayton, Ohio. The Kossuth Colony was built in 1906 to house Hungarian immigrant workers for the Barney and Smith Car Company, a rail car manufacturer that ranked among Dayton's largest and most venerable firms. Comparatively few changes have been made to the forty houses in the colony, although the houses' white picket fences have been removed. Many houses in the district are simple gable-front residences with minimal setbacks, and asbestos siding covers many exterior walls in the district.

On December 21, 1979, Kossuth Colony was added to the National Register of Historic Places; it qualified both as an important example of architecture and because of its connection to Jacob Doffee Moskowitz, the labor contractor who was responsible for bringing the Hungarians and constructing the complex. The colony has also been named a historic district by the city of Dayton; one of eighteen districts citywide, it is the only one located northeast of downtown Dayton.

== See also ==
- National Register of Historic Places listings in Dayton, Ohio
- Old North Dayton, Dayton, Ohio
