= Old North Dayton, Dayton, Ohio =

Coordinates: 39°47′N 84°10′W

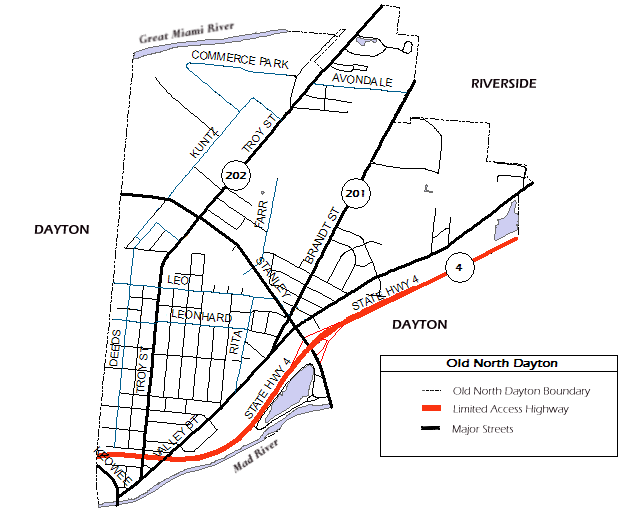
Old North Dayton, located north of downtown Dayton between the Great Miami and Mad Rivers, Ohio

Old North Dayton is a neighborhood northeast of downtown Dayton, between the Great Miami and Mad rivers. Its main routes are Troy, Brandt, Valley, Stanley, Leo and Chapel Streets.

German immigrants were the first to settle in the neighborhood, then known as 'Texas' or 'Parma'. Around the turn of the 20th century, central European immigrants, predominantly Poles, Hungarians, Lithuanians and Germans, moved in as laborers and gave the neighborhoods its unique ethnic flavor represented by ethnic Roman Catholic churches, cultural festivals, social clubs, and a central European specialty restaurant, the Amber Rose. In the 2010s, the neighborhood became home to hundreds of resettled Turkish immigrants.

Points of interest in the neighborhoods include the Amber Rose, Our Lady of the Rosary Catholic Church (German), St. Adalbert's Catholic Church (Polish) - closed, St. Stephen's Catholic Church (Hungarian) - closed, Holy Cross Catholic Church (Lithuanian), and the historic Kossuth Colony. The main campus of the Dayton Children's Hospital as well as Ronald McDonald House Charities Dayton are also in Old North Dayton.

The neighborhood is home to the Stuart Patterson Park. Formerly known as Walters Grove, the park was renamed in honor of Stuart Patterson, the nephew of John H. Patterson, who died in a plane crash at nearby McCook Field. Stuart Patterson Park is home to the Francis Fitzsimmons Senior Citizens Center.

State Routes 201 (Valley and Brandt Streets) and 202 (Troy St.) provide access to downtown Dayton, Riverside, and Huber Heights. Ohio State Route 4 provides access to Interstate 75, Interstate 70, U.S. Route 35, and Interstate 675.

On May 27, 2019, the neighborhood suffered significant losses from an EF4 tornado, the worst of a series which affected the greater Miami Valley. Multiple homes and businesses were a complete loss, with areas of the neighborhood losing power and water for several days.
