= Holy Cross Lithuanian Roman Catholic Church =

Historic church in Ohio, United States

- U.S. National Register of Historic Places
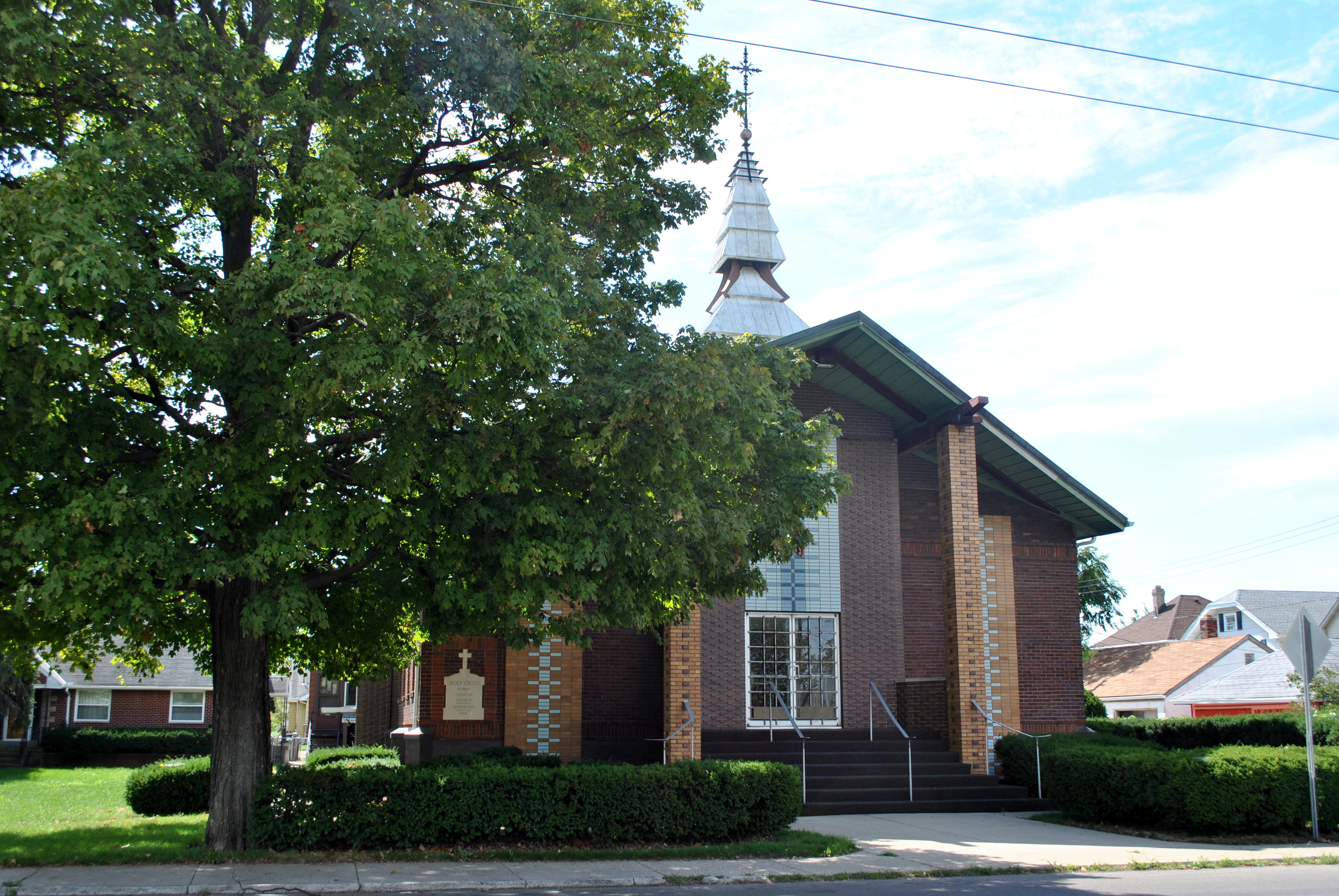

- Location within Ohio Location within the United States
- Location: 1924 Leo St., Dayton, Ohio
- Coordinates: 39°46′53″N 84°10′4″W
- Area: 1.2 acres (0.49 ha)
- Built: 1965
- Architect: Jonas Mulokas
- Architectural style: Lithuanian ethnic
- MPS: European Ethnic Communities, Dayton MPS
- NRHP reference No.: 91001582
- Added to NRHP: November 5, 1991

Holy Cross Lithuanian Roman Catholic Church is a historic church in Dayton, Ohio, United States. Built in 1914 by Lithuanian immigrants, the church has been a fixture in the community since then. The church has ornate Lithuanian folk art stained glass windows depicting religious symbolism and the life of Jesus Christ.

An annual, popular fundraiser is the turtle soup and kugelis sale each November. Though turtle soup is not a traditional Lithuanian dish, it was made popular by the Old North Dayton Lithuanian community during World War II when other meats were scarce.

Designed by Jonas Mulokas, it was built in 1965 and added to the National Register of Historic Places in 1991.

== See also ==
- National Register of Historic Places listings in Dayton, Ohio
