= Jonas Mulokas =

Jonas Mulokas (born 18 February 1907 in Vilnius, Lithuania; died 31 May 1983 in Santa Monica, United States) was an architect and engineer.

== Works ==
- 1957: Nativity of the Blessed Virgin Mary Church in Chicago, Illinois
- 1962: Transfiguration Catholic Church in Queens, New York
- 1963–1964: Holy Cross Lithuanian Roman Catholic Church in Dayton, Ohio, celebrating the parish's 50th anniversary
- 1966: St. Mary's Catholic Church in Custer, Michigan
