= Custer Township, Mason County, Michigan =

Custer Township, Michigan
- Civil township
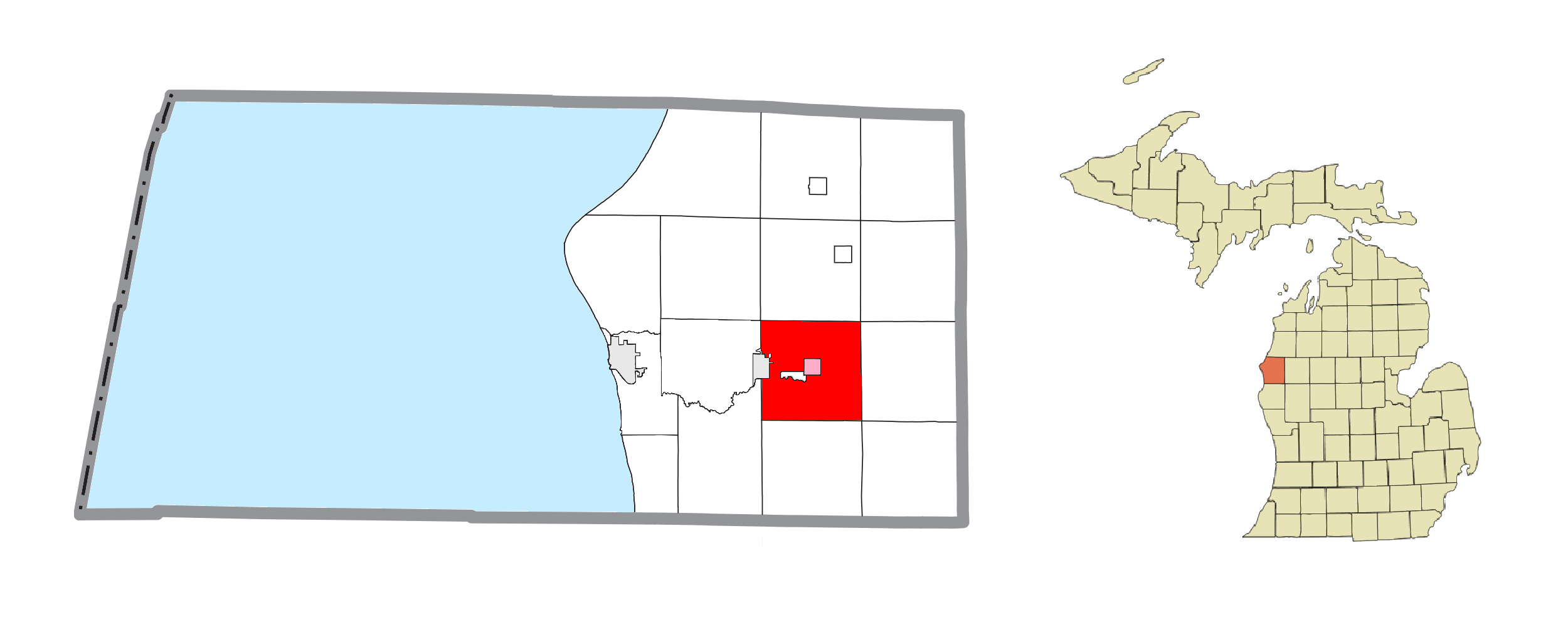
- Location within Mason County (red) and the administered village of Custer (pink)

- Location within Michigan Location within the United States
- Coordinates: 43°56′53″N 86°13′15″W
- Country: United States
- State: Michigan
- County: Mason

Government
  - Supervisor: Mark Anderson
  - Clerk: Ann Larr

Area
  - Total: 34.97 sq mi (90.6 km^{2})
  - Land: 34.91 sq mi (90.4 km^{2})
  - Water: 0.06 sq mi (0.16 km^{2})
- Elevation: 692 ft (211 m)

Population (2020)
  - Total: 1,321
  - Density: 37.8/sq mi (14.6/km^{2})
- Time zone: UTC-5 (Eastern (EST))
  - Summer (DST): UTC-4 (EDT)
- ZIP Codes: 49405 (Custer); 49454 (Scottville)
- Area code: 231
- FIPS code: 26-105-19440
- GNIS feature ID: 1626152
- Website: custertownship.com

Custer Township is a civil township of Mason County in the U.S. state of Michigan. The population was 1,321 at the 2020 census. The village of Custer is located within the township.

The township was named for George Armstrong Custer, a United States Army officer.

== Geography ==
The township is in central Mason County and is bordered to the west partially by the city of Scottville. The village of Custer is in the center of the township. According to the United States Census Bureau, the township has a total area of 34.97 square miles (90.57 km^{2}), of which 34.91 square miles (90.42 km^{2}) are land and 0.06 square miles (0.16 km^{2}), or 0.16%, are water. The Pere Marquette River flows east to west across the township, passing south of Custer village. U.S. Route 10 crosses the township from east to west as well, passing through the north side of the village.

== Demographics ==
As of the census of 2000, there were 1,307 people, 489 households, and 370 families residing in the township. The population density was 37.4 inhabitants per square mile (14.4/km^{2}). There were 550 housing units at an average density of 15.7 per square mile (6.1/km^{2}). The racial makeup of the township was 95.10% White, 0.31% African American, 1.45% Native American, 0.31% Asian, 1.07% from other races, and 1.76% from two or more races. Hispanic or Latino of any race were 3.14% of the population.

There were 489 households, out of which 33.9% had children under the age of 18 living with them, 64.8% were married couples living together, 8.0% had a female householder with no husband present, and 24.3% were non-families. 20.7% of all households were made up of individuals, and 10.0% had someone living alone who was 65 years of age or older. The average household size was 2.63, and the average family size was 3.02.

In the township the population was spread out, with 25.7% under the age of 18, 7.3% from 18 to 24, 26.7% from 25 to 44, 26.2% from 45 to 64, and 14.0% who were 65 years of age or older. The median age was 39 years. For every 100 females, there were 98.3 males. For every 100 females age 18 and over, there were 95.4 males.

The median income for a household in the township was $36,597, and the median income for a family was $40,625. Males had a median income of $32,143 versus $23,625 for females. The per capita income for the township was $17,407. About 9.1% of families and 9.8% of the population were below the poverty line, including 12.6% of those under age 18, and 6.4% of those age 65 or over.
