= Not-A-Pe-Ka-Gon Site =

Archaeological site in Michigan, United States

- U.S. National Register of Historic Places
- Michigan State Historic Site
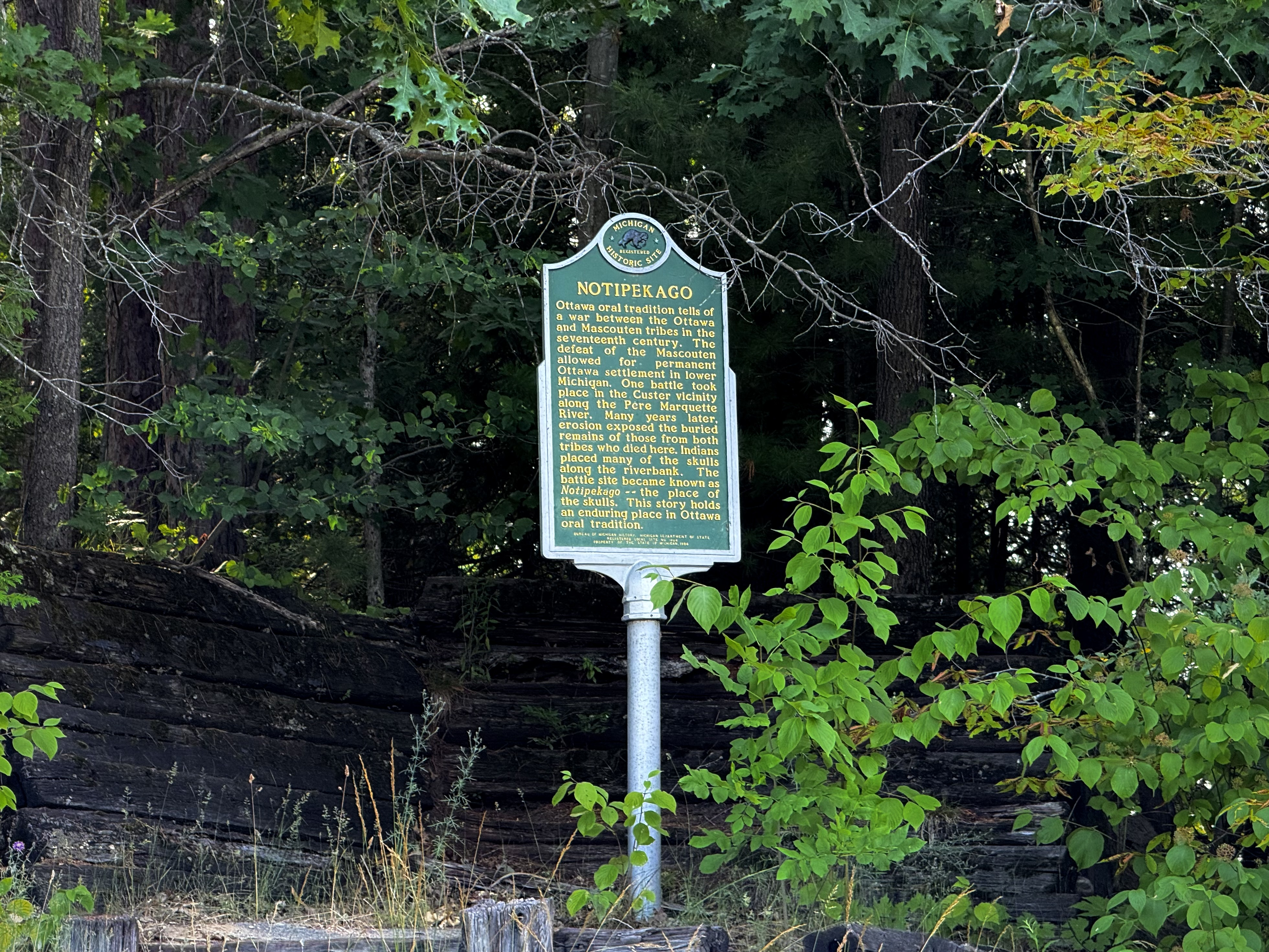
- A marker placed by the State of Michigan at the site

- Location within Michigan Location within the United States
- Location: near S Custer Road and the Pere Marquette R
- Nearest city: Custer, Michigan
- Coordinates: 43°56′10″N 86°13′12″W
- Area: 1 acre (0.40 ha)
- NRHP reference No.: 73002155

Significant dates
- Added to NRHP: July 27, 1973
- Designated MSHS: November 18, 1993

The Not-A-Pe-Ka-Gon Site or Notipekago Site, also known as the Quick Site, is a multi-component archaeological site at the site of where Mascouten were attacked by the Odawa, located near where South Custer Road crosses the Pere Marquette River in Mason County, Michigan. It was designated a Michigan State Historic Site in 1993 and listed on the National Register of Historic Places in 1973.

== History ==
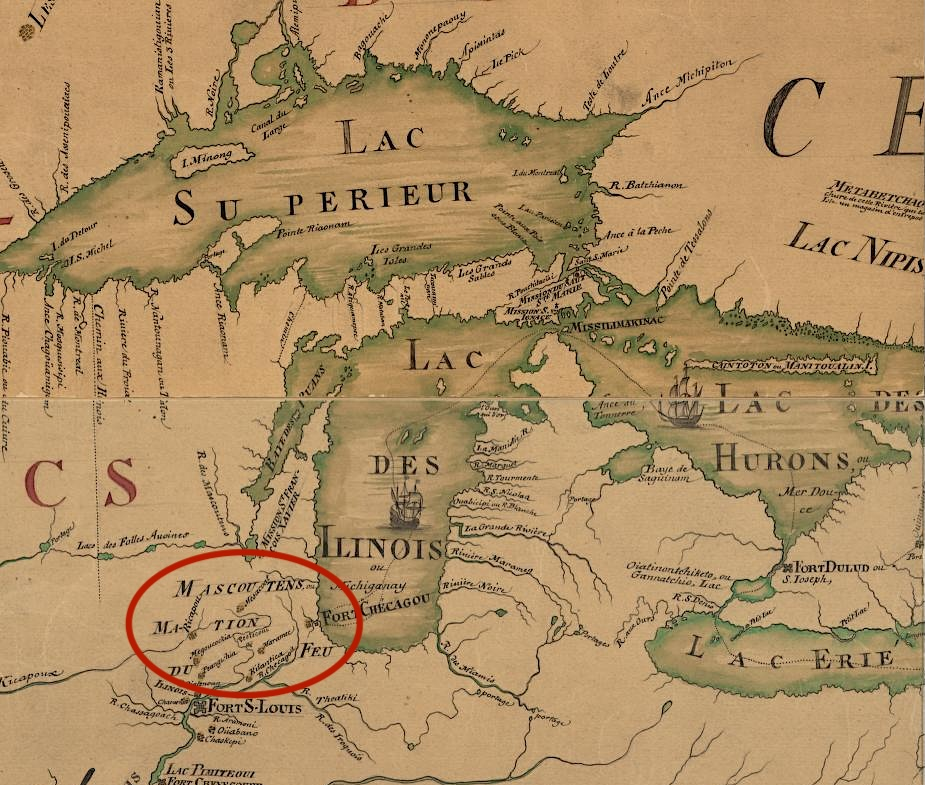
The location of the Mascouten, who were west of Lake Michigan prior to their expulsion in the 17th century

According to the Grand Rapids Press, the Mascouten people were recognized as being peaceful according to historic records. Conflicts between European settlers and indigenous Americans during the European colonization of the Americas led to conflicts in what is now Wisconsin, where the Mascouten were originally located before fleeing south to modern day Illinois and east to Michigan after being expelled by the Sioux. The Potawatomi, located in the southern Lower Peninsula of Michigan, granted the Mascouten passage north. The Odawa, who had then recently moved from the Upper Peninsula of Michigan and settled in the northern part of the Lower Peninsula of Michigan near the Straits of Mackinac, began to settle further south. The Odawa gave refuge to the Mascouten, allowing them to settle between what is now Baldwin, Michigan and Reed City, Michigan. The Mascouten traded their crops to the Odawa, who provided flint, bison hide and protection in return.

Oral stories later documented stated that between the mid-1600s and early-1700s, the Potawatomi became suspicious of the relationship between the Mascouten and Odawa, with a conflict beginning when some Potawatomi killed a group of Odawa on the coast of Lake Michigan during a false flag attack. The Potawatomi blamed the deaths on the Mascouten, leading to the Odawa crafting plans for the period of about one year to organize 2,000 warriors to exterminate the Mascouten. The Mascouten learned of the planned attack and sent runners to the Iroquois asking for assistance; only the Mohawk people offered refuge in their territory in what is now New York. Evacuation plans by the Mascouten included a fleet of canoes heading west down the Pere Marquette River into Lake Michigan, then a further journey down the lake's coast until reaching the mouth of the Grand River, where the Mascouten would head as far east as possible up the river before finally crossing into what is now Canada near Detroit towards their final destination in Mohawk territory. The Odawa were informed by spies about the Mascouten's evacuation plans.

In total, about 3,000 Mascouten – 1,000 men and 2,000 women, children and elderly – began to flee down the Pere Marquette River. As the Mascouten were between modern day Scottville, Michigan and Ludington, Michigan, Odawa warriors ambushed the Mascouten at a part of the river that was marsh-like and difficult to navigate. The Odawa attack lasted for up to four days in the area. Some Mascouten attempted to hide in brush alongside the marsh, leading to the Odawa burning vegetation along the banks of the river. A final battle occurred on edges of the river near Custer, Michigan leaving behind archaeological evidence. Over a period of weeks, the Odawa killed any remaining Mascouten women and children they encountered. The attack was so severe that oral stories documented the river being red from blood and that only about one dozen of the 3,000 Mascouten survived the journey to the Mohawk Valley. According to Mark Dougher, a former director of the Little River Band of Ottawa Indians, "Essentially, [the] displacing of the Mascoutens from the territory ... opened up that area for Ottawa settlement." The skulls of dead Mascouten were placed on sticks along the riverbank; the site became known as "Notipekago" or "Notipekagon" – literally, "heads on sticks."

When the settler Burr Caswell established himself in the area in 1847, he said that Native Americans in the area called the river "Not-a-pe-ka-gon". Burial mounds were removed from the southern part of the S Custer Road bridge and from where the cemetery is located near Custer. Years later, erosion exposed the previously buried remains of the warriors, leading to the modern archaeological discovery of the site.

== Description ==
The Not-A-Pe-Ka-Gon Site is located on two river terraces along the Pere Marquette River. The site contains three small mounds; pottery and French trade goods were found in the area.
