= Custer, Michigan =

- Village
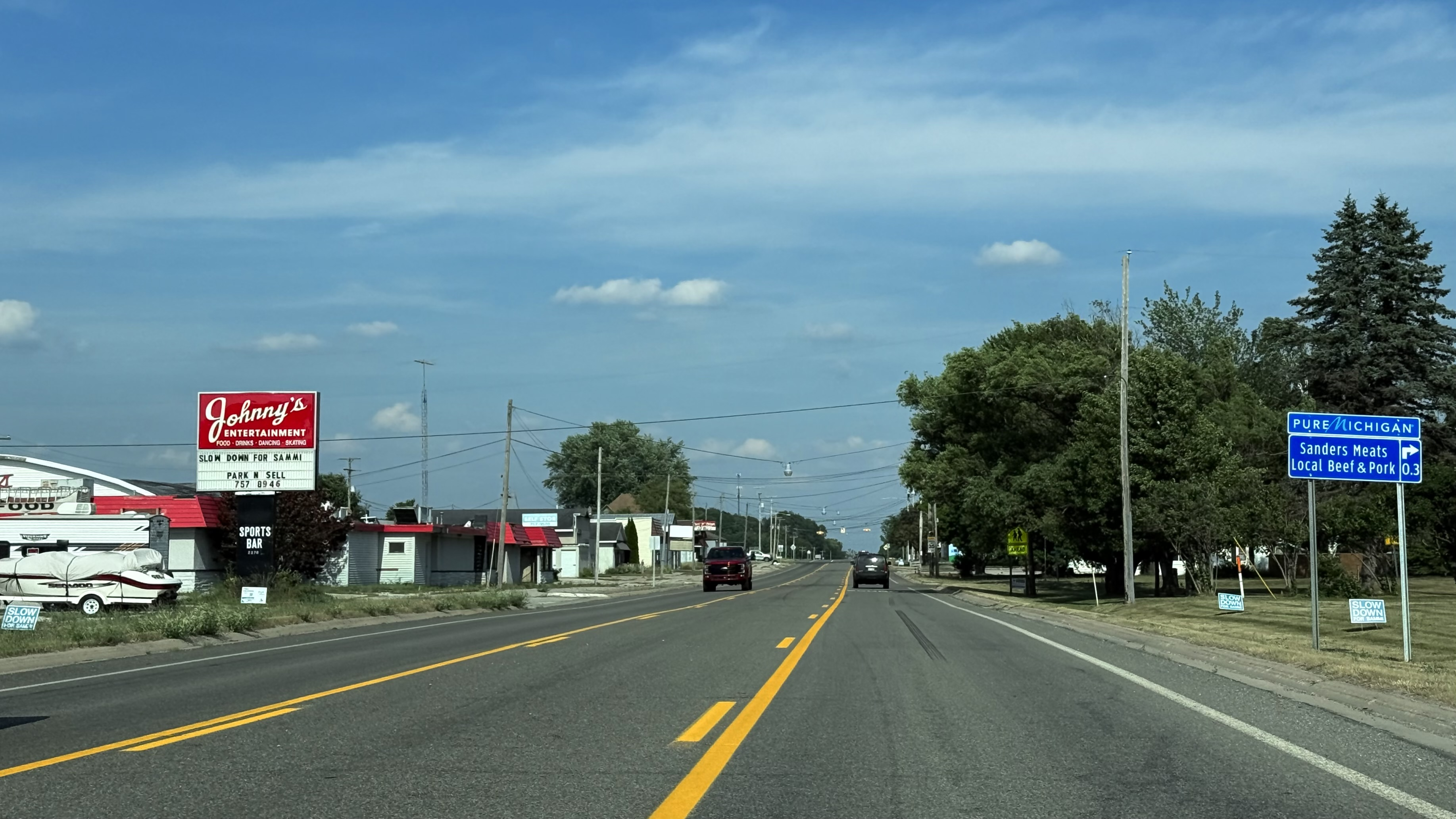
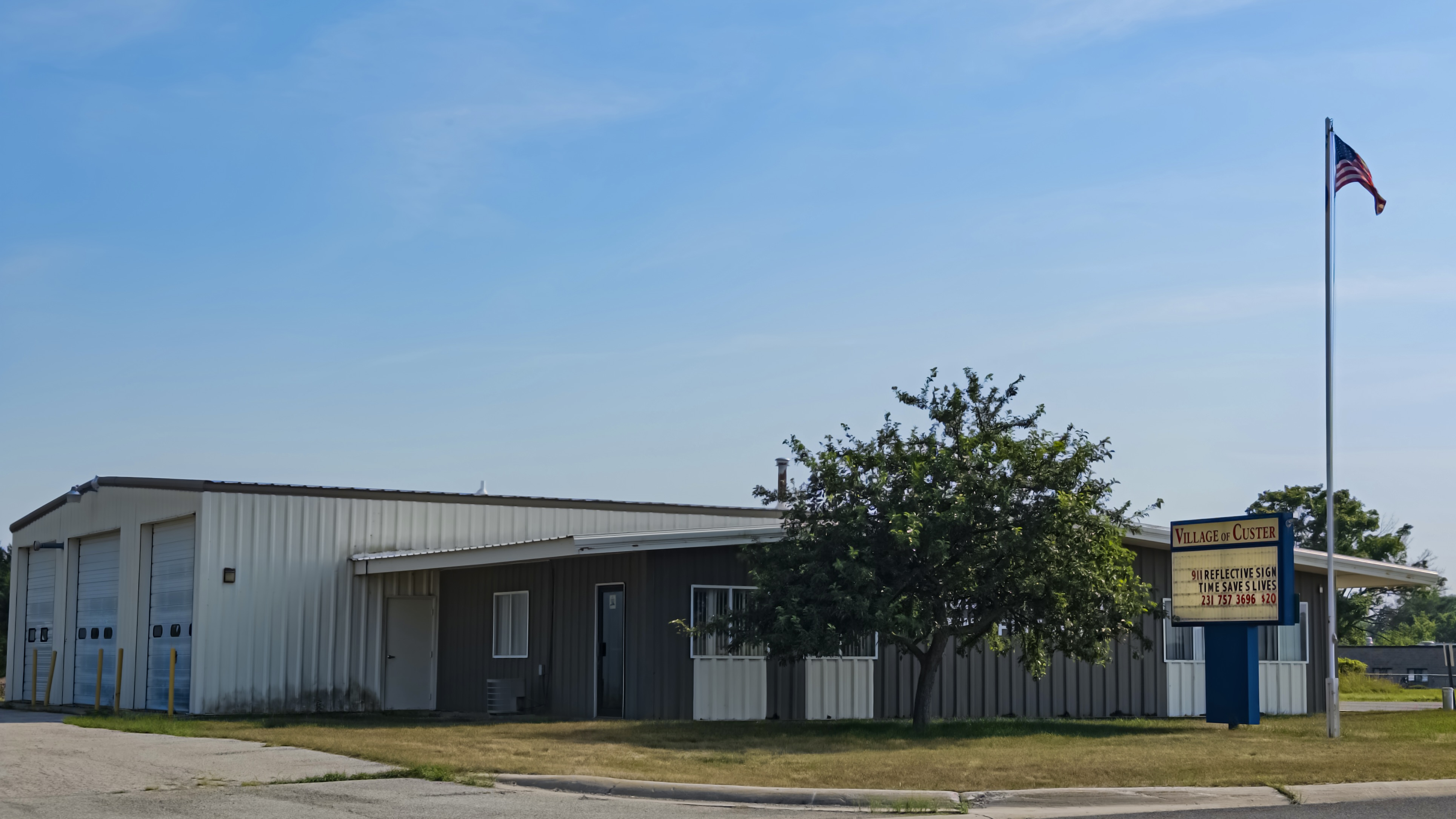
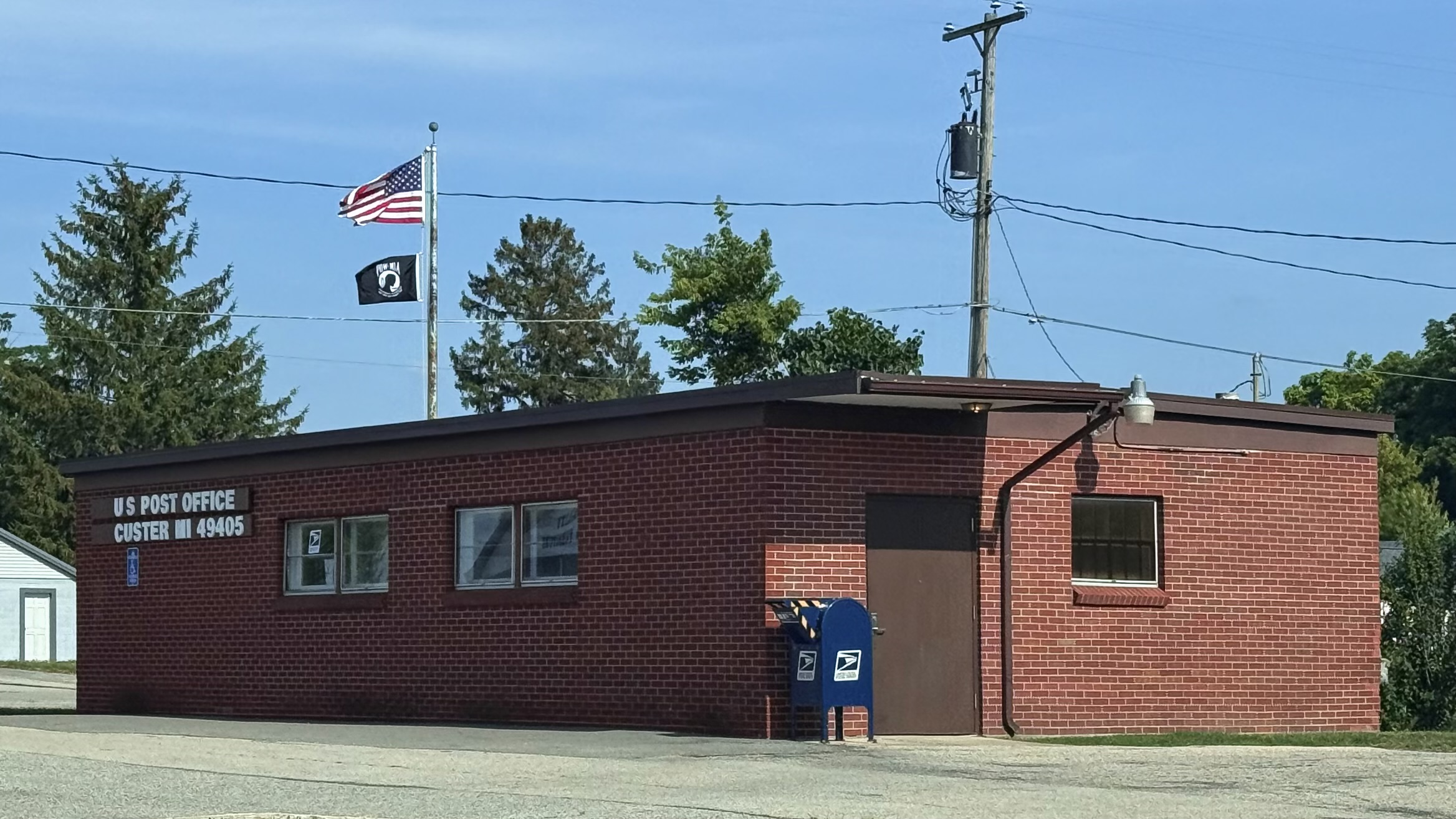
- U.S. Route 10 in Custer Village hall Post office

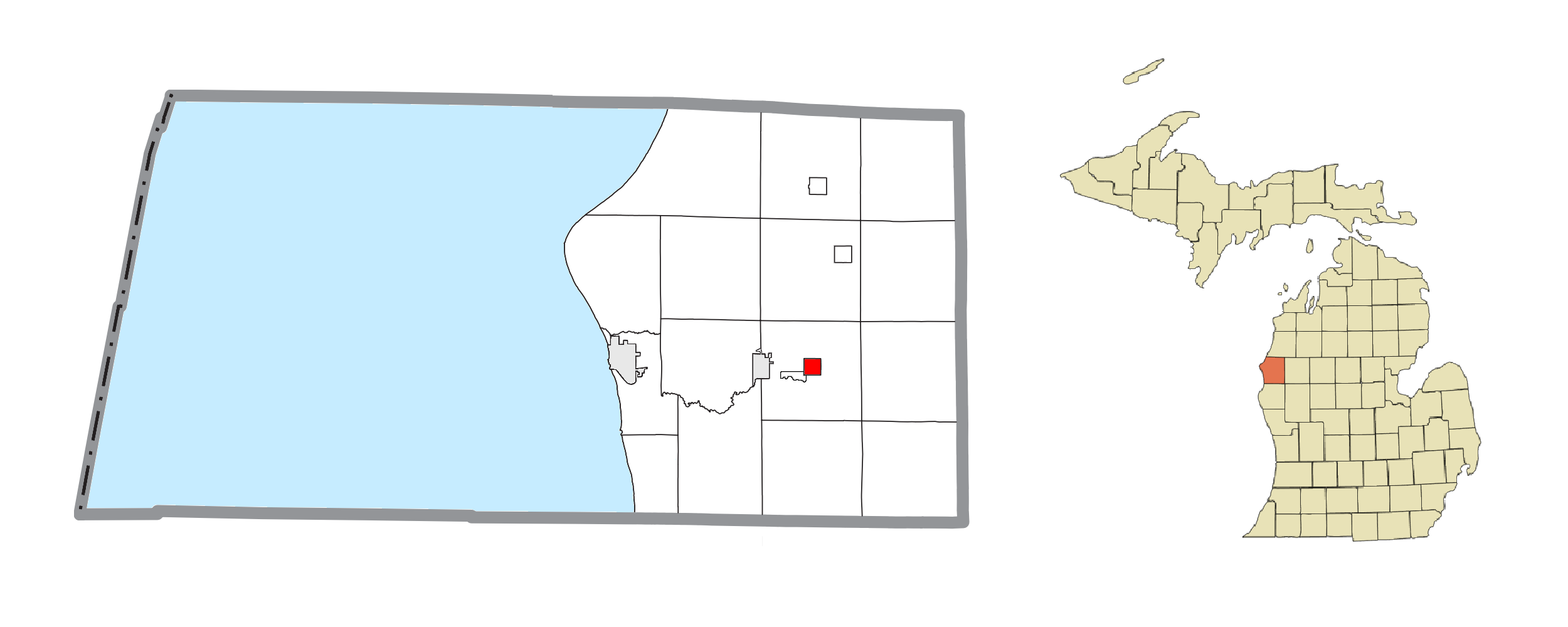
- Location within Mason County

- Location within Michigan Location within the United States
- Coordinates: 43°57′01″N 86°13′10″W
- Country: United States
- State: Michigan
- County: Mason
- Township: Custer
- Platted: 1878
- Incorporated: 1895

Area
  - Total: 1.07 sq mi (2.76 km^{2})
  - Land: 1.07 sq mi (2.76 km^{2})
  - Water: 0 sq mi (0.00 km^{2})
- Elevation: 676 ft (206 m)

Population (2020)
  - Total: 272
  - Density: 255.7/sq mi (98.72/km^{2})
- Time zone: UTC-5 (Eastern (EST))
  - Summer (DST): UTC-4 (EDT)
- ZIP Code: 49405
- Area code: 231
- FIPS code: 26-19420
- GNIS feature ID: 1619649
- Website: www.villageofcuster.org

Custer is a village in Mason County in the U.S. state of Michigan. The population was 272 at the 2020 census. The village is located within Custer Township.

== History ==
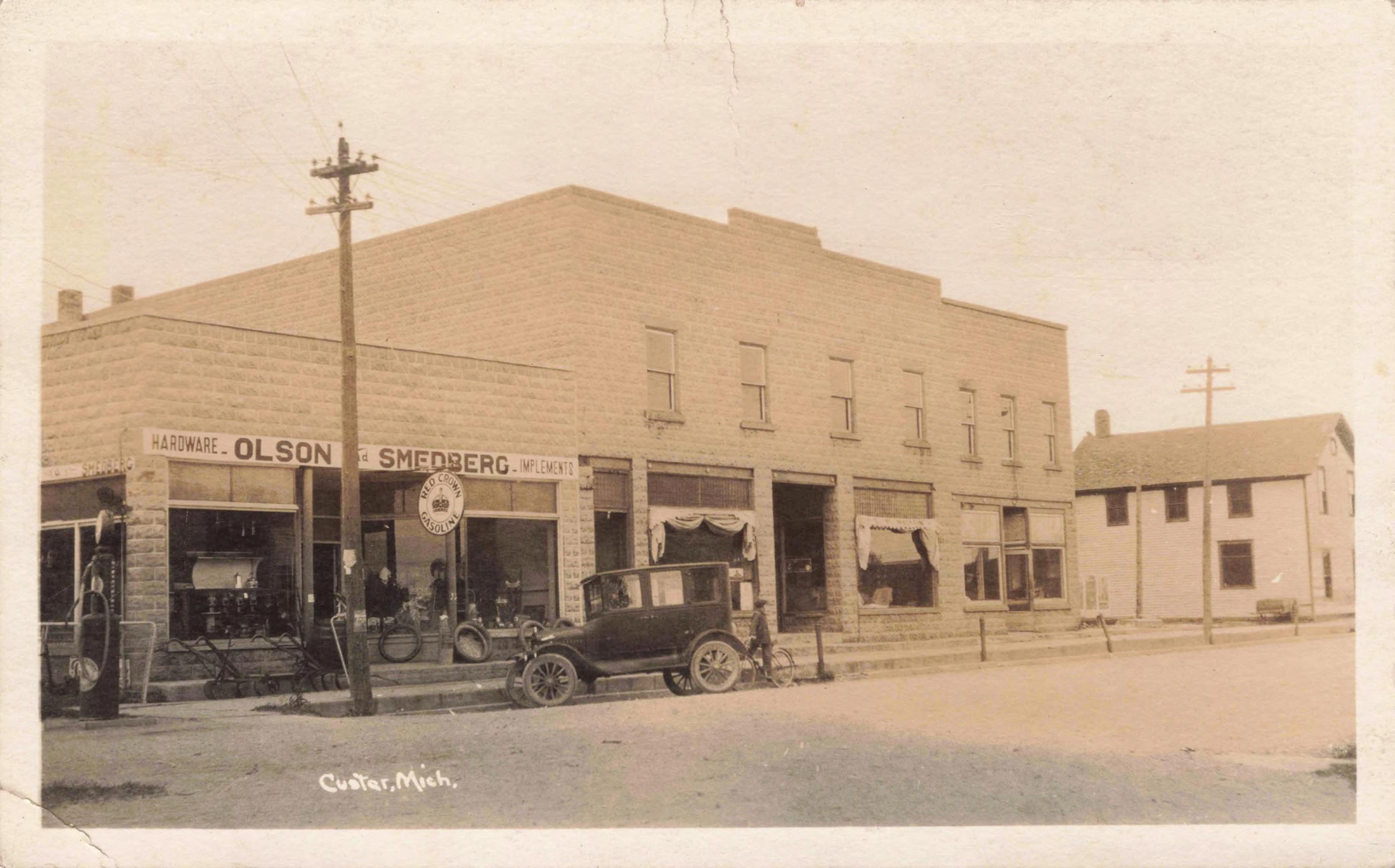
Custer in 1925

Prior to European settlers arriving in the area, Native Americans lived near what is now Custer, with a location just south of the city being the site of a battle between the Mascouten and Odawa on the Pere Marquette River. At the site, known as the Not-A-Pe-Ka-Gon Site, thousands of Mascouten were killed by the Odawa and their heads were placed on sticks, giving the river its original name, "Notipekago" or "Notipekagon", meaning "heads on sticks" in English.

The United States created an Indian reservation where Custer is located in 1855. Custer was platted in 1878 and incorporated as a village in 1895. The village was named for George Armstrong Custer.

A community of Lithuanians began to settle in the village around 1912 and following World War I, the community grew further.

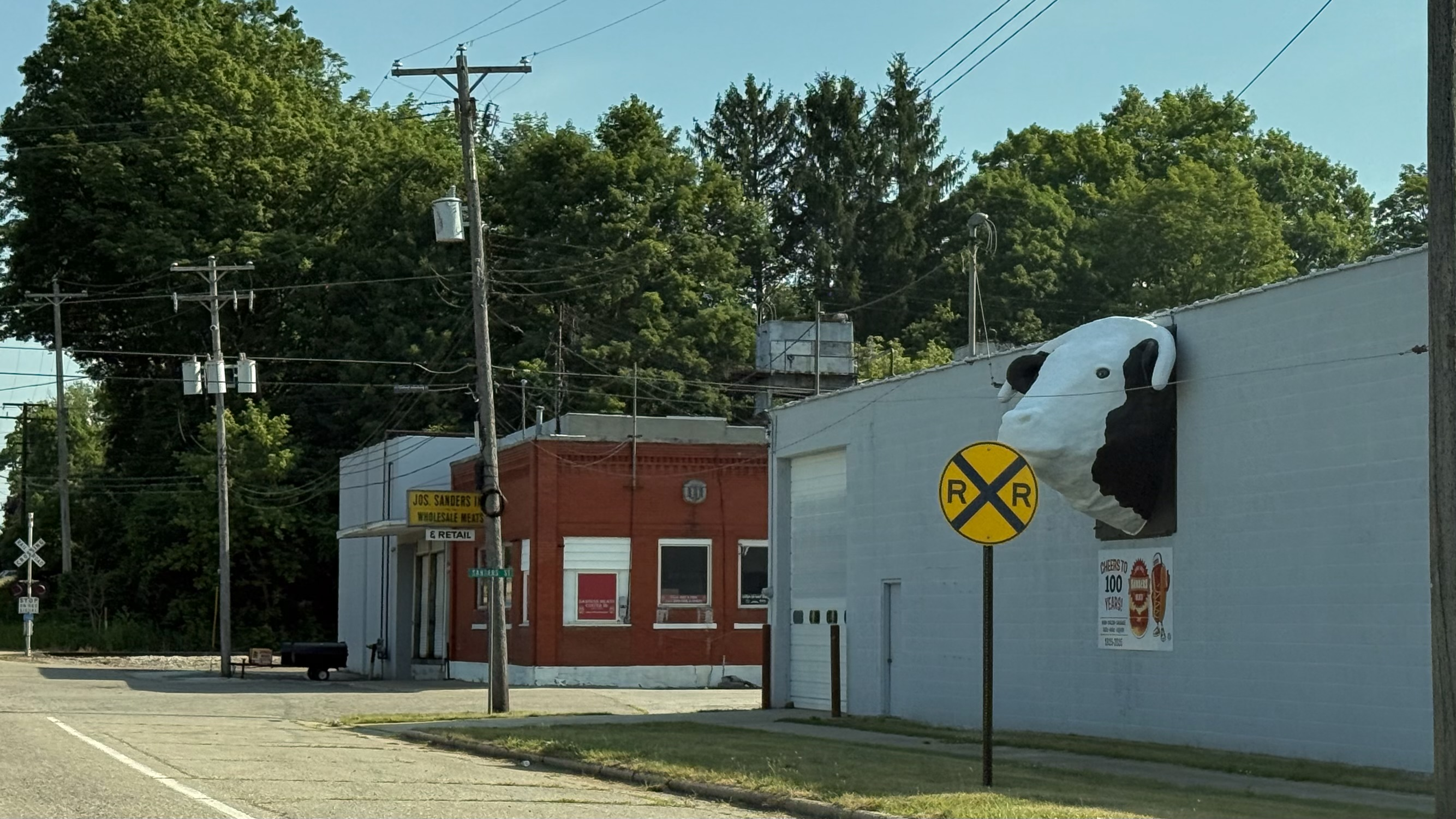
Sanders Meats

In 1925, Joseph T. Sanders founded Sanders Meats in Custer, delivering meat products to customers in his Ford Model T. Sanders Meats passed through four generations of the Sanders family, eventually expanding to provide products to businesses and restaurants ranging up to 100 miles (160 km) away.

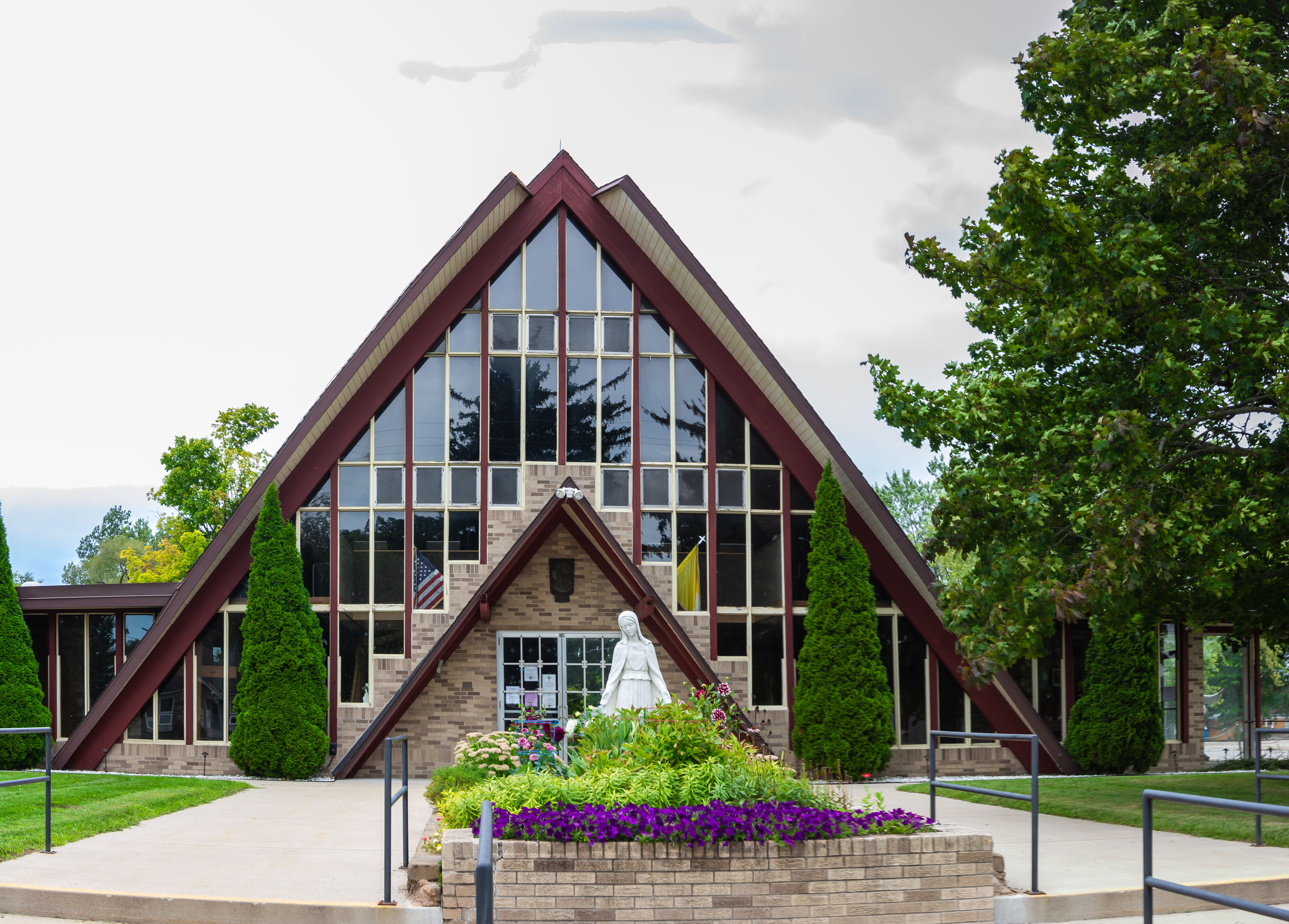
St. Mary's Catholic Church, designed by Jonas Mulokas

St. Mary's Catholic Church was established in 1933. In 1966, St. Mary's opened its new church, which was designed by architect Jonas Mulokas and shared architectural elements with the award-winning design of the Transfiguration Catholic Church in Queens, New York.

== Geography ==
Custer is in central Mason County, 3 miles (5 km) east of Scottville and 11 miles (18 km) east of Ludington, the county seat. According to the U.S. Census Bureau, the village has a total area of 1.06 square miles (2.75 km^{2}), all land.

== Demographics ==
Historical population
Census	Pop.	Note	%±
1900	269		—
1910	277		3.0%
1920	269		−2.9%
1930	281		4.5%
1940	237		−15.7%
1950	260		9.7%
1960	365		40.4%
1970	320		−12.3%
1980	341		6.6%
1990	312		−8.5%
2000	318		1.9%
2010	284		−10.7%
2020	272		−4.2%
U.S. Decennial Census

=== 2010 census ===
As of the census of 2010, there were 285 people, 110 households, and 72 families residing in the village. The population density was 286.9 inhabitants per square mile (110.8/km^{2}). There were 137 housing units at an average density of 138.4 per square mile (53.4/km^{2}). The racial makeup of the village was 97.2% White, 0.7% African American, 0.4% Native American, and 1.8% from two or more races. Hispanic or Latino of any race were 3.9% of the population.

There were 110 households, of which 30.9% had children under the age of 18 living with them, 44.5% were married couples living together, 12.7% had a female householder with no husband present, 8.2% had a male householder with no wife present, and 34.5% were non-families. 26.4% of all households were made up of individuals, and 7.3% had someone living alone who was 65 years of age or older. The average household size was 2.58 and the average family size was 3.06.

The median age in the village was 39 years. 23.6% of residents were under the age of 18; 10.9% were between the ages of 18 and 24; 20.7% were from 25 to 44; 28.1% were from 45 to 64; and 16.5% were 65 years of age or older. The gender makeup of the village was 51.4% male and 48.6% female.

=== 2000 census ===
As of the census of 2000, there were 318 people, 117 households, and 91 families residing in the village. The population density was 320.7 inhabitants per square mile (123.8/km^{2}). There were 132 housing units at an average density of 133.1 per square mile (51.4/km^{2}). The racial makeup of the village was 90.88% White, 2.20% Native American, 0.31% Asian, 3.46% from other races, and 3.14% from two or more races. Hispanic or Latino of any race were 3.46% of the population.

There were 117 households, out of which 35.9% had children under the age of 18 living with them, 56.4% were married couples living together, 17.9% had a female householder with no husband present, and 22.2% were non-families. 19.7% of all households were made up of individuals, and 9.4% had someone living alone who was 65 years of age or older. The average household size was 2.66 and the average family size was 3.04.

In the village, the population was spread out, with 28.9% under the age of 18, 9.1% from 18 to 24, 21.4% from 25 to 44, 24.5% from 45 to 64, and 16.0% who were 65 years of age or older. The median age was 37 years. For every 100 females, there were 100.0 males. For every 100 females age 18 and over, there were 86.8 males.

The median income for a household in the village was $29,444, and the median income for a family was $35,625. Males had a median income of $29,375 versus $20,536 for females. The per capita income for the village was $15,436. About 11.1% of families and 10.1% of the population were below the poverty line, including 15.5% of those under age 18 and 4.4% of those age 65 or over.

== Climate ==
This climatic region is typified by large seasonal temperature differences, with warm to hot (and often humid) summers and cold (sometimes severely cold) winters. According to the Köppen Climate Classification system, Custer has a humid continental climate, abbreviated "Dfb" on climate maps.
