= WSCC =

WSCC may refer to:

== Radio stations ==
- WSCC-FM, a radio station (94.3 FM) licensed to Goose Creek, South Carolina, United States
- WLTQ (AM), a radio station (730 AM) licensed to Charleston, South Carolina, United States and formerly called WSCC

== Community colleges ==
- Washington State Community College, a two-year college in Marietta, Ohio, United States
- Walters State Community College, a community college in Morristown, Tennessee, United States
- West Somerset Community College, a comprehensive school located in Minehead, Somerset, England
- West Shore Community College, a community college with its main campus in Mason County, Michigan, United States
- Wallace State Community College, a community college located in Hanceville, Alabama, United States

== Other uses ==
- Washington State Convention Center, in Seattle, Washington, United States
- West Sussex County Council, the authority governing West Sussex, England
- World Sportscar Championship, the world series run for sports car racing by the FIA from 1953 to 1992
- White Shepherd Club of Canada, a club for fanciers of the White Shepherd Dog
- Western Systems Coordinating Council, a North American regional electric reliability council merged in 2002 with the Western Electricity Coordinating Council
