= WPAL =

WPAL may refer to:

- WQOR (FM), a radio station (90.5 FM) licensed to serve Laceyville, Pennsylvania, United States, which held the call sign WPAL from 2017 to 2023; see List of radio stations in Pennsylvania
- WCOZ (FM), a radio station (91.7 FM) licensed to serve New Albany, Pennsylvania, which held the call sign WPAL from 2011 to 2017
- WLTQ (AM) (formerly WPAL), an AM radio station once located in Charleston, South Carolina
- WAYA-FM (formerly WPAL-FM), an FM radio station licensed to Ridgeville, South Carolina
- Wikipedia:WikiProject Alabama
