= Scottville Public Library =

- 43.9546°N 86.2779°W
- Location: Scottville, Michigan
- Established: 1956
- Branch of: Mason County District Library

Collection
- Size: 35,000 volumes

Access and use
- Circulation: 75,000
- Population served: 28,800

Other information
- Director: Eric Smith - District Director; Ingrid Fournier - Branch Manager
- Website: www.masoncounty.lib.mi.us

The Scottville Public Library is a branch or division of the Mason County District Library administrative board. The first librarian was Ruth VanderMolen. The second librarian was Robert Dickson. The third and current director is Eric Smith, with Ingrid Fournier serving as Branch Manager.

== History ==
The Scottville Public Library has its roots from 1899 when a retired local banker, Charles Blain, donated a lot for the library on South Main Street in Scottville. Money to construct a building for use on that lot was raised by hosting public fund-raising events and by starting a subscription service. The first building which stood in the lot was the Blain Reading Association, named after Charles Blain.

The library existed in this location until 1940 when it was sold and a new building was constructed. The library shared this new building with another company, and at the time was situated on the second floor.
