= WLTQ =

WLTQ may refer to:

- WLTQ (AM), a radio station (730 AM) licensed to serve Charleston, South Carolina, United States
- WRUB (FM), a radio station (106.5 FM) licensed to serve Sarasota, Florida, which held the call sign WLTQ-FM in 2016
- WCTQ, a radio station (92.1 FM) licensed to serve Venice, Florida, United States, which held the call sign WLTQ-FM from 2005 to 2016
