= WCOZ =

WCOZ may refer to:

- WCOZ (FM), a radio station (91.7 FM) licensed to serve New Albany, Pennsylvania, United States
- WQOR (FM), a radio station (90.5 FM) licensed to serve Laceyville, Pennsylvania, which held the call sign WCOZ from 2008 to 2017; see List of radio stations in Pennsylvania
- WGMF-FM, a radio station (103.9 FM) licensed to serve Dushore, Pennsylvania, which held the call sign WCOZ from 2003 to 2008
- WZLX, a radio station (100.7 FM) licensed to serve Boston, Massachusetts, which held the call sign WCOZ from 1984 to 1985
- WJMN (FM), a radio station (94.5 FM) licensed to serve Boston, Massachusetts, which held the call sign WCOZ from 1972 to 1984
