= W. Stanley Proctor =

American painter and sculptor in Florida (born 1939)

- Born: December 12, 1939 (age 86); Tallahassee, Florida
- Occupation: Sculptor

W. Stanley "Sandy" Proctor (born December 12, 1939) is an American painter and sculptor in Florida who makes bronze figures. He was inducted into the Florida Artists Hall of Fame in 2006.

In 2004 he received the National Sculpture Society's American Artists Professional League Award for a traditional realistic depiction in sculpture.

== Biography ==
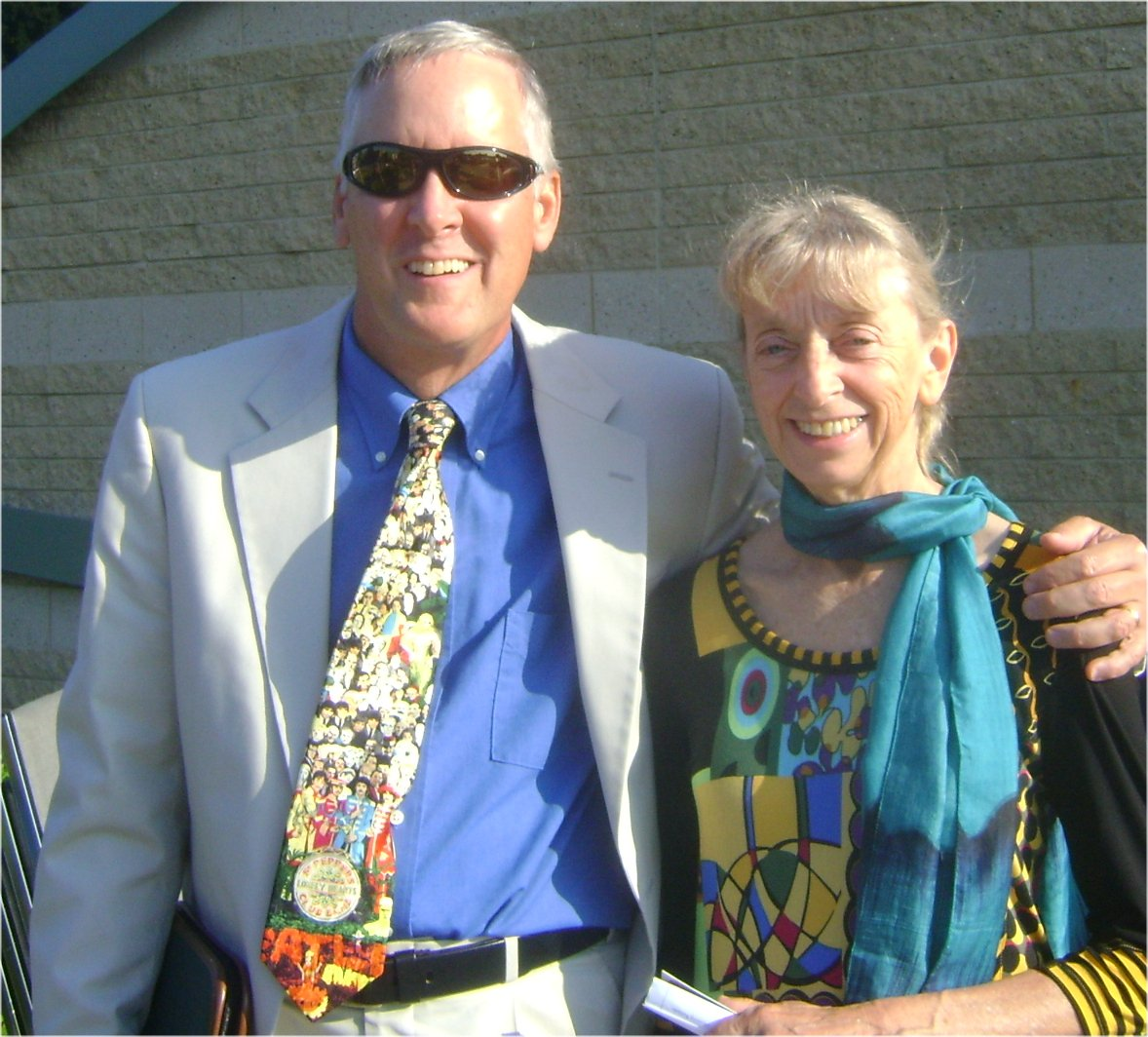
W. Stanley "Sandy" Proctor at the unveiling of the sculpture Double The Fun at the Ludington Public Library

Proctor was born on December 12, 1939, in Tallahassee, Florida. He attended Kate Sullivan Elementary School. Proctor's fifth grade teacher was an inspiration and motivation for his art work. He attended Leon High School in Tallahassee. After graduating from High School he attended Washington and Lee University in Virginia where he earned a bachelor's degree in history and worked three years in Washington, D.C., as a political aide. Proctor then worked in his family's fuel-oil business until 1981, when he then devoted full-time to his art career.

Proctor developed a hobby as a painter while a child, which progressed to more advanced paintings as a young man. He loved the outdoors, so he painted subjects like birds, flowers, trees, landscapes and wild animals. Proctor's hobby eventually evolved into a career as people showed interest in his work. His paintings were selected for exhibition in many juried shows by a panel of peers. Among those were displays at the Leigh Yawkey Birds in Art, Southern Watercolor Society Show, and the Florida Watercolor Society Show.

Proctor transitioned his art work into sculptures of clay. Later he progressed to working in alabaster and marble. His wife's and family's support helped ease his transition into three dimensional art work. He perfected the use of a Styrofoam armature and became proficient at depicting people and their unique traits, characteristics and personalities. Proctor's work lead to making bronze sculptures portraying moments in life, which he is best known for. His works are displayed at the Smithsonian Museum, the British Museum of Natural History, and the Cleveland Museum of Natural History.

In 2004 Proctor's work Seychelles was selected as the American Artists Professional League Award recipient from the National Sculpture Society 71st Annual Awards Exhibition for work best depicting traditional realism.

== Public sculpture ==
Proctor did a work for the Veteran's Memorial Park in Cupertino, California, called The Guardians. One of the first sculptured memorials to those who served in the War in Afghanistan, and the only one directly pertaining to Operation Red Wings. it is a large sculpture of two Navy SEALs killed in the line of duty in Afghanistan in 2005. In November 2007, it was dedicated by Secretary of the Navy Donald Winter. The sculpture depicts Matthew Axelson and James Suh in full combat equipment. The event inspired the war movie Lone Survivor. Proctor offered his opinion to the Tallahassee Democrat that it is "my best work yet". Because of his scrupulous devotion to realistic depictions of humans, Proctor was the personal choice of Axelson's family for the project, and they made that recommendation to the committee.

His work is diverse in subject and location and critically recognized, such as his sculpture titled "Sharing Sunshine" which is located at the Denver Health Medical Center. Additional sculptures of his are also in collections at the Boyds Collection in Pennsylvania, the Colorado National Jewish Center Hospital; the Living Desert Museum in California; depiction of children playing in the Florida Governor's Mansion Children's Park, cast from a clay work; Hackensack University Medical Center and the Leon County Courthouse. He has done pieces for Bank of America, the Leigh Yawkey Woodson Art Museum, the Florida Polk Museum of Art, and the Living Desert Museum in California. The Leigh Yawkey Woodson "Wildlife: The Artist's View" show and traveling exhibit of 1993 included Proctor's alabaster sculpture of the endangered manatee. A bronze manatee sculpture of his is in the atrium of the Tallahassee Memorial Hospital. Proctor's works cost from several thousand dollars for small busts or birds to a $100,000 or more for larger pieces.

The Governor of Florida Lawton Chiles presented President Bill Clinton a Proctor work entitled "Bandanna" in 1995, a work permanently displayed in the White House in the Roosevelt Room. Proctor has made a six-person life-size sculpture for the Florida Sheriff's Fallen Officer Memorial; a six-person Tug-of-War sculpture for Raymond James Financial Art Collection; a five-person sculpture for the University of South Alabama; a three-person sculpture for the Florida State Highway Patrol Memorial; and a two-person sculpture for the Florida Sheriff's Boys Ranch. A sculpture after one of his designs was cast and installed at a library in Clear Lake, Iowa. In about 2004 his Poppies, World War II Veterans Memorial was dedicated in Edmond, Oklahoma.

The Tallahassee Democrat newspaper reported in their "Life & Arts" section of a 2006 Sunday edition that Proctor likely is the most viewed artist in Tallahassee because of the many life-size statues throughout the city. First Lady of the State of Florida commissioned Proctor's sculpture Follow the Leader to be displayed just outside the Florida governor's office window so that all future governors would see children playing, as a reminder that they are the future and the reason for a government. He has nearly a dozen public sculptures on display in and around Tallahassee, and his home town connection is a source of local pride. His citation for inclusion in the Florida Artists Hall of Fame said: "The remarkable vision and works of Sandy Proctor demonstrate a powerful lifelong commitment to Florida's rich heritage... Sandy Proctor has devoted his life and work towards creating a more pleasing and inspirational environment for the citizens of Florida."

Starting in the twenty-first century he is well known for creating sculptures of famous sports figures — a variation of sports iconography — including a nine-foot bronze sculpture of Florida State University's head football coach Bobby Bowden that was dedicated at Doak Campbell Stadium in 2004. Proctor also made a life-size statue of baseball player Eddie Stanky. He has also created larger-than-life sculptures of Heisman Trophy-winning quarterbacks football players Danny Wuerffel, Tim Tebow and Steve Spurrier. After some controversy as to their timing, they were installed and put into place at the University of Florida with a dedication at the Ben Hill Griffin Stadium on April 9, 2011. The commission for the three statues was $550,000.

Proctor's sculpture "Integration: Books, Bats and Beauty" features a group of three nine-foot figures near Florida State University Student Union. It represents the university's first black students that laid a path for integration. (Note: "The statue, created by renowned sculptor W. Stanley 'Sandy' Proctor" realistically depicts Maxwell Courtney, Fred Flowers and Doby Flowers. Respectively, they are the first African Americans at Florida State University to: graduate from FSU; don an FSU athletic uniform; and be chosen homecoming princess. See History of Florida State University.)

In 2009 Pursuit—featuring three over-sized soccer players that "epitomize the Gopher Sport mission statement"—was dedicated at Owatonna, Minnesota.

In 2014, "Double the Fun" was installed in the Craig R. Rasmussen Outdoor Activity Area of the Ludington Public Library, and the sculptor attended the dedication.

== Other works ==
He created the design for the Wuerffel Trophy, which commemorates Danny Wuerffel "as he prays after a touchdown". It is awarded annually by the All Sports Association of Fort Walton Beach, Florida to the athlete who best exemplifies Wuerffel's character on the field of play and in the classroom.

=== Works in Ludington, Michigan ===
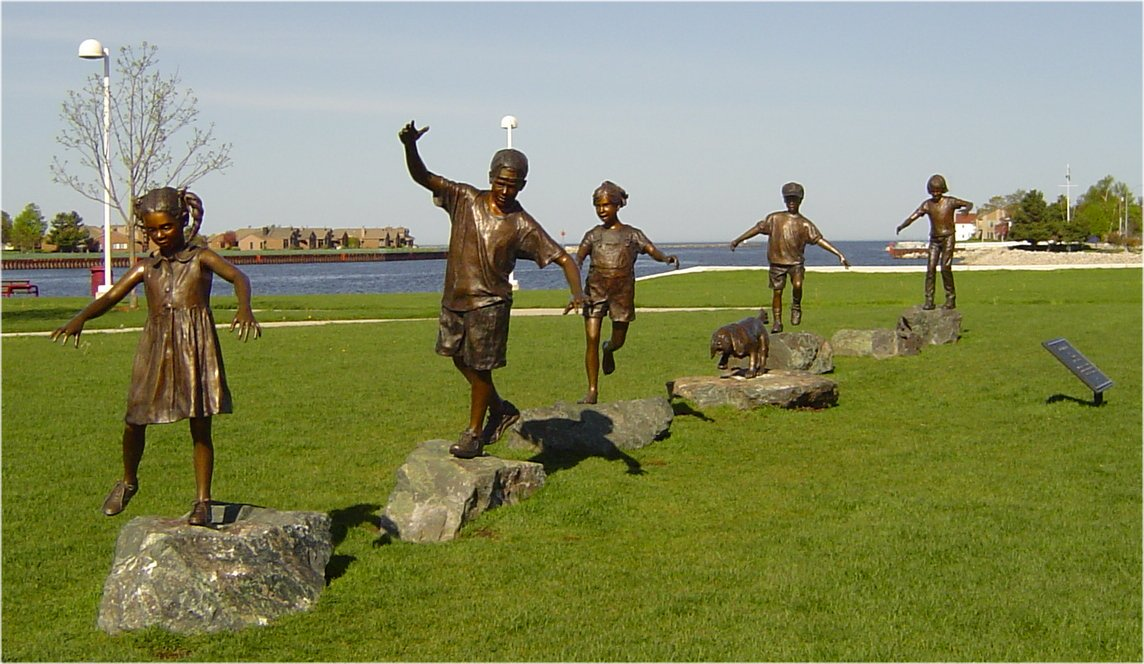
"Follow the Leader" 2002, the Ludington harbor front

== Family ==
Proctor is married to Melinda; two of their children help manage the business. As of 2014 he lived in Tallahassee, Florida.
