= WEZL =

- Charleston, South Carolina; United States
- Broadcast area: Charleston metro area; South Carolina Lowcountry
- Frequency: 103.5 MHz (HD Radio)
- Branding: 103.5 WEZL

Programming
- Format: Country
- Affiliations: Premiere Networks

Ownership
- Owner: iHeartMedia, Inc.; (iHM Licenses, LLC)
- Sister stations: WRFQ, WSCC-FM, WXLY

History
- First air date: October 5, 1970
- Call sign meaning: "Weasel"

Technical information
- Licensing authority: FCC
- Facility ID: 2441
- Class: C1
- ERP: 95,000 watts 100,000 with beam tilt
- HAAT: 201 meters (659 ft)
- Transmitter coordinates: 32°49′4.00″N 79°50′9.00″W

Links
- Public license information: Public file; LMS
- Webcast: Listen live (via iHeartRadio)
- Website: wezlfm.com

WEZL (103.5 FM) is a commercial radio station licensed to Charleston, South Carolina, United States, serving the Lowcountry. It features a country music format and is owned by iHeartMedia, Inc. The studios are located on Houston Northcutt Boulevard in Mount Pleasant.

The transmitter is sited off Venning Road in Mount Pleasant. WEZL also broadcasts in HD Radio.

== History ==
On October 5, 1970, WEZL first signed on the air. It was owned by the Fine Arts Broadcasting with studios on Church Street. In its early days, it had an effective radiated power of 25,900 watts. It started with an easy listening format, represented by the EZ in its call sign. After a couple of years, it flipped to country music. But it kept the same call letters, now pronouncing them as "Weasel."

The Weasel Morning Show consisted of longtime radio personalities TJ Phillips, Gary Griffin and Ric Rush. TJ, Gary and Ric were consistently the top rated morning show in Charleston. Griffin retired in 2012. Phillips and Rush continued as the morning hosts before being moved to afternoons to make way for the syndicated Bobby Bones Show airing weekday mornings from Nashville.

WEZL has been a country station in the Charleston market since 1972; 54 years ago. In 2007, it started competing with Citadel Broadcasting's country station, WIWF 96.9 FM. WIWF later switched to classic hits. Currently WEZL's country competition is 92.5 WCKN, owned by Saga Communications.

"The Weasel" had the number one morning show for years prior to the arrival of Mike Tyler in January 1999. Tyler, Griffin and Janet Walsh fell to number 5 but regained the top spot in Fall 1999. In the 2000s, the station stopped calling itself "The Weasel" most of the time, instead simply using its dial position and call letters.
