= WSCC-FM =

- Goose Creek, South Carolina; United States
- Broadcast area: Charleston metropolitan area/South Carolina Lowcountry
- Frequency: 94.3 MHz (HD Radio)
- Branding: News Radio 94.3 WSC

Programming
- Format: News/talk
- Subchannels: HD3: Contemporary Christian (WAYA-FM simulcast)
- Network: Fox News Radio
- Affiliations: Premiere Networks; Compass Media Networks

Ownership
- Owner: iHeartMedia, Inc.; (iHM Licenses, LLC)
- Sister stations: WEZL, WRFQ, WXLY

History
- First air date: May 19, 1983; 43 years ago
- Former call signs: WBJX (1983–1984); WLNB (1984–1987); WWHT-FM (1987–1990); WUJM (1990–1992); WSSP (1992–2004)
- Call sign meaning: W South Carolina Charleston

Technical information
- Licensing authority: FCC
- Facility ID: 31939
- Class: C3
- ERP: 25,000 watts
- HAAT: 100 meters (328 ft)
- Transmitter coordinates: 32°49′4.00″N 79°50′9.00″W

Links
- Public license information: Public file; LMS
- Webcast: Listen Live
- Website: 943wsc.com

WSCC-FM (94.3 MHz), also known as "News Radio 94.3 WSC", is a commercial radio station licensed to Goose Creek, South Carolina, and serving the Charleston metropolitan area. It airs a news/talk format and is owned by iHeartMedia, Inc. The station's studios and offices are on Houston Northcutt Boulevard in Mount Pleasant.

Weekdays begin with an information and interview show shared with WVOC Columbia, Gary David and South Carolina's Morning News. The rest of the schedule is nationally syndicated programs, mostly from co-owned Premiere Networks: The Clay Travis and Buck Sexton Show, The Glenn Beck Radio Program, The Sean Hannity Show, The Ramsey Show with Dave Ramsey, Ground Zero with Clyde Lewis, Coast to Coast AM with George Noory and This Morning, America's First News with Gordon Deal. Weekends feature shows on money, health, law, real estate, home repair and technology, some of which are paid brokered programming. Syndicated weekend programs include The Kim Komando Show, The Weekend with Michael Brown, The Ben Ferguson Show, Somewhere in Time with Art Bell and Sunday Nights with Bill Cunningham. Most hours begin with an update from Fox News Radio.

WSCC-FM has an effective radiated power (ERP) of 25,000 watts. The transmitter is on Venning Road in Mount Pleasant. WSCC-FM broadcasts in the HD Radio format. Its HD2 digital subchannel formerly carried iHeartRadio's reggae music service "iRie Radio". Its HD3 subchannel carries a simulcast of WAYA-FM, which airs the WAY-FM Network contemporary Christian format.

== History ==
=== Early years ===
On May 19, 1983, the station signed on the air as WBJX. It was owned by Sunrise Broadcasting, and aired an adult contemporary music format. It’s effective radiated power was 3,000 watts, a fraction of its current output.

The following year, WBJX was bought by O'Grady Communications, which switched the call sign to WLNB. The station featured an early form of Urban Adult Contemporary called Heart & Soul, FM 94 WLNB. The station aimed its programming at Charleston's African American community.

In 1987, WLNB was sold to Jones Eastern Broadcasting of Charleston, which changed the station to a rhythmic contemporary format or "CHUrban" as Hot 94 under the call letters WWHT, with the HT standing for Hot. The Hot 94 disc jockeys or "Hot Jocks" as they were known, included Madeline (formerly of crosstown Album Rock WAVF) for mornings, Mick Barker (from rival Top 40 outlet WSSX) for middays, with Chris Kelly (from WMMC/Columbia) for the afternoon, and Rocky Love (from WXTU/Philadelphia) for evenings. The station was programmed by Bob Casey, formerly Vice President of Programming of crosstown WXTC.

=== Switch to Oldies ===
Hot 94 failed to make headway due to strong competition from Top 40 stations WKQB (Q-107) and WSSX (95SSX). Hot 94 had a 3,000-watt signal, while WKQB and WSSX were 100,000 watts. In mid-1989, Hot 94 dumped the CHUrban format as well as much of the staff and flipped to oldies as Hot Gold 94 WWHT. Again, ratings failed to materialize.

In early 1990, WWHT switched to an Urban Contemporary format as WUJM, 94 Jams. But once again, the station faced strong competition from established Urban stations WWWZ and WPAL-FM. It switched to easy listening and soft adult contemporary by late 1991 as "Easy 94.3".

=== Fly 94 and The Beat ===
In the Fall of 1992, WUJM entered into a local marketing agreement (LMA) with WSSX, which resulted in the station's format changed to contemporary hit radio (CHR) as "Fly 94." The call sign switched to WSPP that October. Although the station became Charleston's only CHR when WSSX moved to a Hot Adult Contemporary format in December 1992, the ratings for WSSP were still low. In September 1993, the LMA was broken off and WSSP flipped to satellite fed adult standards as "Stardust 94.3."

In 1999, Clear Channel Broadcasting, the forerunner to current owner iHeartMedia, bought both WSCC and WSSP. WSSP dropped adult standards for a return to Rhythmic Contemporary under the "94.3 The Beat" name. In the Spring 1999 ratings, The Beat finished second to WWWZ among 18-34 listeners and doubled its numbers with that audience. By 2002, WSSP flipped to Urban Contemporary as "Power 94.3." Clear Channel also boosted WSSP's power to 25,000 watts, allowing it to be heard around Charleston and most of its suburbs.

=== Debut of Talk format ===
WSCC's signal on AM 730 was limited to 1,000 watts by day and 100 watts at night. Clear Channel wanted to make its talk radio format more widely available. As a result, in early 2004, WSSP dropped the urban format and began simulcasting WSCC's talk format. FM 94.3 would change callsigns to WSCC-FM.

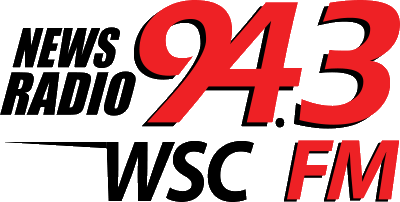
Former logo

After two weeks, the simulcast ended; with the talk radio format staying on WSCC-FM, the AM station's call sign became WLTQ and flipped to adult standards. Clear Channel sold WLTQ in 2008. Clear Channel switched its name to iHeartMedia in 2014.
