= WCKI =

Radio station in Greer, South Carolina

- Greer, South Carolina; United States
- Broadcast area: Upstate South Carolina
- Frequency: 1300 AM
- Branding: "Catholic Radio"

Programming
- Format: Catholic programming

Ownership
- Owner: Mediatrix SC, Inc.
- Sister stations: WLTQ (AM)

History
- First air date: March 3, 1955

Technical information
- Licensing authority: FCC
- Facility ID: 60503
- Class: D
- Power: 1000 watts daytime 94 watts night
- Transmitter coordinates: 34°55′39″N 82°15′42″W
- Translator: (105.3 MHz) W287DF (Greer)

Links
- Public license information: Public file; LMS
- Website: http://catholicradioinsc.com/

WCKI (1300 AM) is a radio station operating on 1300 kHz in Greer, South Carolina, United States. Broadcasting Catholic programming, WCKI is owned and operated by Mediatrix Radio.
