= WRFQ (FM) =

- Mount Pleasant, South Carolina; United States
- Broadcast area: Charleston metropolitan area; South Carolina Lowcountry
- Frequency: 104.5 MHz (HD Radio)
- Branding: Q-104.5

Programming
- Format: Classic rock
- Affiliations: Westwood One

Ownership
- Owner: iHeartMedia, Inc.; (iHM Licenses, LLC)
- Sister stations: WEZL, WSCC-FM, WXLY

History
- First air date: June 1, 1985
- Former call signs: WDXZ (1985–1993); WJUK (1993–1996)

Technical information
- Licensing authority: FCC
- Facility ID: 38901
- Class: C1
- ERP: 100,000 watts
- HAAT: 201 meters (659 ft)
- Transmitter coordinates: 32°49′4.00″N 79°50′9.00″W

Links
- Public license information: Public file; LMS
- Webcast: Listen live (via iHeartRadio)
- Website: q1045.iheart.com

WRFQ (104.5 FM, "Q-104.5") is a commercial radio station licensed to Mount Pleasant, South Carolina, and serving the Charleston metropolitan area and Lowcountry of South Carolina. Owned by iHeartMedia, it features a classic rock format, with studios and transmitter located in Mount Pleasant. In addition to a standard analog transmission, WRFQ broadcasts in HD Radio and is available online via iHeartRadio.

== History ==
On June 1, 1985, the station first signed on the air. Its call sign was WDXZ and it carried an automated easy listening sound, including news supplied by CBS Radio News. It later switched to urban contemporary as "Foxy 104.5".

In 1993, it became WJUK, playing country music.

On April 26, 1996, it switched its call letters to WRFQ. Originally playing classic hits music, the station evolved to its current format of classic rock in 1998.

== Programming ==
WRFQ plays popular classic rock songs, primarily from the 1970s and 80s, with some titles from the 60s and 90s also in the playlist. The station carries the nationally syndicated Bob and Tom Morning Show. The rest of the weekday schedule features shows that are voicetracked from iHeart DJs based at other stations.

== HD-2 ==
Beginning in January 2009, the station added an HD Radio digital subchannel. At first, it carried Alternative Rock as "The Drive", a format previously heard on co-owned WALC-FM. That station was sold in January to the Radio Training Group for a Christian contemporary music format.

The HD-2 subchannel later switched to Hip Hop music, using the iHeartRadio "Hip Hop Workout" channel.
