= WXLY =

- North Charleston, South Carolina; United States
- Broadcast area: Charleston metropolitan area
- Frequency: 102.5 MHz (HD Radio)
- Branding: Y102.5

Programming
- Language: English
- Format: Adult contemporary
- Subchannels: HD2: Radio by Grace (Christian radio)

Ownership
- Owner: iHeartMedia, Inc.; (iHM Licenses, LLC)
- Sister stations: WEZL, WRFQ, WSCC-FM

History
- First air date: April 1958
- Former call signs: WKTM (1958–1984)

Technical information
- Licensing authority: FCC
- Facility ID: 34163
- Class: C1
- ERP: 100,000 watts
- HAAT: 201 meters (659 ft)
- Transmitter coordinates: 32°49′4.00″N 79°50′9.00″W
- Translators: HD2: 104.9 W285DV (Charleston); HD2: 105.1 W286AY (Charleston)

Links
- Public license information: Public file; LMS
- Webcast: Listen live (via iHeartRadio)
- Website: y1025.iheart.com; HD2 website

WXLY (102.5 FM) is a commercial radio station licensed to North Charleston, South Carolina, and serving the Charleston metropolitan area, owned by iHeartMedia, Inc. The station airs an adult contemporary radio format branded Y102.5 with the slogan "Better Music For A Better Workday." WXLY's studios and offices are on Houston Northcutt Boulevard in Mount Pleasant.

WXLY's transmitter is situated off Venning Road in Mount Pleasant. WXLY broadcasts using HD Radio technology, its HD-2 digital subchannel carries Radio By Grace, which in turn feeds two FM translators.

== History ==
In April 1958, the station signed on the air as WKTM.

By the early 1980s, the station played album-oriented rock. The switch to the WXLY call sign and Y-102 moniker was made when the station flipped to country music. Later in the 1980s, the station played oldies and classic hits.

WXLY featured an oldies format for years. In 2004, the station's name was changed from "Oldies 102.5" to "Y102.5", to eliminate the usage of the word 'old.' In March 2005, WXLY shifted to 1970s based classic hits, even including some 1980s AC songs. The new slogan was "The Greatest Hits of All Time." The evolution was taken a step further in late 2006 when the station adopted the slogan 'Music to Make You Feel Good', and unveiled a new, upbeat presentation with a new voice talent, new jingles, and a pastel-colored website. The logo was altered to give it a more contemporary feel.

The music was once again adjusted later in 2007 to Mainstream AC from the 1970s through 2000s, following the flip of competitor WSUY. The station's once-association with the oldies format has now been completely transformed to AC, except for the name, which has remained the same.
