= Scottville School =

- U.S. National Register of Historic Places
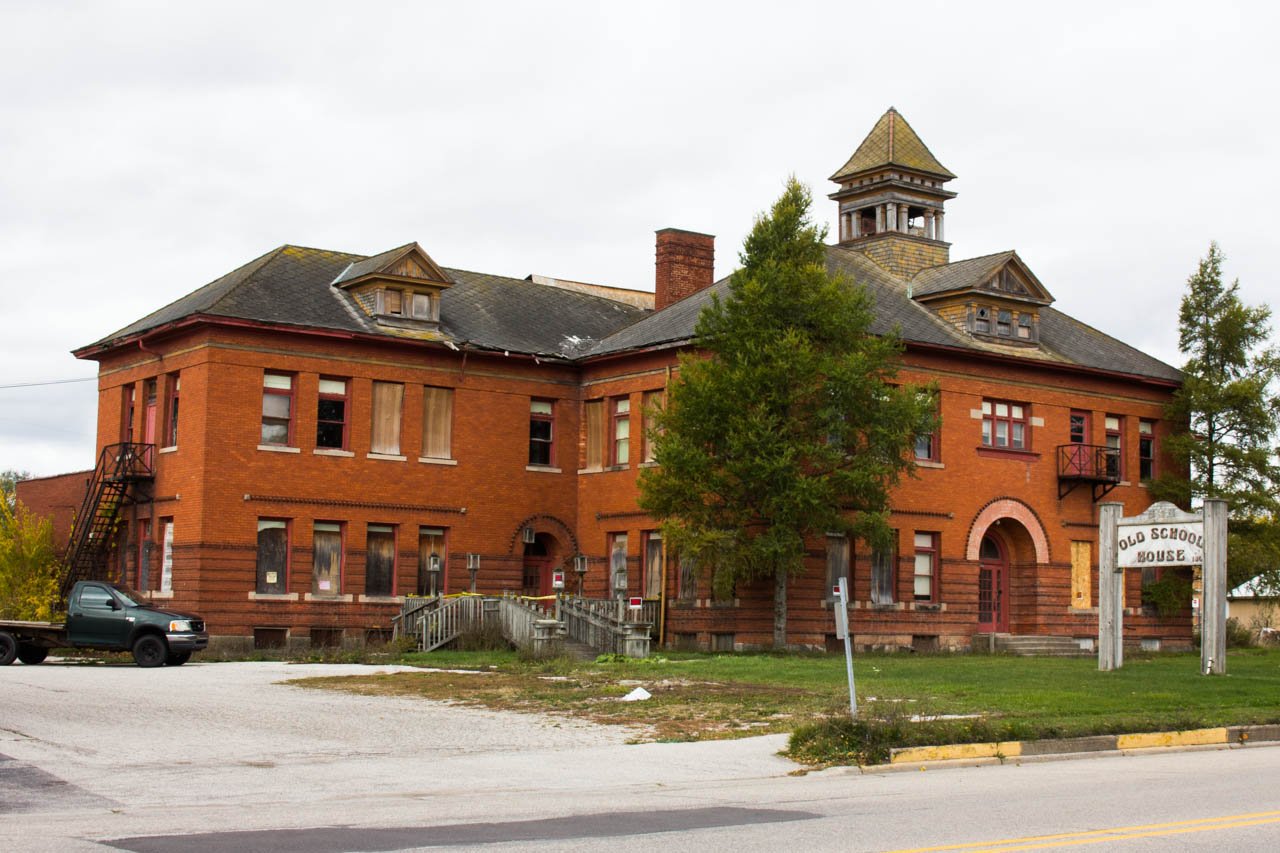
- Scottville School in 2013

- Location within Michigan Location within the United States
- Interactive map
- Location: 209 N. Main St., Scottville, Michigan (Demolished)
- Coordinates: 43°57′25″N 86°16′48″W
- Area: 1.4 acres (0.57 ha)
- Built: 1888
- Architectural style: Romanesque
- Demolished: 2026
- NRHP reference No.: 01000571
- Added to NRHP: May 30, 2001

The Scottville School, also known as the Old School House, was a school located at 209 North Main Street in Scottville, Michigan. It was listed on the National Register of Historic Places in 1985 and was demolished in 2026.

== History ==
The Scottville School was constructed in 1888, and served as Scottville's only school until the 1950s. Additions were made to the school in 1893, 1903, 1911, and 1927. It was used as the high school and middle school until 1976, when the Mason County Central Middle School was built.

After closing, the building was used by Faith Tech, a Christian training school. Faith Tech moved out in 1979, and the building was vacant for years until being opened as a retail outlet in the 1990s. That closed in 1996, and it sat vacant again until 2012, when it was purchased by John Wilton, who began refurbishing it.

However, part of the roof collapsed, and the interior of the building deteriorated to a point that it was too costly to repair. Demolition began on the “Old School House” on May 1, 2026, and was completed by the 26th. Plans are to create housing on the reclaimed property. Bricks and cabinets from the building will be sold by the Scottville Clown Band to benefit the Mason County Central (MCC) band program.

== Description ==
The Scottville School was a large brick structure, originally constructed in 1888 but with multiple later additions that altered its footprint. An additional single story frame building, measuring 20 feet (6.1 m) by 30 feet (9.1 m), was also part of the complex.

The main brick building was a symmetrical cross-shaped structure with hipped roof projecting center and wings, and a pyramid-roofed central square tower. Three gabled dormers projected from the front. Both the central projection (1903) and the wings (1911) were additions to the original square plan of the building. A flat-roofed gymnasium was attached to the rear of the building.

The facade had broad, round-topped doorways and tall, square, transomed windows. Interior passageways around the central foyer were arched, and a central double staircase rose in the center.
