= Scottville, Michigan =

- City
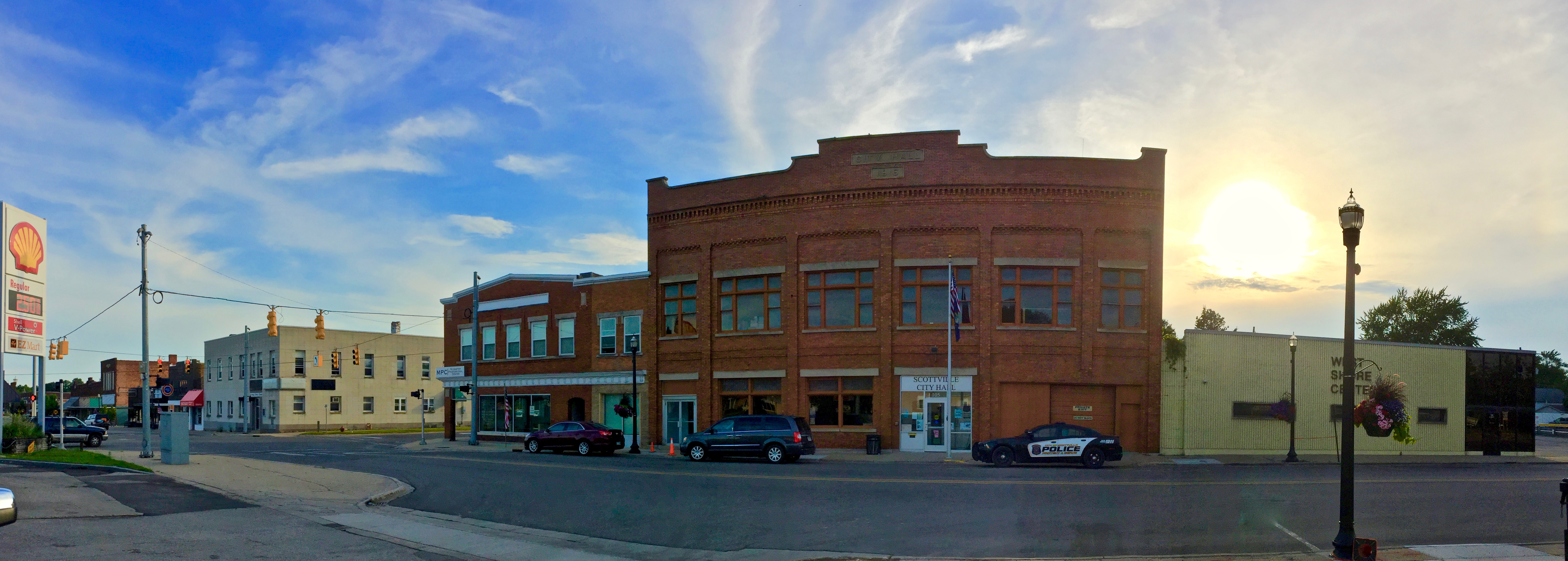
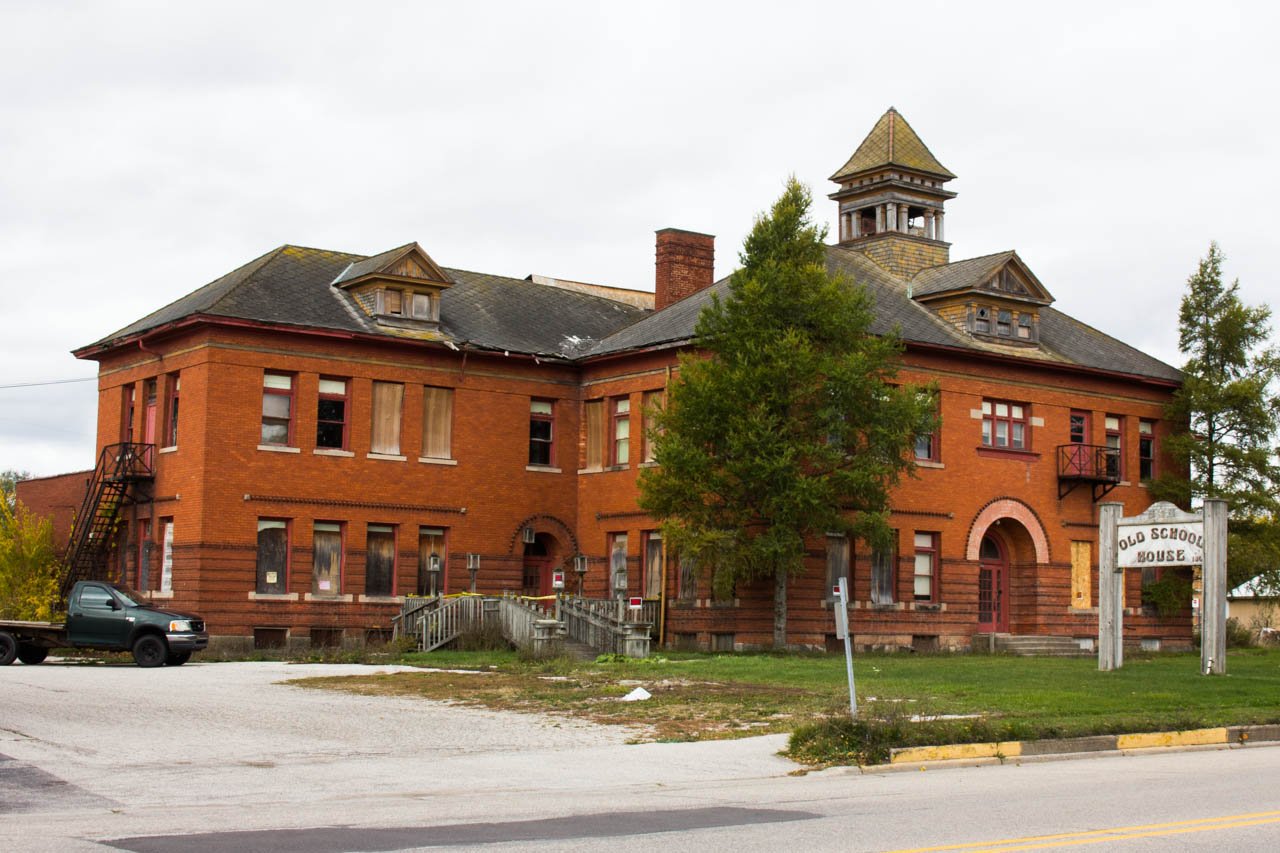
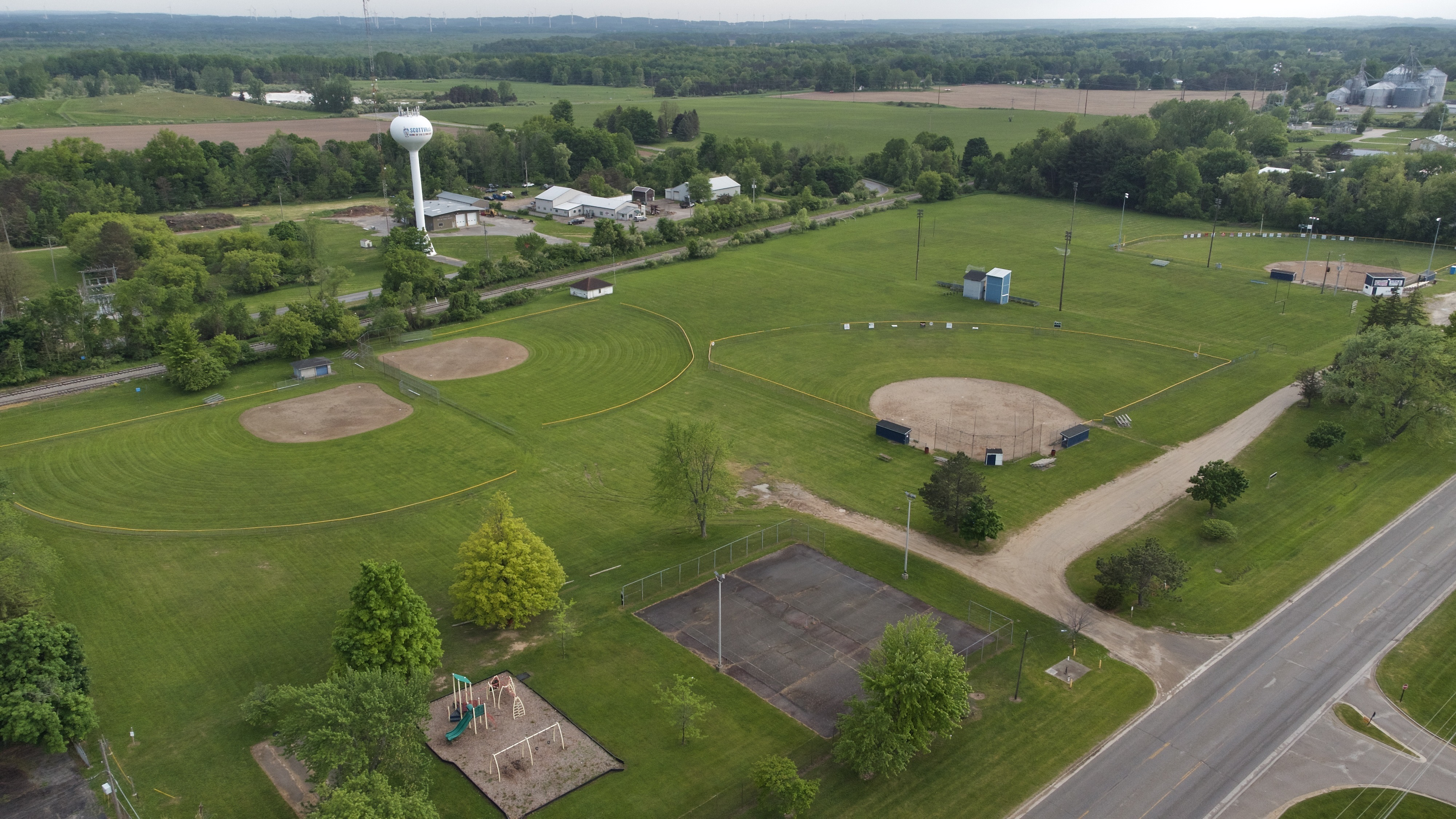
- From top, clockwise: Main Street facing the city hall toward US 10, McPhail Field, Scottville School

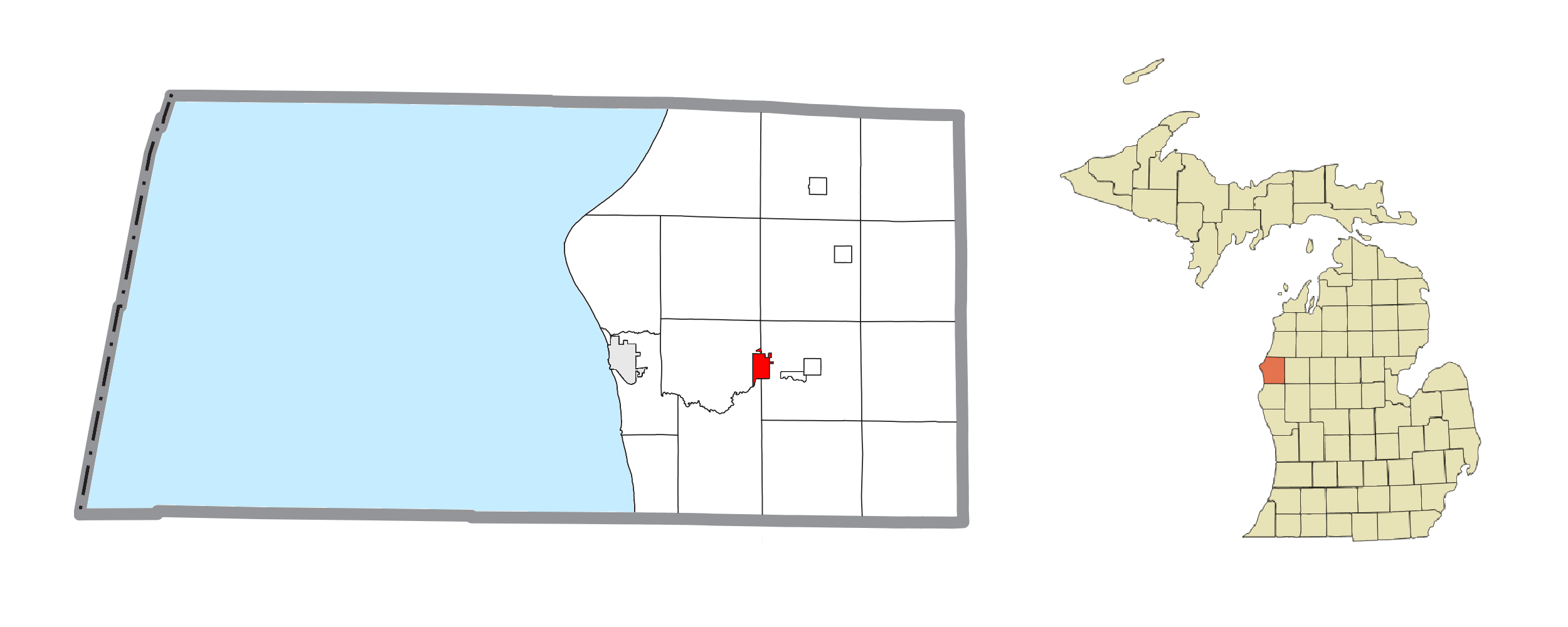
- Location within Mason County

- Location within Michigan Location within the United States
- Coordinates: 43°57′15″N 86°16′54″W
- Country: United States
- State: Michigan
- County: Mason
- Founded: 1874
- Platted: 1882
- Incorporated: 1889 (village); 1907 (city)

Government
  - Type: City commission
  - Mayor: Bruce Krieger
  - Manager: Courtney Magaluk
  - Clerk: Kelse Lester

Area
  - Total: 1.49 sq mi (3.86 km^{2})
  - Land: 1.49 sq mi (3.86 km^{2})
  - Water: 0 sq mi (0.00 km^{2})
- Elevation: 692 ft (211 m)

Population (2020)
  - Total: 1,356
  - Density: 910/sq mi (351.4/km^{2})
- Time zone: UTC-5 (Eastern (EST))
  - Summer (DST): UTC-4 (EDT)
- ZIP Code: 49454
- Area code: 231
- FIPS code: 26-72080
- GNIS feature ID: 1621550
- Website: cityofscottville.org

Scottville is a city in Mason County in the U.S. state of Michigan. The population was 1,356 at the 2020 census.

== History ==
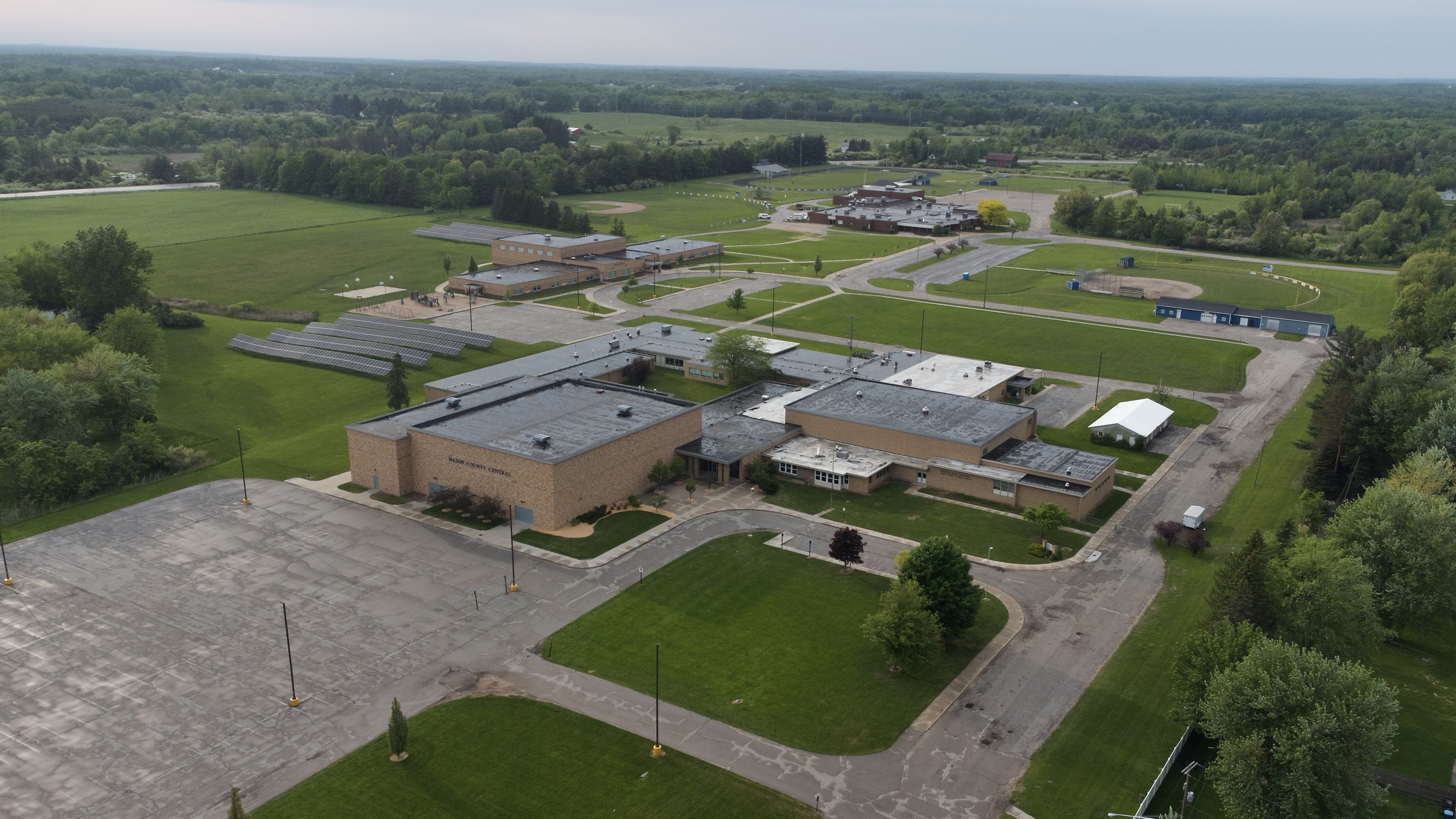
Mason County Central schools

The area was first mapped in 1874 as a stop along the Pere Marquette Railway. It was originally called "Mason Center", as it was in the center of the county. It was later renamed "Sweetland", after James Sweetland, who built a sawmill there in 1878. Hiram Scott platted the land in 1882, and won the right to rename the settlement "Scottville" after winning a coin toss. Scottville was incorporated as a village in 1889 and as a city in 1907.

On July 23, 2007, Governor Jennifer Granholm announced Scottville as the community chosen by the Michigan State Housing Development Authority (MSHDA) to take part in the Cool Cities Michigan Main Street program. Scottville was to receive five years of intensive technical assistance through MSHDA, to help create opportunities for new development, economic growth and jobs. A similar award, the Blueprints for Downtowns award, were announced to be received by the communities of Caro, Clio and Ypsilanti.

== Geography ==
Scottville is in central Mason County, 8 miles (13 km) east of the city of Ludington and Lake Michigan, 3 miles (5 km) west of the village of Custer, and 8 miles (13 km) southwest of the village of Fountain (11 miles (18 km) by road).

According to the U.S. Census Bureau, the city has a total area of 1.49 square miles (3.86 km^{2}), all land.

== Demographics ==
Historical population
Census	Pop.	Note	%±
1890	147		—
1900	554		276.9%
1910	891		60.8%
1920	1,045		17.3%
1930	1,002		−4.1%
1940	1,162		16.0%
1950	1,142		−1.7%
1960	1,245		9.0%
1970	1,202		−3.5%
1980	1,241		3.2%
1990	1,287		3.7%
2000	1,266		−1.6%
2010	1,214		−4.1%
2020	1,356		11.7%
U.S. Decennial Census

=== 2010 census ===
As of the census of 2010, there were 1,214 people, 483 households, and 309 families living in the city. The population density was 814.8 inhabitants per square mile (314.6/km^{2}). There were 578 housing units at an average density of 387.9 per square mile (149.8/km^{2}). The racial makeup of the city was 92.9% White, 0.9% African American, 0.9% Native American, 0.5% Asian, 2.0% from other races, and 2.8% from two or more races. Hispanic or Latino of any race were 5.3% of the population.

There were 483 households, of which 34.8% had children under the age of 18 living with them, 38.9% were married couples living together, 19.7% had a female householder with no husband present, 5.4% had a male householder with no wife present, and 36.0% were non-families. 32.3% of all households were made up of individuals, and 11.2% had someone living alone who was 65 years of age or older. The average household size was 2.51 and the average family size was 3.09.

The median age in the city was 35.1 years. 28.2% of residents were under the age of 18; 8.9% were between the ages of 18 and 24; 25% were from 25 to 44; 24.3% were from 45 to 64; and 13.8% were 65 years of age or older. The gender makeup of the city was 47.9% male and 52.1% female.

=== 2000 census ===
As of the census of 2000, there were 1,266 people, 525 households, and 345 families living in the city. The population density was 866.5 inhabitants per square mile (334.6/km^{2}). There were 574 housing units at an average density of 392.9 per square mile (151.7/km^{2}). The racial makeup of the city was 94.47% White, 0.63% African American, 0.87% Native American, 0.16% Asian, 1.26% from other races, and 2.61% from two or more races. Hispanic or Latino of any race were 4.82% of the population.

There were 525 households, out of which 33.7% had children under the age of 18 living with them, 43.6% were married couples living together, 17.5% had a female householder with no husband present, and 34.1% were non-families. 31.0% of all households were made up of individuals, and 13.7% had someone living alone who was 65 years of age or older. The average household size was 2.40 and the average family size was 2.97.

In the city, the population was spread out, with 27.3% under the age of 18, 10.2% from 18 to 24, 25.2% from 25 to 44, 20.9% from 45 to 64, and 16.4% who were 65 years of age or older. The median age was 36 years. For every 100 females, there were 86.7 males. For every 100 females age 18 and over, there were 80.9 males.

The median income for a household in the city was $27,750, and the median income for a family was $36,875. Males had a median income of $26,583 versus $22,917 for females. The per capita income for the city was $15,703. About 15.5% of families and 18.4% of the population were below the poverty line, including 32.8% of those under age 18 and 1.9% of those age 65 or over.

== Education ==
West Shore Community College, a two-year college established in 1967, is located just northwest of Scottville.

With regard to K-12 education, it is in the Mason County Central Schools school district.

== Notable people ==
- Maynard James Keenan, musician
