= Ludington Public Library =

Public library in Ludington, Michigan, US

- 43.956°N 86.4454°W
- Location: 217 E. Ludington Ave; Ludington, Michigan
- Established: 1906
- Branch of: Mason County District Library

Other information
- Website: www.masoncounty.lib.mi.us

The Ludington Public Library is one of the two branches of the Mason County District Library administrative system. This library, as the main branch, is located in downtown Ludington, in Mason County in the Lower Peninsula of Michigan. The library started in 1872.

The Pere Marquette Literary Club helped in the formation of a permanent city library. They took financial support from Andrew Carnegie to construct the library building, which opened in 1906. The building has since had major expansions and is still operational.

The library has metal allegorical sculptures at various parts of its surrounding property.

== History ==
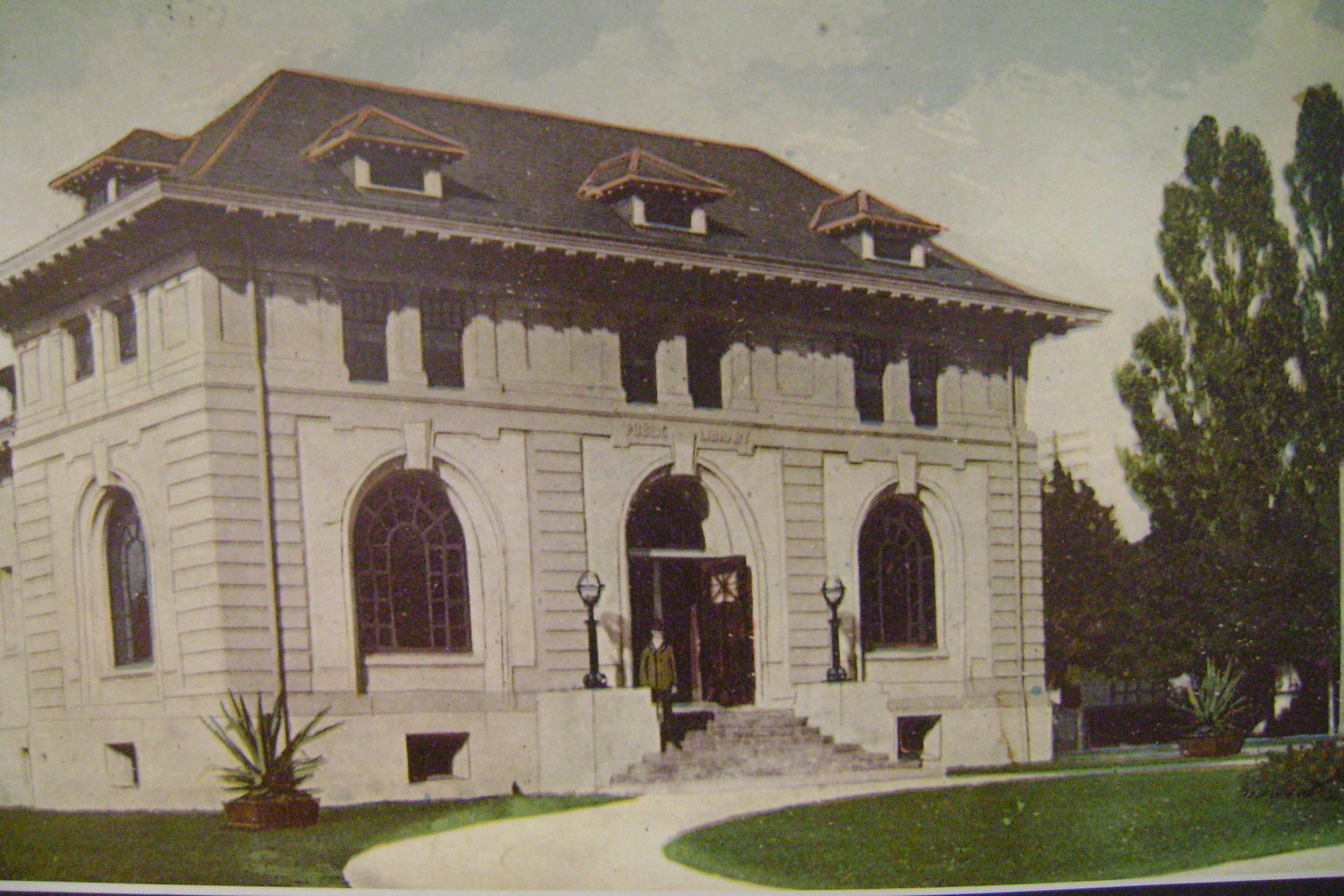
Ludington Public library 1906

The Ludington Public Library had its beginnings 1872. In 1881, the building and all library contents were destroyed in a major city fire. The Pere Marquette Literary Club worked to obtain a grant from the Carnegie Institution for construction of the new Ludington library.

In 1906, the Ludington Carnegie library building was declared as the library that will "stand a thousand years."

On March 1, 1906, with 3,800 books in its collection, the library made its debut.

In 2011, after firing a staff member for releasing a "tell all" about the library and its "unsavory regulars", the library was sued in a federal court for free speech violations.

== Sculptures ==
The "Flights of Learning" sculpture is at the front of the Ludington Public Library.

The "Double the Fun" sculpture was installed in 2014. Modeled by sculptor W. Stanley Proctor, it pays tribute to a high school English teacher Sallie Peterson Ferguson. It shows her sitting on a bench reading to a young boy and girl, representing her passion for reading.

== Gallery ==
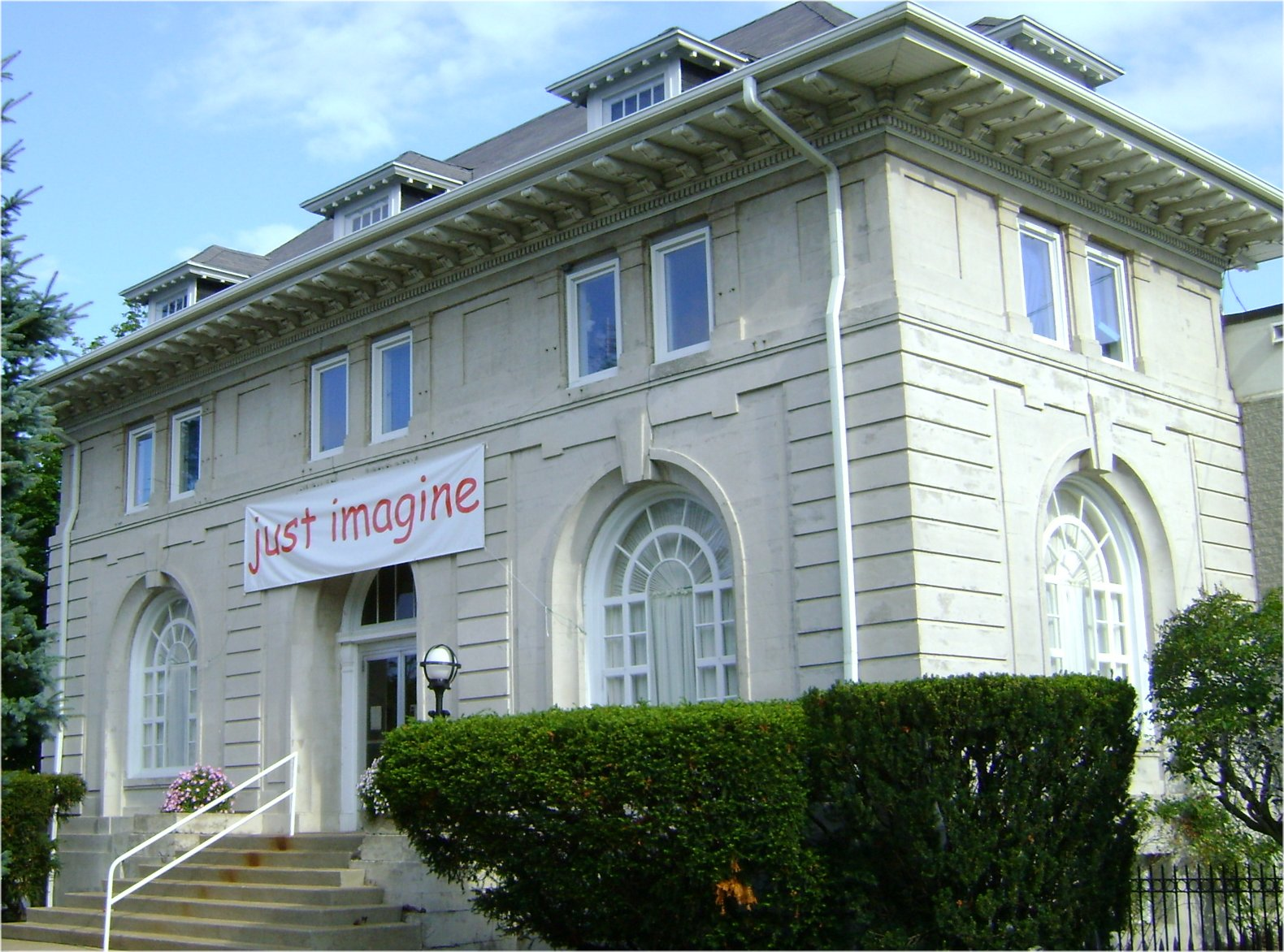
Ludington Public Library
front exterior in 2008

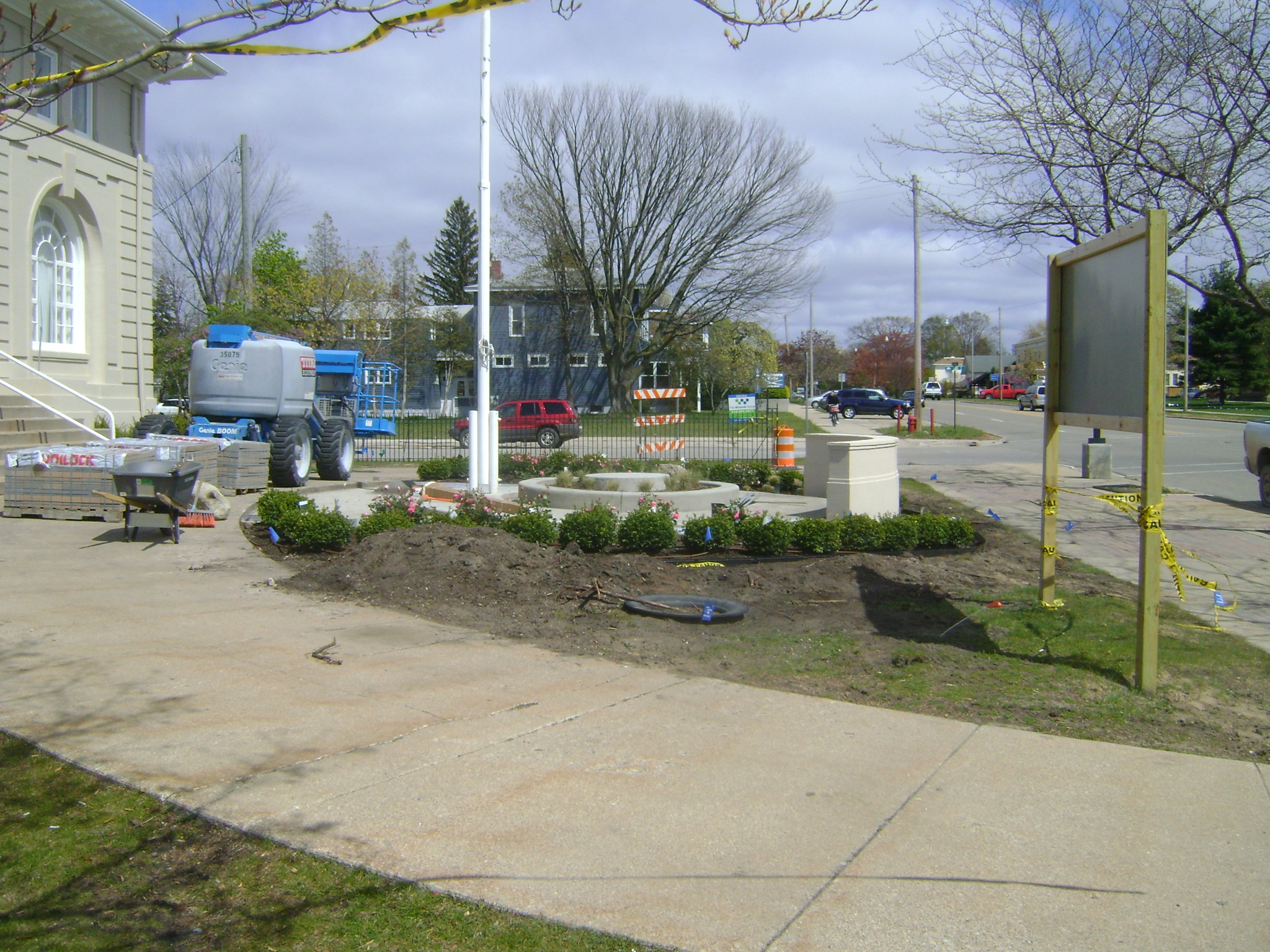
Ludington library new front landscape, April 2012

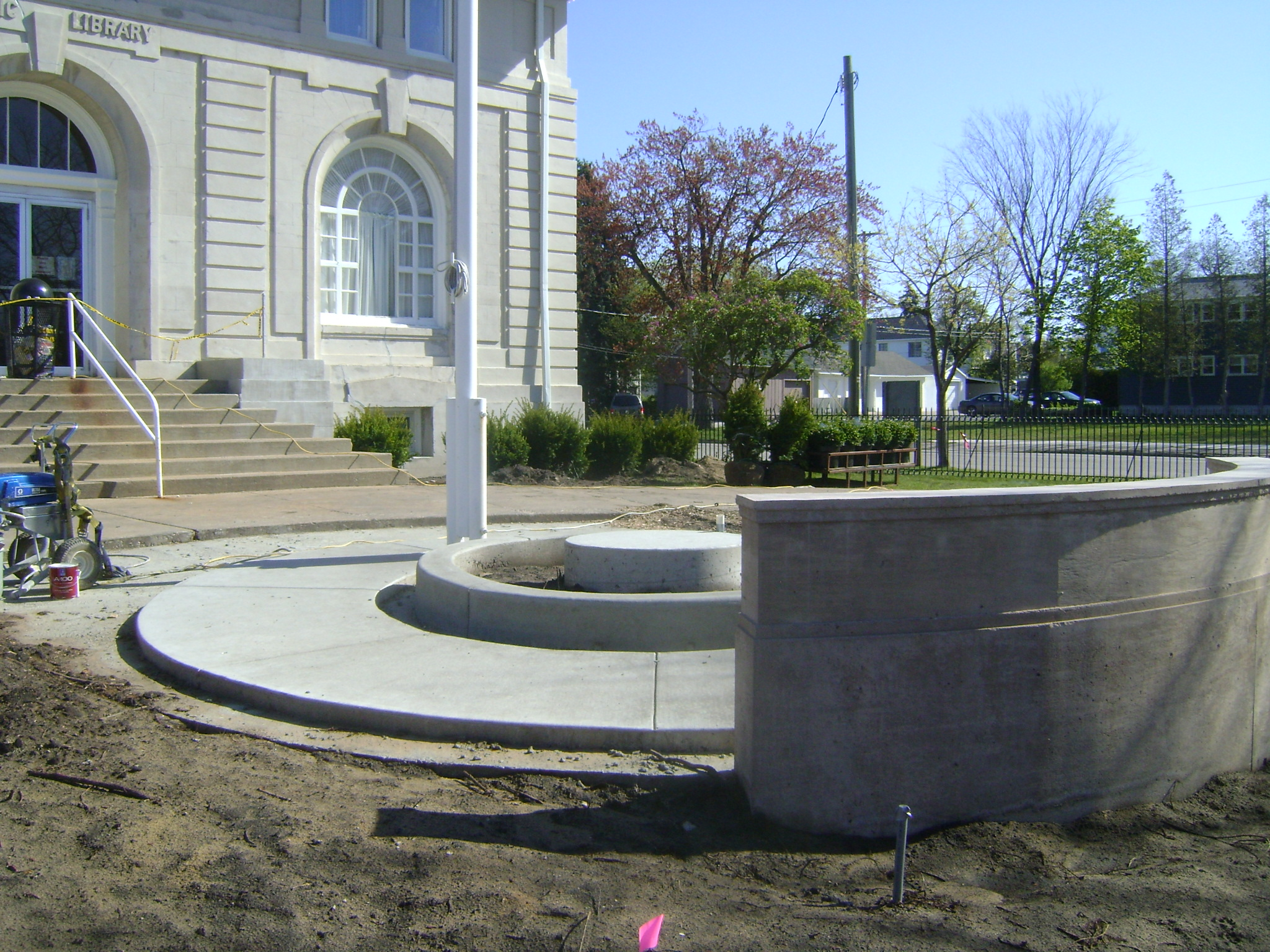
Ludington Library platform statue base built in 2012

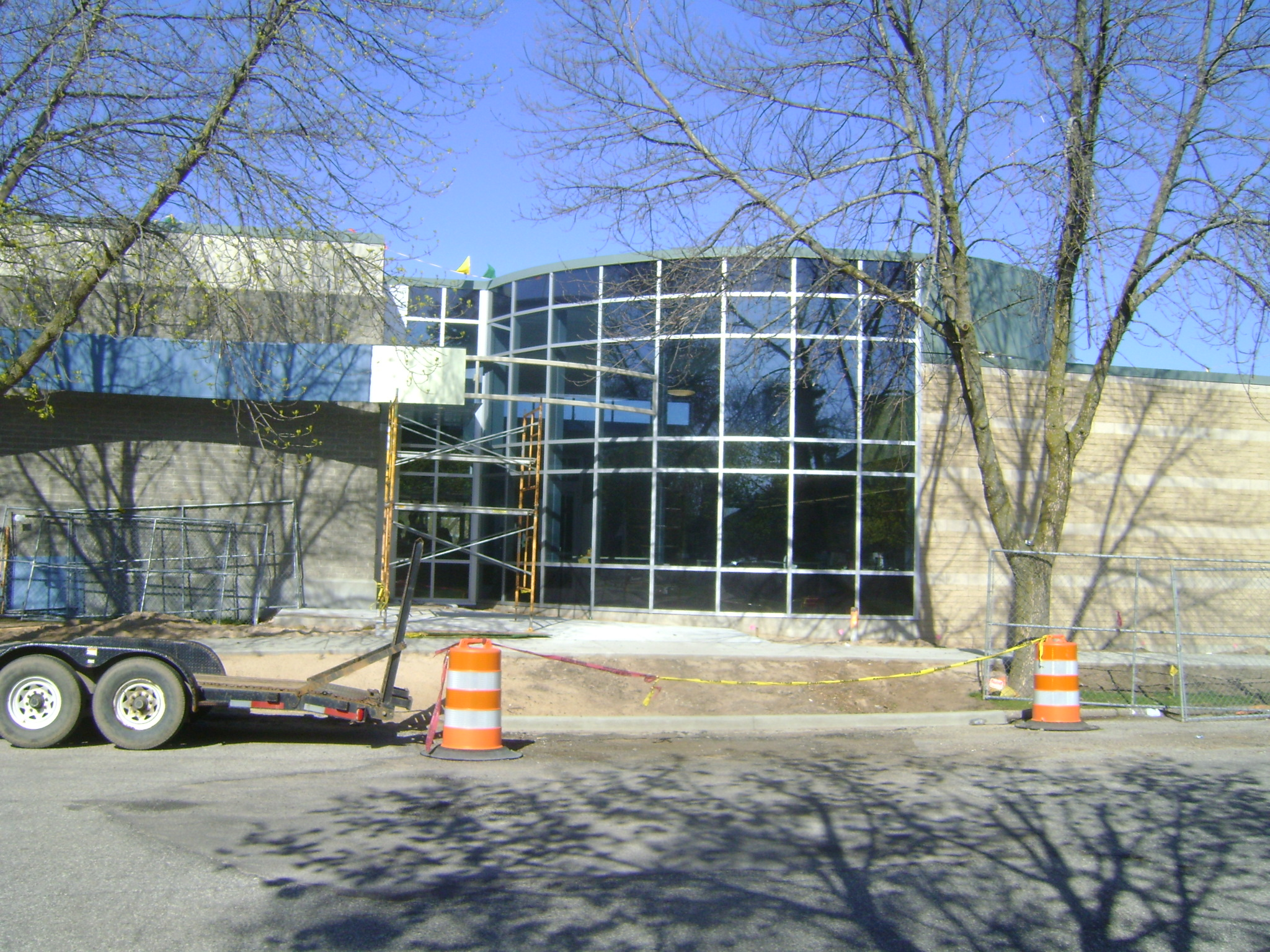
Ludington Public Library new side entrance work of 2012

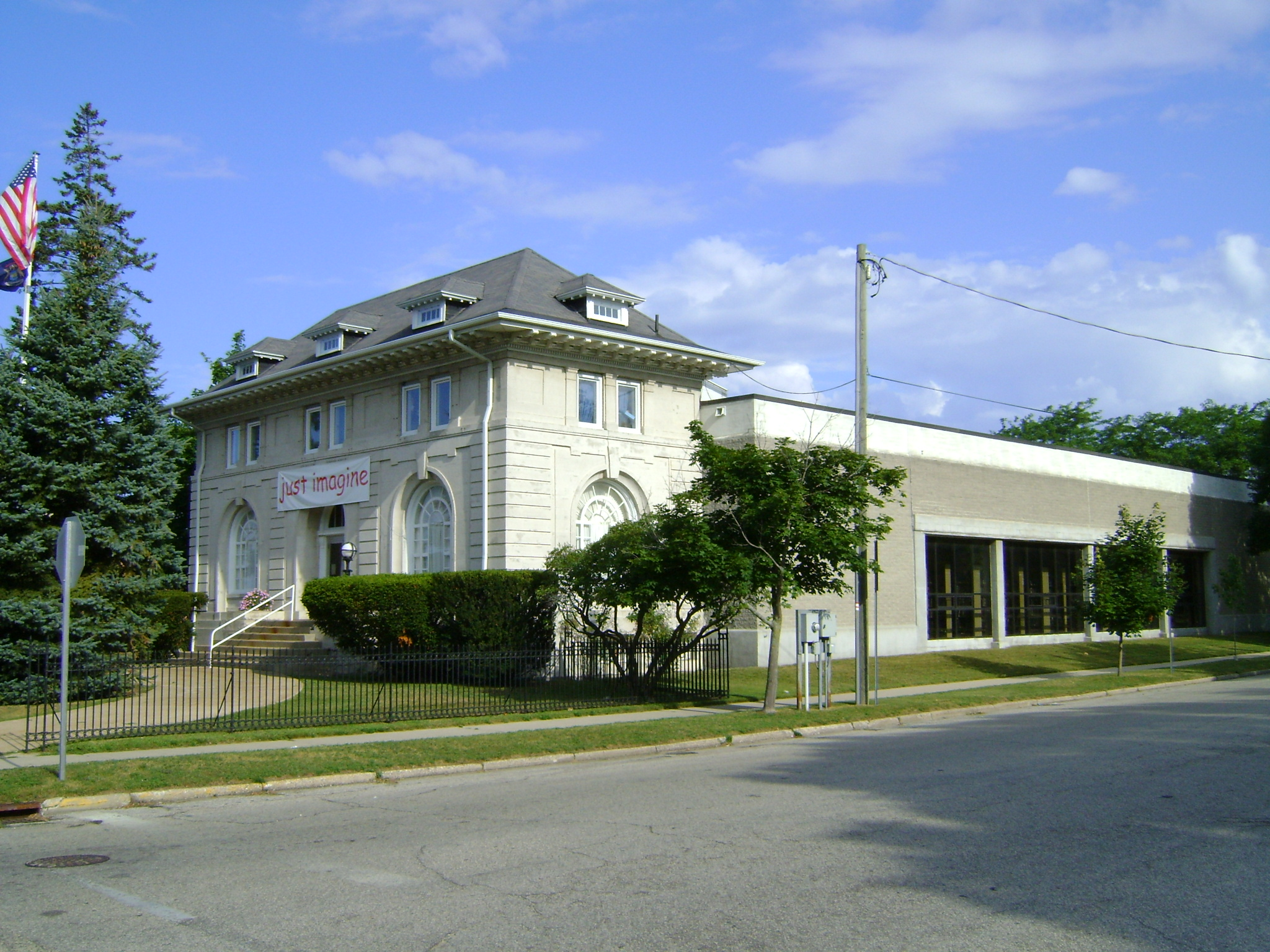
Ludington Public Library addition of 1976

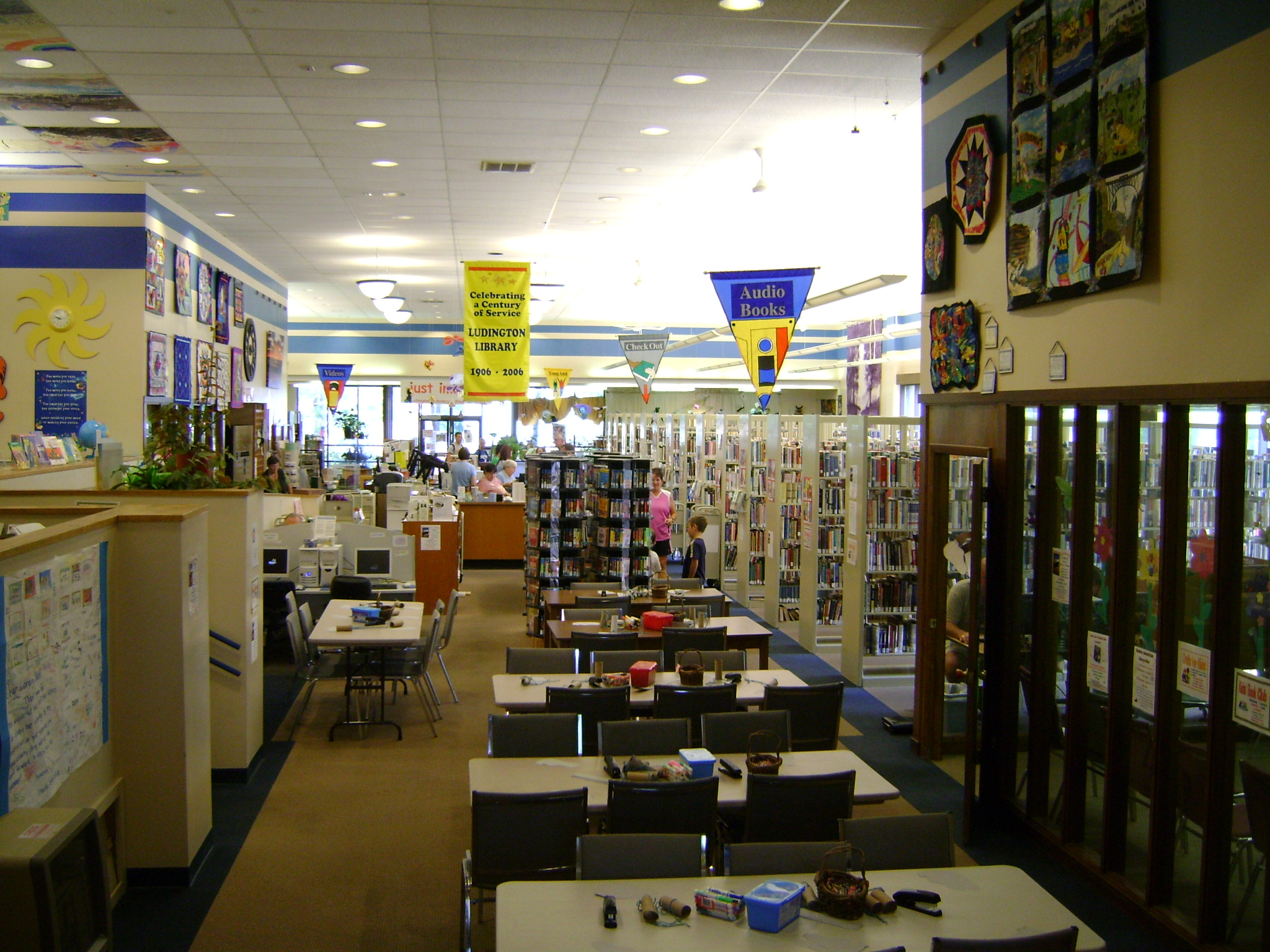
Ludington Public library interior 2008

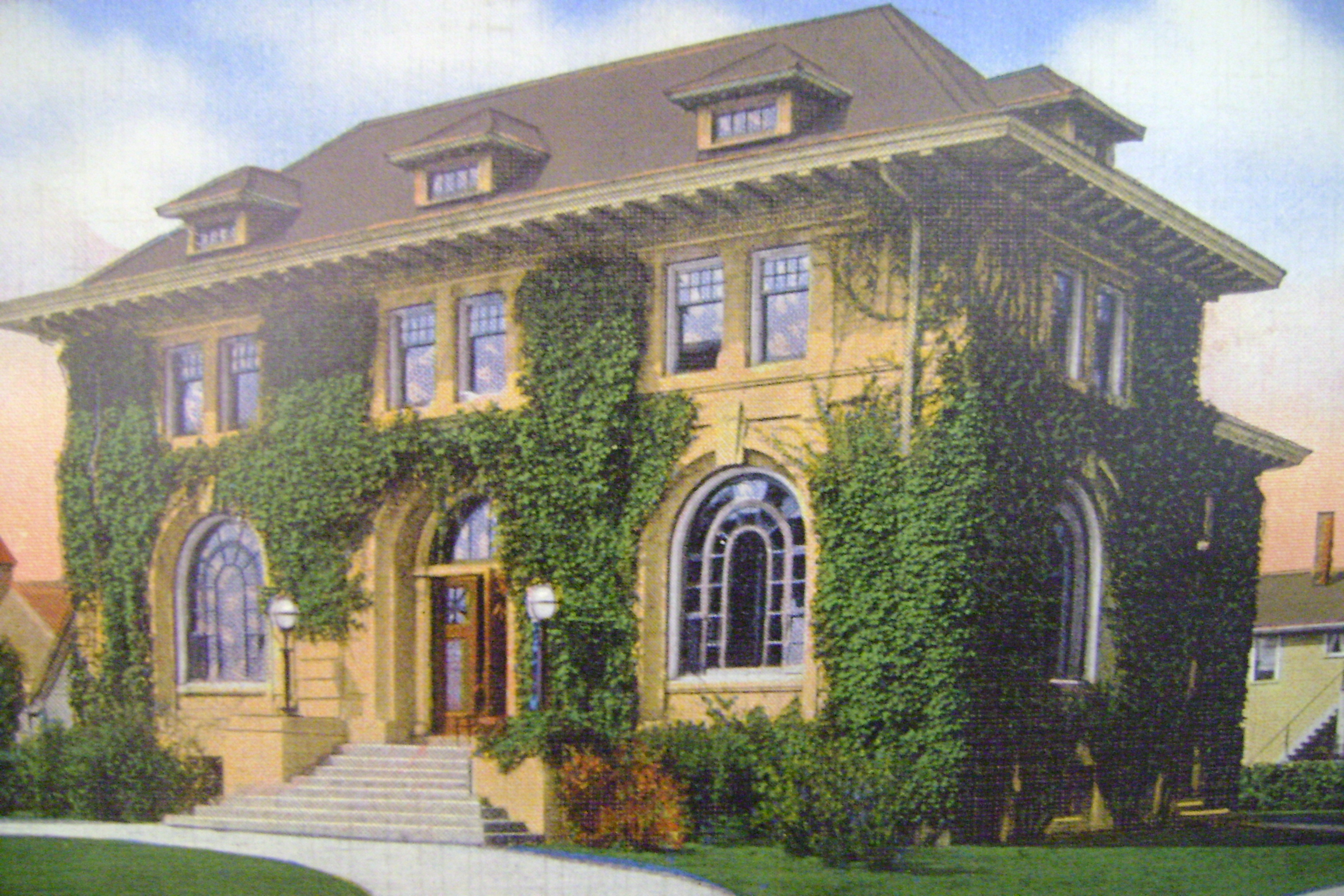
Ludington Public library, c. 1925
