= WAYA-FM =

- Ridgeville, South Carolina; United States
- Broadcast area: Charleston metropolitan area
- Frequency: 100.9 MHz
- Branding: 100.9/101.3 Way FM

Programming
- Format: Christian contemporary
- Network: WayFM Network

Ownership
- Owner: WayFM Network; (Hope Media Group)

History
- First air date: September 1968
- Former call signs: WALD-FM (1968–1979); WKYP (1979–1981); WALD-FM (1981–1992); WNTC (1992–1993); WPAL-FM (1993–2010)
- Call sign meaning: WAY

Technical information
- Licensing authority: FCC
- Facility ID: 25374
- Class: C3
- ERP: 13,000 watts
- HAAT: 91 meters (299 ft)
- Transmitter coordinates: 33°4′25.70″N 80°11′54.20″W
- Translator: 101.3 W267BK (Mount Pleasant)
- Repeater: 94.3 WSCC-FM HD3 (Goose Creek)

Links
- Public license information: Public file; LMS
- Webcast: Listen live
- Website: wayfm.com

WAYA-FM (100.9 FM) is a non-commercial radio station licensed to Ridgeville, South Carolina, United States, and serving the Charleston metropolitan area. It airs the WayFM Network and its Christian contemporary format, owned and operated by the Hope Media Group.

WAYA-FM's transmitter is sited on Kenyon Lane off Interstate 26 in Summerville. Programming is also heard on low-power FM translator W267BK on 101.3 MHz in Mount Pleasant.

== History ==
The station signed on the air in September 1968. It was licensed to Walterboro, South Carolina. The call sign had been WALD-FM, the sister station to WALD 1060 AM, which is now dark.

William Saunders owned R&B radio station WPAL 730 AM, which had long served the African-American community in Charleston. In 1994, Saunders bought the FM frequency and moved it to Charleston. He changed the format to urban adult contemporary, with the call sign WPAL-FM.

The Hope Media Group acquired the station in 2010. It switched the station to non-commercial Christian Contemporary music, supplied by its WAY-FM network. The call letters changed to WAYA-FM. Most stations owned by Hope Media have WAY in their call signs.
