= West Shore Community College =

Community college in Scottville, Michigan, U.S.

- Motto: Where students come first!
- Type: Public community college
- Established: 1967
- President: Scott Ward
- Students: 1190 (Winter semester 2016)
- Location: Scottville, Michigan, United States; 44.0089°N 86.3371°W
- Campus: rural (360 acres)
- Nickname: Foxes
- Mascot: Westy the Fox
- Website: www.westshore.edu

West Shore Community College is a public community college in Scottville, Michigan, United States.

== History ==
In 1967 West Shore was established on 365 acres between Ludington and Manistee in Mason County, Michigan. Along with this main campus, West Shore also has a center in Manistee County, just north of the city of Manistee.

Planning for the college began in 1962 with high school superintendents from three adjacent counties meeting to discuss the possibility of a community college in their districts. In September 1968, part-time faculty members were hired to teach evening courses at local high schools. The first permanent structure was the Campus Center (now the Administrative Building), which was dedicated in the spring of 1970; prior to this, classes were held in six relocatable classrooms the college had purchased.

Since 1967, West Shore Community college has experienced growth in student body as well as facilities. From an initial enrollment in the fall of 1968 of 118 students and an initial graduating class of 62 students, the college has grown to a current enrollment close to 1,200 students, with the most recent graduation class consisting of nearly 140 students eligible to receive degrees or certificates.

Growth in facilities includes the following: In 2002, an 18,000 sq. ft. state-of-the-art science wing was added to the Arts and Sciences Center and West Shore Community College opened a 36,000 sq. ft. ice arena. In 2006, Manistee County Education Center, a partnership between the college and West Shore Medical Center, opened in Manistee. In 2008, the 38,000 sq. ft. Schoenherr Campus Center opened for students.

=== Leadership ===
John Eaton was the college's initial president; he served from 1967 to 1983. William M. Anderson was the college's second president, serving from 1983 to 1998. Afterward in 2001, Governor John Engler appointed Anderson the founding director of the Michigan Department of History, Arts and Libraries. Governor Jennifer Granholm reappointed Dr. Anderson to her cabinet, where he continued to serve as the director of HAL until 2009.

Charles T. Dillon served as West Shore Community College's third president from 1998 to 2014. He was succeeded by Kenneth Urban (2015–2017).

== Academics ==
West Shore Community College offers a variety of degree programs, one and two year certificates, as well as non-credit course options. some of these courses are offered online or in hybrid modes. More than 400 students each semester take online courses, with over 25 courses to choose from. Courses range from completely online or online with proctored testing to a blend of online and on-campus (hybrid) delivery. The college's online class presence has been growing such that in the Winter 2016 semester online course credit accounted for 20% of credits being attempted.

=== Accreditation ===
West Shore Community College participates in the Academic Quality Improvement Program (AQIP), a quality-based, continuous improvement model of accreditation through the Higher Learning Commission (HLC). This AQIP model is based on the Malcolm Baldrige National Quality Award Program and incorporates a review process designed to deliver clear, concrete and efficient feedback to participating institutions. Additionally, it provides assurance of institutional quality to HLC and other audiences and constituencies.

=== Partnerships ===
The college has articulation agreements with Ferris State University, Central Michigan University, Davenport University, and Walsh College. Learn more about WSCC Partnerships

== WSCC Foundation ==
The WSCC Foundation provides financial assistance that benefits the college, its students, and the communities it serves and is building its endowment fund to provide additional scholarships for students desiring to attend the college.

== Recreation ==
The Recreation Center offers non-credit, nominal fee recreation classes from body Shaping and Weight Training for seniors to swim lessons for kids. The Recreation Center has a 25-meter swimming pool and whirlpool, a weight room with free weights and other weight training equipment, one racquet ball court, an arena with six basketball goals, jogging and walking lanes, and areas that can be set up as indoor tennis courts or for volleyball.

West Shore Community Ice Arena provides hockey and open skating opportunities for area citizens. It is designed for year-round use, and contains a National Hockey League size ice surface. The West Shore Community Ice Arena is home to the West Shore Wolves Amateur Hockey Association, Manistee Chippewa Junior Varsity and Varsity Hockey programs.

== Community ==
In addition to offering instructional programs, the college serves the area with lectures, theater productions, dance and musical performances in the Center Stage Theater, art exhibits in the Manierre Dawson Gallery, and other types of entertainment for both student and community members.

Career counseling services are available offering a full range of advising and aptitude testing.

== Student organizations ==
The Student Organizations and Activities Program (SOAP) sponsors campus events and leadership opportunities designed to complement and enrich student learning in the classroom. The college has a number of student groups ranging from Phi Theta Kappa to the L.A.R.P. Club (Live Action Role-Playing). It is a fairly easy process for students to start a new club.
