= WCOZ (FM) =

Radio station in New Albany, Pennsylvania

- New Albany, Pennsylvania; United States
- Frequency: 91.7 MHz

Ownership
- Owner: J.M.J Radio
- Sister stations: WMMH

History
- Former call signs: WEVP (2008–2011); WPAL (2011–2017)

Technical information
- Licensing authority: FCC
- Facility ID: 177311
- Class: A
- ERP: 270 watts
- HAAT: 49.0 meters (160.8 ft)
- Transmitter coordinates: 41°26′6.00″N 76°28′28.00″W
- Repeater: W233BL (94.5 FM)

Links
- Public license information: Public file; LMS
- Webcast: Listen Live
- Website: http://www.jmj750.com/

WCOZ (91.7 FM) is a radio station licensed to New Albany, Pennsylvania, United States. The station is currently owned by J.M.J Radio.
