= WLTQ (AM) =

- Charleston, South Carolina; United States
- Broadcast area: South Carolina Lowcountry
- Frequency: 730 kHz

Programming
- Format: Catholic radio
- Affiliations: EWTN Radio

Ownership
- Owner: Mediatrix SC, Inc.
- Sister stations: WCKI

History
- First air date: 1947
- Former call signs: WPAL (1947–1999); WBUB (1999–1999); WGSE (1999–1999); WSCC (1999–2004)
- Call sign meaning: Warehoused calls formerly used by WRNW, a Milwaukee Clear Channel station, from 1985–2004 for its then-soft AC format

Technical information
- Licensing authority: FCC
- Facility ID: 73874
- Class: D
- Power: 1,100 watts (day); 103 watts (night)
- Transmitter coordinates: 32°46′24.00″N 80°0′56.00″W
- Translator: 106.7 W294CJ (Charleston)

Links
- Public license information: Public file; LMS
- Website: catholicradioinsc.com

WLTQ (730 AM) is a noncommercial radio station licensed to Charleston, South Carolina, United States. It is owned by Mediatrix SC and it airs a Catholic radio format. Most of the programming comes from EWTN Radio and is shared with co-owned WCKI in Greer.

WLTQ's transmitter is sited in the West Ashley neighborhood of Charleston, off Wappoo Road. Programming is simulcast on low-power FM translator W294CJ at 106.7 MHz in Charleston.

== History ==
=== WPAL ===
The station signed on the air in 1947. It was a 1,000-watt daytimer. The original call sign was WPAL, for both its owner, Palmetto Broadcasting, and for South Carolina's nickname of the "Palmetto State."

It later became Charleston's first radio station targeting African-Americans. It aired R&B music on weekdays, with urban gospel on Sundays. William Saunders bought the station in 1985 after being a part owner since 1971, and he added 100.9 WPAL-FM in 1994. In 1998, he sold WPAL-AM-FM to Clear Channel Communications, based in San Antonio.

=== WSC Talk ===
Clear Channel changed the AM station's call sign to WSCC (though the station was known as WSC). Its format flipped to talk radio in 1999 and it carried many of the nationally syndicated talk shows from co-owned Premiere Networks. The station moved from 18th to 16th place. By 2002, WSC was beating rival talk station 1250 WTMA with 25-54 listeners in the early afternoon, thanks to carrying The Rush Limbaugh Show. WSC had taken the program from WTMA, since it was syndicated by Premiere Networks. But WTMA was the clear winner in other time slots.

In 2004, the call letters changed to WLTQ after another Clear Channel station in Milwaukee changed its format from soft AC (with the "LT" standing for "light"), to an adult hits format as WQBW (that station is currently known as WRNW), with Clear Channel placing them on 730 AM in Charleston to prevent a competitor from re-using them. The station began airing liberal-leaning progressive talk shows from Air America Radio. Programs included Morning Sedition and The Majority Report. It also carried The Stephanie Miller Show and The Ed Schultz Show from the Jones Radio Network. AM 730 used the branding "Progressive 730".

=== Adult Standards, Latin Pop and Catholic Talk ===
In 2005, WLTQ flipped to adult standards music. It began carrying the nationally syndicated "Music of Your Life" feed. That lasted 3 years. In March 2008, the station switched to Spanish-language music as "Viva 730".

According to FCC filings, the station was sold to Indigo Radio LLC in July 2008. The new owners took the station silent because they did not have access to the prior station's studio or broadcast facilities. They received an FCC construction permit to move to a new location. As of December 2008, the new owners applied for an additional 90 days to remain silent while they constructed their new facilities.

In July 2009, WLTQ returned to the air with urban gospel music. Then in 2010, Indigo announced the sale of WLTQ to Mediatrix SC LLC, owner of nearby WQIZ. The price tag was $525,000. In 2011, WLTQ changed to a format of Catholic talk, mostly from EWTN Radio.
